= Grimaldi Ministry =

Spanish government (1763–1777)

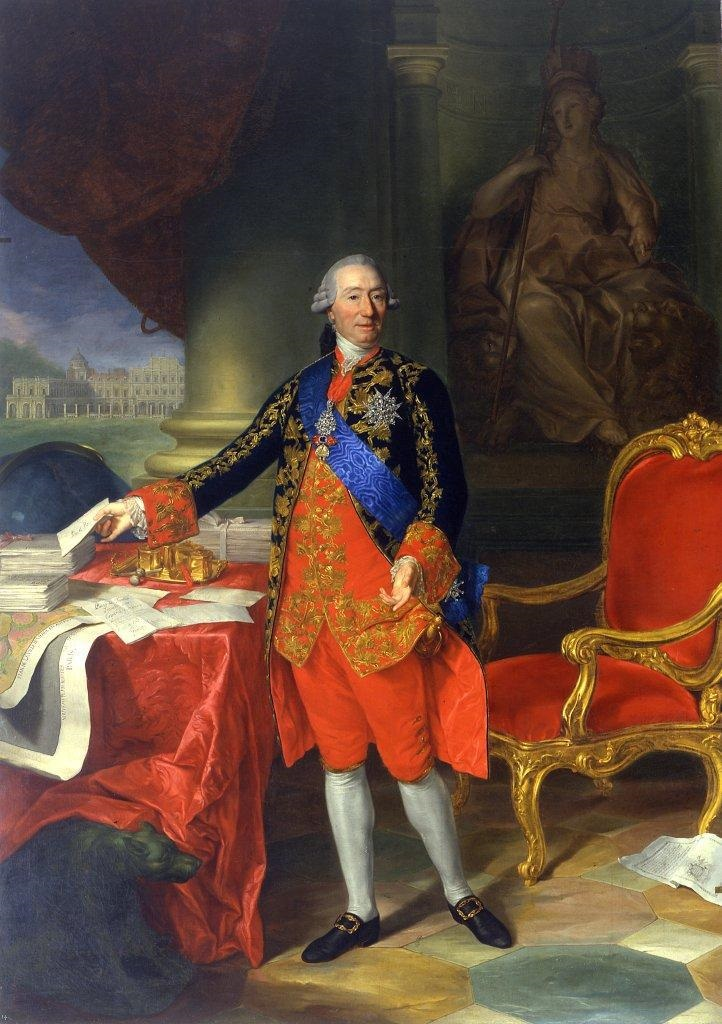
Jerónimo Grimaldi

The Grimaldi Ministry was a Spanish government headed by Jerónimo Grimaldi which lasted between 9 October 1763 and 19 February 1777. Following Spain's disastrous performance in the Seven Years' War, Grimaldi was tasked with pushing through reforms of the navy, army, public finances and colonial administration system which he did with some success. His government was packed with reforms known as Grillos, many of whom wanted to remodel the Spanish state to closer resemble that of Britain.

In 1777 he was dismissed by Charles III and made Spanish Ambassador to Rome. He was replaced by the Floridablanca Ministry which served from 1777 to 1792.

== Cabinet ==
9 October 1763 – 19 February 1777
Portfolio	Image	Holder	Term
First Secretary of State (PM)		Jerónimo Grimaldi	9 October 1763 – 19 February 1777
Secretary of State for the Treasury		Miguel de Múzquiz y Goyeneche	1 April 1766 – 19 February 1777
Secretary of State for the Treasury			9 October 1763 – 1 April 1766
Secretary of State for War		Marquess of Esquilache	9 October 1763 – 1 April 1766
Secretary of State for War		Juan Gregorio Muniain	1 April 1766 – 14 January 1772
Secretary of State for War		Ambrosio de Funes Villalpando	14 January 1772 – 19 February 1777
Secretary of State for Grace and Justice		Alonso Muñiz y Caso Osorio	9 October 1763 – 16 January 1765
Secretary of State for Grace and Justice		Manuel de Roda y Arrieta	16 January 1765 – 19 February 1777
Secretary of the State for Navy		Pedro González de Castejón	28 January 1776 – 19 February 1777
Secretary of the State for Navy			9 October 1763 – 28 January 1776
Secretary of State for Indies		Julián de Arriaga y Ribera	9 October 1763 – 28 January 1776
Secretary of State for Indies		Marquess of Sonora	28 January 1776 – 19 February 1777

== Bibliography ==
- Simms, Brendan. Three Victories and a Defeat: The Rise and Fall of the First British Empire. Penguin Books 2008.
