= Ministry of War (Spain) =

Former department official in Spain

- Spanish: Ministerio de la Guerra
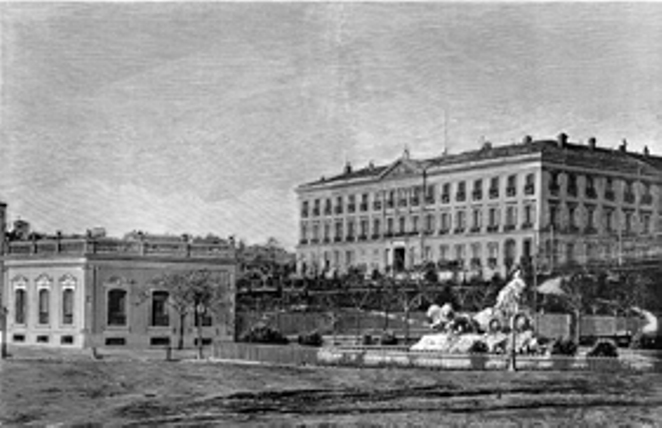
- Palace of Buenavista, formerly the site of the war ministry

Agency overview
- Formed: 25 November 1807; 218 years ago
- Dissolved: 17 May 1937; 89 years ago
- Superseding agency: Ministry of National Defense
- Ministers responsible: Antonio de Olaguer y Feliú, first Minister; Francisco Largo Caballero, last Minister

The Spanish Ministry of War (Spanish: Ministerio de la Guerra) was established as the Secretary of State (Spanish: Secretario del Despacho de Guerra) in 1714. In 1977 it was collected with the Ministry of the Navy and Ministry of the Air to create the Minister of Defence.

== List of officeholders ==
=== Kingdom of Spain (1700–1810) ===
No.	Portrait	Name (born–died)	Term of office			Government	Ref.
No.	Portrait	Name (born–died)	Took office	Left office	Time in office	Government	Ref.
Royal Secretary of State for War Universal Bureau
First reign of Philip V (1700–1724)
1		Manuel Coloma y Escolano (1637–1713)	15 September 1703	4 August 1704	324 days	Ubilla	
Royal Secretary of State for War and Treasury
1		José de Grimaldo (1660–1743)	11 July 1705	30 November 1714	9 years, 182 days	Mejorada; Velasco	
Minister of War (Note: Depending on the Royal Secretary of State for War and Treasury)
1		Fernando de Moncada y Gaetano (1646–1712)	January 1707	October 1709	2 years	Mejorada	
2		Isidoro de la Cueva y Benavides (1652–1723)	October 1709	January 1713	3 years	Mejorada	
Royal Secretary of State for War
1		Miguel Fernández Durán (1681–1721)	30 November 1714	21 January 1721	6 years, 52 days	Grimaldo I	
2		Baltasar Patiño y Rosales (1667–1733)	21 January 1721	15 January 1724	2 years, 359 days	Grimaldo I	
Reign of Louis I (1724)
(2)		Baltasar Patiño y Rosales (1667–1733)	15 January 1724	31 August 1724	229 days	Orendain I	
Second reign of Philip V (1724–1746)
(2)		Baltasar Patiño y Rosales (1667–1733)	31 August 1724	12 December 1725	1 year, 103 days	Orendain I	
(2)		Baltasar Patiño y Rosales (1667–1733)	31 August 1724	12 December 1725	1 year, 103 days	Grimaldo II	
3		Baron Ripperda (1684–1737)	12 December 1725	14 April 1726	123 days	Ripperda	
(2)		Baltasar Patiño y Rosales (1667–1733)	14 April 1726	5 September 1730	4 years, 144 days	Grimaldo III; Orendáin II	
4		José Patiño y Rosales (1666–1736)	5 September 1730	3 November 1736 †	6 years, 59 days	Orendáin II; Patiño	
–		Marquess of Villarías (1687–1766); Interim	3 November 1736	18 March 1737	135 days	Villarías	
5		Duke of Montemar (1671–1747)	18 March 1737	27 October 1741	4 years, 223 days	Villarías	
6		Marquess of Villarías (1687–1766)	27 October 1741	11 April 1743	1 year, 166 days	Villarías	
7		Marquess of Ensenada (1702–1781)	11 April 1743	9 July 1746	3 years, 59 days	Villarías	
Reign of Ferdinand VI (1746–1759)
(7)		Marquess of Ensenada (1702–1781)	9 July 1746	22 July 1754	8 years, 13 days	Villarías; Carvajal; Huéscar; Wall	
8		Sebastián de Eslava (1685–1759)	22 July 1754	21 June 1759 †	4 years, 333 days	Wall	
9		Ricardo Wall (1694–1777)	21 June 1759	10 August 1759	81 days	Wall	
Reign of Charles III (1759–1788)
(9)		Ricardo Wall (1694–1777)	10 August 1759	1 September 1763	4 years, 22 days	Wall	
10		Marquess of Esquilache (1699–1785)	1 September 1763	1 April 1766	2 years, 212 days	Wall; Grimaldi	
11		Juan Gregorio Muniáin (1699–1772)	1 April 1766	14 January 1772 †	5 years, 288 days	Grimaldi	
12		Ambrosio de Funes y Villalpando (1720–1782)	14 January 1772	15 July 1780	8 years, 183 days	Grimaldi; Floridablanca	
13		Miguel de Múzquiz y Goyeneche (1719–1785)	15 July 1780	21 January 1785 †	4 years, 190 days	Floridablanca	
14		Pedro López de Lerena (1734–1792)	21 January 1785	29 June 1787	2 years, 159 days	Floridablanca	
15		Jerónimo de Caballero y Vicente del Campo (1721–1807)	29 June 1787	14 December 1788	1 year, 168 days	Floridablanca; Supreme Council of State	
Reign of Charles IV (1788–1808)
(15)		Jerónimo de Caballero y Vicente del Campo (1721–1807)	14 December 1788	27 April 1790	1 year, 134 days	Supreme Council of State	
16		Manuel Negrete de la Torre (1736–1818)	27 April 1790	11 December 1795	5 years, 228 days	Supreme Council of State; Aranda; Godoy	
17		Miguel José de Azanza (1746–1826)	11 December 1795	7 October 1796	301 days	Godoy	
Office abolished (held by the First Secretary of State)
18		Antonio de Olaguer y Feliú (1742–1813)	25 November 1807	19 March 1808	115 days	Guerra I O'Farril	
Reign of Ferdinand VII (1808)
(18)		Antonio de Olaguer y Feliú (1742–1813)	19 March 1808	5 April 1808	17 days	Guerra II	
19		Gonzalo O'Farrill (1754–1831)	5 April 1808	7 July 1808	93 days	Guerra II	

=== Spain under Joseph Bonaparte (1808–1813) ===
No.	Portrait	Name (born–died)	Term of office			Ref.
No.	Portrait	Name (born–died)	Took office	Left office	Time in office	Ref.
Minister of War
Reign of Joseph I (1808–1813)
1		Gonzalo O'Farrill (1754–1831)	7 July 1808	27 June 1813	4 years, 355 days	

=== Junta Suprema Central (1808–1812) ===
No.	Portrait	Name (born–died)	Term of office			Ref.
No.	Portrait	Name (born–died)	Took office	Left office	Time in office	Ref.
Royal Secretary of War
1		Antonio Cornel Ferraz Doz y Ferraz (1745–1821)	15 October 1808	31 January 1810	1 year, 108 days	
2		Francisco de Eguía (1750–1827)	31 January 1810	20 May 1810	109 days	
–		Eusebio Bardají y Azara (1776–1842) acting	20 May 1810	9 October 1810	109 days	
3		José Heredia (1751–1814)	9 October 1810	6 February 1812	1 year, 120 days	
–		José María Carvajal Urrutia (1762–1832) acting	6 February 1812	23 June 1812	138 days	
4		Francisco Javier Abadía (1774–1830)	23 June 1812	30 May 1813	341 days	
–		Juan O'Donojú (1762–1821) acting	30 May 1813	14 January 1814	229 days	
–		Tomás Moreno Daoíz (1765–1829) acting	14 January 1814	4 May 1814	110 days	

=== Kingdom of Spain (1810–1873) ===
No.	Portrait	Name (born–died)	Term of office			Ref.
No.	Portrait	Name (born–died)	Took office	Left office	Time in office	Ref.
Royal Secretary of War
Reign of Ferdinand VII (1814–1833)
1		Manuel Alberto Freire de Andrade y Armijo (1767–1835)	4 May 1814	29 May 1814	25 days	
2		Francisco de Eguía (1750–1827)	29 May 1814	25 March 1815	300 days	
3		Francisco López Ballesteros (1770–1833)	25 March 1815	23 October 1815	212 days	
–		Francisco Bernaldo de Quirós y Mariño de Lobera (1763–1837) acting	23 October 1815	19 June 1817	1 year, 239 days	
(2)		Francisco de Eguía (1750–1827)	19 June 1817	13 June 1819	1 year, 359 days	
–		José María de Alós y de Mora (1765–1844) acting	13 June 1819	18 March 1820	279 days	
Minister of War
1		Pedro Agustín Girón (1778–1842)	18 March 1820	18 August 1820	153 days	
2		Juan Jabat Aztal (1772–1825)	18 August 1820	23 September 1820	36 days	
3		Cayetano Valdés y Flores (1767–1835)	23 September 1820	4 March 1821	162 days	
4		Tomás Moreno Daoíz (1765–1829)	4 March 1821	23 August 1821	172 days	
5		Diego Contador (1754–1833)	23 August 1821	4 September 1821	12 days	
6		Ignacio Balanzat de Orvay y Briones (1773–1837)	4 September 1821	9 September 1821	5 days	
7		Estanislao Sánchez Salvador (1774–1823)	9 September 1821	8 January 1822	121 days	
–		José Castellar (1778–1836) acting	9 January 1822	24 January 1822	16 days	
8		José Cienfuegos Jovellanos (1763–1825)	24 January 1822	28 February 1822	51 days	
9		Luis María Balanzat de Orvay y Briones (1775–1843)	28 February 1822	6 July 1822	128 days	
10		Miguel López de Baños (1779–1861)	10 July 1822	29 April 1823	293 days	
–		Pedro de la Bárcena (1768–1836) acting	29 April 1823	2 June 1823	293 days	
–		Estanislao Sánchez Salvador (1774–1823) acting	2 June 1823	18 June 1823	16 days	
11		Manuel de la Puente (1784–1857)	21 June 1823	30 September 1823	101 days	
12		José San Juan (1777–1846)	30 September 1823	2 December 1823	63 days	
Royal Secretary of War
1		José de la Cruz (1777–1846)	2 December 1823	26 August 1824	268 days	
–		José Aymerich (1775–1841) acting	26 August 1824	13 June 1825	291 days	
–		Luis María Salazar y Salazar (1758–1838) acting	13 June 1825	27 June 1825	14 days	
2		Miguel Ibarrola González (1776–1848)	27 June 1825	1 October 1832	7 years, 96 days	
3		Juan Antonio Monet (1782–1837)	1 October 1832	14 December 1832	74 days	
(1)		José de la Cruz (1777–1846)	14 December 1832	29 November 1833	350 days	
Minister of War
Reign of Maria Christina of the Two Sicilies (1833–1840)
1		Antonio Remón Zarco del Valle y Huet (1785–1866)	29 November 1833	2 November 1834	338 days	
2		Manuel Llauder (1789–1851)	2 November 1834	17 February 1835	107 days	
3		Jerónimo Valdés (1784–1855)	17 February 1835	13 June 1835	116 days	
4		Pedro Agustín Girón (1778–1842)	13 June 1835	28 August 1835	76 days	
–		Prudencio de Guadalfajara (1761–1855) acting	18 August 1835	14 September 1835	27 days	
–		Mariano Quirós (1791–1859) acting	14 September 1835	27 September 1835	13 days	
5		Ildefonso Díez de Rivera (1877–1846)	27 September 1835	27 April 1836	213 days	
6		José Ramón Rodil (1789–1853)	27 April 1836	15 May 1836	18 days	
7		Antonio Seoane (1790–1862)	15 May 1836	8 June 1836	24 days	
8		Santiago Méndez Vigo (1790–1860)	8 June 1836	14 August 1836	67 days	
(6)		José Ramón Rodil (1789–1853)	20 August 1836	26 November 1836	98 days	
–		Javier Rodríguez Vera (–) acting	26 November 1836	27 February 1837	93 days	
(5)		Ildefonso Díez de Rivera (1877–1846)	27 February 1837	29 July 1837	152 days	
9		Baldomero Espartero (1793–1879)	29 July 1837	30 August 1837	32 days	
10		Evaristo Fernández de San Miguel (1785–1862)	30 August 1837	1 October 1837	32 days	
11		Ignacio Balanzat de Orvay y Briones (1773–1837)	1 October 1837	4 October 1837	3 days	
12		Francisco Ramonet (1774–1844)	4 October 1837	8 December 1837	65 days	
–		Jacobo María Espinosa (1793–1853) acting	8 December 1837	16 December 1837	8 days	
(9)		Baldomero Espartero (1793–1879)	16 December 1837	17 January 1838	32 days	
13		José Carratalá (1792–1855)	17 January 1838	19 March 1838	61 days	
14		Manuel Latre (1789–1840)	19 March 1838	16 September 1838	181 days	
15		Isidro de Alaix Fábregas (1790–1853)	16 September 1838	30 October 1839	1 year, 44 days	
–		Francisco Narváez Bordese (1793–1865)	30 October 1839	16 November 1839	39 days	
16		Francisco Narváez Bordese (1793–1865)	16 November 1839	8 April 1840	144 days	
–		Fernando de Norzagaray (1808–1860) acting	8 April 1840	14 April 1840	6 days	
17		Serafín María de Sotto (1793–1862)	14 April 1840	19 July 1840	96 days	
18		Valentín Ferraz y Barrau (1792–1866)	20 July 1840	28 August 1840	39 days	
19		Francisco Javier Azpiroz (1797–1868)	28 August 1840	11 September 1840	14 days	
20		Facundo Infante (1786–1873)	11 September 1840	16 September 1840	5 days	
Regency of Baldomero Espartero (1840–1843)
21		Pedro Chacón y Chacón (1789–1854)	16 September 1840	20 May 1841	246 days	
22		Evaristo Fernández de San Miguel (1785–1862)	20 May 1841	17 June 1842	1 year, 28 days	
23		José Ramón Rodil (1789–1853)	17 June 1842	9 May 1843	326 days	
24		Francisco Serrano (1810–1885)	9 May 1843	19 May 1843	10 days	
25		Isidoro Rubín de Celis (1793–1876)	19 May 1843	24 May 1843	5 days	
–		Agustín Nogueras (1786–1857) acting	24 May 1843	30 July 1843	67 days	
Reign of Isabella II (1843–1868)
(24)		Francisco Serrano (1810–1885)	30 July 1843	1 December 1843	124 days	
26		Manuel Mazarredo (1807–1857)	5 December 1843	3 May 1844	150 days	
27		Ramón María Narváez (1800–1868)	3 May 1844	12 February 1846	1 year, 285 days	
28		Federico Roncali (1800–1857)	12 February 1846	16 March 1846	32 days	
(27)		Ramón María Narváez (1800–1868)	16 March 1846	5 April 1846	20 days	
–		Francisco Armero (1804–1866) acting	5 April 1846	12 April 1846	7 days	
29		José Laureano Sanz (1793–1868)	12 April 1846	28 January 1847	291 days	
30		Manuel Pavía y Lacy (1793–1868)	28 January 1847	15 February 1847	18 days	
31		Marcelino de Oraá Lecumberri (1788–1851)	15 February 1847	28 March 1847	41 days	
(26)		Manuel Mazarredo (1807–1857)	28 March 1847	31 August 1847	156 days	
32		Fernando Fernández de Cordova (1807–1857)	31 August 1847	3 November 1847	64 days	
(27)		Ramón María Narváez (1800–1868)	3 November 1847	24 December 1847	51 days	
33		Francisco de Paula Figueras (1786–1858)	24 December 1847	19 October 1849	1 year, 299 days	
34		Serafín María de Sotto (1793–1862)	19 October 1849	20 October 1849	1 day	
(33)		Francisco de Paula Figueras (1786–1858)	20 October 1849	14 January 1851	1 year, 86 days	
35		Rafael Arístegui y Vélez (1794–1863)	14 January 1851	6 February 1851	23 days	
36		Francisco Lersundi Hormaechea (1817–1874)	6 February 1851	16 January 1852	344 days	
37		Joaquín Ezpeleta Enrile (1788–1863)	16 January 1852	13 June 1852	149 days	
38		Juan de Lara (1809–1869)	13 June 1852	27 November 1852	167 days	
39		Cayetano Urbina y Daoiz (1797–1867)	27 November 1852	14 December 1852	17 days	
(38)		Juan de Lara (1809–1869)	14 December 1852	14 April 1853	121 days	
(36)		Francisco Lersundi Hormaechea (1817–1874)	14 April 1853	19 September 1853	158 days	
40		Anselmo Blaser (1807–1872)	19 September 1853	18 July 1854	302 days	
(32)		Fernando Fernández de Cordova (1807–1857)	18 July 1854	30 July 1854	12 days	
41		Leopoldo O'Donnell (1809–1867)	30 July 1854	12 October 1856	2 years, 74 days	
42		Juan Antonio de Urbiztondo (1803–1857)	12 October 1856	16 December 1856	65 days	
(33)		Francisco de Paula Figueras (1786–1858)	16 December 1856	15 October 1857	303 days	
43		Francisco Armero (1804–1866)	15 October 1857	14 January 1858	91 days	
43		Fermín de Ezpeleta (1801–1869)	14 January 1858	30 June 1858	167 days	
(41)		Leopoldo O'Donnell (Note: José MacCrohon y Blake was interim since 7 November 1859 until 30 April 1860) (1809–1867)	30 June 1858	2 March 1863	4 years, 217 days	
44		José Gutiérrez de la Concha (1809–1895)	2 March 1863	17 January 1864	349 days	
(36)		Francisco Lersundi Hormaechea (1817–1874)	17 January 1864	1 March 1864	44 days	
45		José María Marchessi y Oleaga (1801–1882)	1 March 1864	16 September 1864	199 days	
(32)		Fernando Fernández de Cordova (1807–1857)	16 September 1864	30 March 1865	226 days	
46		Felipe Rivero y Lemoine (1797–1873)	30 March 1865	21 June 1865	83 days	
(41)		Leopoldo O'Donnell (1809–1867)	21 June 1865	10 July 1866	1 year, 19 days	
(27)		Ramón María Narváez (1800–1868)	10 July 1866	23 April 1868 †	1 year, 288 days	
47		Rafael Mayalde (1805–1870)	23 April 1868	19 September 1868	149 days	
(44)		José Gutiérrez de la Concha (1809–1895)	19 September 1868	30 September 1868	11 days	
Provisional Government (1868–1871) (Sexenio Democrático)
48		Juan Prim (1814–1870)	8 October 1868	27 December 1870	2 years, 80 days	
–		Juan Bautista Topete (1821–1885) acting	27 December 1870	4 January 1871	8 days	
Reign of Amadeo I (1871–1873)
–		Francisco Serrano (1810–1885) acting	4 January 1871	24 July 1871	201 days	
–		Fernando Fernández de Córdova (1809–1883) acting	24 July 1871	5 October 1871	73 days	
49		Joaquín Bassols (1797–1872)	5 October 1871	21 December 1871	77 days	
50		Eugenio Gaminde (1812–1878)	21 December 1871	20 February 1872	61 days	
51		Antonio del Rey y Caballero (1814–1886)	20 February 1872	8 April 1872	48 days	
52		Juan de Zavala (1804–1879)	8 April 1872	26 May 1872	48 days	
(24)		Francisco Serrano (1810–1885)	26 May 1872	13 June 1872	18 days	
(32)		Fernando Fernández de Córdova (1809–1883)	13 June 1872	12 February 1873	244 days	

=== First Spanish Republic (1873–1874) ===
No.	Portrait	Name	Term of office			Government	Ref.
No.	Portrait	Name	Took office	Left office	Time in office	Government	Ref.
Minister of War
1		Fernando Fernández de Córdova (1809–1883)	12 February 1873	24 February 1873	12 days	Figueras I	
2		Juan Acosta Muñoz (1819–1887)	24 February 1873	30 April 1873	65 days	Figueras II	
3		Ramon Nouvilas (1812–1880)	30 April 1873	7 June 1873	38 days	Figueras II	
–		Estanislao Figueras (1819–1882) acting	7 June 1873	11 June 1873	4 days	Figueras II	
4		Nicolás Estévanez (1838–1914)	11 June 1873	28 June 1873	17 days	Pi y Margall	
5		Eulogio González Íscar (1818–1897)	28 June 1873	4 September 1873	68 days	Pi y Margall; Salmerón y Alonso	
–		Jacobo Oreyro y Villavicencio (1822–1881) acting	7 September 1873	9 September 1873	2 days	Castelar	
6		José Sánchez Bregua (1818–1897)	9 September 1873	3 January 1874	116 days	Castelar	
7		Juan de Zavala (1804–1879)	3 January 1874	29 June 1874	177 days	Serrano	
–		Fernando Cotoner y Chacón (1817–1888) acting	29 June 1874	3 September 1874	66 days	Serrano	
8		Francisco Serrano Bedoya (1812–1882)	3 September 1874	31 December 1874	119 days	Sagasta III	

=== Kingdom of Spain (1874–1931) ===
No.	Portrait	Name	Term of office			Government	Ref.
No.	Portrait	Name	Took office	Left office	Time in office	Government	Ref.
Minister of War
Reign of Alfonso XII (1874–1885)
1		Joaquín Jovellar y Soler (Note: Fernando Primo de Rivera as interim since 31 December 1874 until 1 January 1875, until his arrival) (1819–1892)	31 December 1874	2 December 1875	336 days	Cánovas del Castillo I Jovellar y Soler	
2		Francisco de Ceballos y Vargas (1814–1883)	2 December 1875	7 March 1879	3 years, 95 days	Cánovas del Castillo II	
3		Arsenio Martínez Campos (1831–1900)	7 March 1879	9 December 1879	277 days	Martínez Campos	
4		José Ignacio de Echavarría (1817–1898)	9 December 1879	8 February 1881	1 year, 61 days	Cánovas del Castillo III	
(3)		Arsenio Martínez Campos (1831–1900)	8 February 1881	13 October 1883	2 years, 247 days	Sagasta IV	
5		José López Domínguez (1829–1911)	13 October 1883	18 January 1884	97 days	Posada Herrera	
6		Jenaro Quesada (1818–1889)	18 January 1884	27 November 1885	1 year, 313 days	Cánovas del Castillo IV	
Regency of Maria Christina of Austria (1885–1902)
(1)		Joaquín Jovellar y Soler (1819–1892)	27 November 1885	10 October 1886	317 days	Sagasta V	
7		Ignacio María del Castillo (1817–1893)	10 October 1886	8 March 1887	149 days	Sagasta V	
8		Manuel Cassola (1838–1890)	8 March 1887	14 June 1888	1 year, 98 days	Sagasta V	
9		Thomás O'Ryan y Vázquez (1821–1902)	14 June 1888	11 December 1888	180 days	Sagasta VI	
10		José Chinchilla (1839–1899)	11 December 1888	21 January 1890	1 year, 41 days	Sagasta VII	
11		Eduardo Bermúdez Reina (1831–1899)	21 January 1890	5 July 1890	165 days	Sagasta VIII	
12		Marcelo Azcárraga Palmero (1832–1915)	5 July 1890	11 December 1892	2 years, 159 days	Cánovas del Castillo VI–VII	
(5)		José López Domínguez (1829–1911)	11 December 1892	23 March 1895	2 years, 102 days	Sagasta IX–X–XI	
(12)		Marcelo Azcárraga Palmero (1832–1915)	23 March 1895	4 October 1897	2 years, 195 days	Cánovas del Castillo VIII; Azcárraga Palmero I	
13		Miguel Correa y García (1832–1900)	4 October 1897	4 March 1899	1 year, 151 days	Sagasta XII–XIII	
14		Camilo García de Polavieja (1838–1914)	4 March 1899	2 October 1899	212 days	Silvela I	
(12)		Marcelo Azcárraga Palmero (1832–1915)	2 October 1899	18 October 1900	1 year, 16 days	Silvela I–II	
15		Arsenio Linares y Pombo (1848–1914)	18 October 1900	6 March 1901	139 days	Azcárraga Palmero II	
16		Valeriano Weyler (1838–1930)	6 March 1901	17 May 1902	1 year, 72 days	Sagasta XIV–XV	
Reign of Alfonso XIII (1902–1931)
(16)		Valeriano Weyler (1838–1930)	17 May 1902	6 December 1902	203 days	Sagasta XVI–XVII	
(15)		Arsenio Linares y Pombo (1848–1914)	6 December 1902	20 July 1903	226 days	Silvela III	
17		Vicente Martitegui (1843–1912)	20 July 1903	5 December 1903	138 days	Villaverde I	
(15)		Arsenio Linares y Pombo (1848–1914)	5 December 1903	16 December 1904	1 year, 11 days	Maura I	
18		César del Villar y Villate (1843–1917)	16 December 1904	27 January 1905	42 days	Azcárraga Palmero III	
(17)		Vicente Martitegui (1843–1912)	27 January 1905	23 June 1905	147 days	Villaverde II	
(16)		Valeriano Weyler (1838–1930)	23 June 1905	1 December 1905	161 days	Montero Ríos I–II	
19		Agustín de Luque y Coca (1850–1937)	1 December 1905	6 July 1906	217 days	Moret I	
(5)		José López Domínguez (1829–1911)	6 July 1906	15 October 1906	131 days	Domínguez	
(19)		Agustín de Luque y Coca (1850–1937)	15 October 1906	4 December 1906	50 days	Domínguez; Moret II	
(16)		Valeriano Weyler (1838–1930)	4 December 1906	25 January 1907	52 days	Aguilar	
20		Francisco de Paula Loño y Pérez (1837–1907)	25 January 1907	30 June 1907 †	156 days	Maura II	
–		Nicasio Montes Sierra (1844–1914) acting	30 June 1907	3 July 1907	3 days	Maura II	
21		Fernando Primo de Rivera (1831–1921)	3 July 1907	1 March 1909	1 year, 241 days	Maura II	
(15)		Arsenio Linares y Pombo (1848–1914)	1 March 1909	21 October 1909	234 days	Maura II	
(19)		Agustín de Luque y Coca (1850–1937)	21 October 1909	9 February 1910	111 days	Moret III	
22		Ángel Aznar y Butigieg (1847–1924)	9 February 1910	3 April 1911	1 year, 53 days	Canalejas I–II	
(19)		Agustín de Luque y Coca (1850–1937)	3 April 1911	27 October 1913	2 years, 207 days	Canalejas III de Figueroa I–II	
23		Ramón Echagüe y Méndez Vigo (1852–1917)	27 October 1913	9 December 1915	2 years, 43 days	Dato I	
(19)		Agustín de Luque y Coca (1850–1937)	9 December 1915	19 April 1917	1 year, 131 days	de Figueroa III	
24		Francisco Aguilera y Egea (1857–1931)	19 April 1917	11 June 1917	53 days	Prieto I	
(21)		Fernando Primo de Rivera (1831–1921)	11 June 1917	18 October 1917	129 days	Dato II	
25		José Marina Vega (1850–1926)	18 October 1917	3 November 1917	16 days	Dato II	
26		Juan de la Cierva y Peñafiel (1850–1926)	3 November 1917	22 March 1918	139 days	Prieto II	
(25)		José Marina Vega (1850–1926)	22 March 1918	9 November 1918	232 days	Maura III	
27		Dámaso Berenguer (1873–1953)	9 November 1918	27 January 1919	79 days	Prieto III de Figueroa IV	
28		Diego Muñoz Cobos (1854–1937)	27 January 1919	15 April 1919	78 days	de Figueroa IV	
29		Luis de Santiago y Aguirrevengoa (1854–1930)	15 April 1919	20 July 1919	5 days	Maura IV	
30		Antonio Tovar y Marcoleta (1847–1925)	20 July 1919	12 December 1919	236 days	de Toca	
–		Manuel Allendesalazar y Muñoz (1856–1923) acting	12 December 1919	15 December 1919	3 days	Muñoz I	
31		José Villalba Riquelme (1856–1944)	15 December 1919	5 May 1920	142 days	Muñoz I	
32		Luis de Marichalar y Monreal (1873–1945)	5 May 1920	14 August 1921	1 year, 101 days	Dato III; Muñoz II	
(26)		Juan de la Cierva y Peñafiel (1850–1926)	14 August 1921	8 March 1922	206 days	Maura V	
33		José Olaguer Feliú (1857–1929)	8 March 1922	15 July 1922	129 days	Sánchez-Guerra y Martínez	
–		José Sánchez-Guerra y Martínez (1859–1935) acting	15 July 1922	7 December 1922	145 days	Sánchez-Guerra y Martínez	
34		Niceto Alcalá-Zamora (1877–1949)	7 December 1922	26 May 1923	170 days	Prieto IV	
35		Luis Aizpuru y Mondéjar (1857–1939)	26 May 1923	15 September 1923	112 days	Prieto IV	
Dictatorship of Primo de Rivera (1923–1931)
36		Luis Bermúdez de Castro (1864–1957)	15 September 1923	4 July 1924	324 days	Military Directory	
37		Juan O'Donnell (1864–1928)	4 July 1924	12 October 1928 †	4 years, 100 days	Military Directory; Civil Directory	
–		Severiano Martínez Anido (1862–1938) acting	12 October 1928	3 November 1928	22 days	Civil Directory	
Minister of the Army
1		Julio Ardanaz (1860–1939)	3 November 1928	30 January 1930	1 year, 88 days	Civil Directory	
2		Dámaso Berenguer (1873–1953)	30 January 1930	14 April 1931	1 year, 74 days	Berenguer; Aznar-Cabañas	

=== Second Spanish Republic (1931–1939) ===
No.	Portrait	Name (born–died)	Term of office			Political party	Government	Ref.
No.	Portrait	Name (born–died)	Took office	Left office	Time in office	Political party	Government	Ref.
Minister of War
1		Manuel Azaña (1880–1940)	14 April 1931	12 September 1933	2 years, 151 days	Republican Left	Provisional government Azaña II–III	
2		Juan José Rocha García (1877–1938)	12 September 1933	8 October 1933	26 days	Radical Republican Party	Lerroux I	
3		Vicente Iranzo (1889–1961)	8 October 1933	16 December 1933	69 days	Independent	Barrio I	
4		Diego Martínez Barrio (1883–1962)	16 December 1933	23 January 1934	38 days	Radical Republican Party	Lerroux II	
5		Diego Hidalgo y Durán (1886–1961)	23 January 1934	16 November 1934	297 days	Radical Republican Party	Lerroux II–III; Samper; Lerroux IV	
6		Alejandro Lerroux (1864–1949)	16 November 1934	3 April 1935	138 days	Radical Republican Party	Lerroux IV	
7		Carlos Masquelet (1871–1948)	3 April 1935	6 May 1935	33 days	Military	Lerroux V	
8		José María Gil-Robles y Quiñones (1898–1980)	6 May 1935	14 December 1935	222 days	CEDA	Lerroux VI; Chapaprieta I–II	
9		Nicolás Molero (1870–1947)	14 December 1935	19 February 1936	67 days	Military	Portela I–II	
(7)		Carlos Masquelet (1871–1948)	19 February 1936	13 May 1936	84 days	Military	Azaña IV–V; Trelles	
10		Santiago Casares Quiroga (1884–1950)	13 May 1936	19 July 1936	67 days	Military	Quiroga	
11		José Miaja (1878–1958)	19 July 1936	19 July 1936	0 days	Military	Barrio II	
12		Luis Castello Pantoja (1881–1962)	19 July 1936	6 August 1936	18 days	Military	Giral	
13		Juan Hernández Saravia (1880–1962)	6 August 1936	4 September 1936	29 days	Military	Giral	
14		Francisco Largo Caballero (1869–1946)	4 September 1936	17 May 1937	255 days	PSOE	Caballero I–II	
