= Wall Ministry =

Spanish government

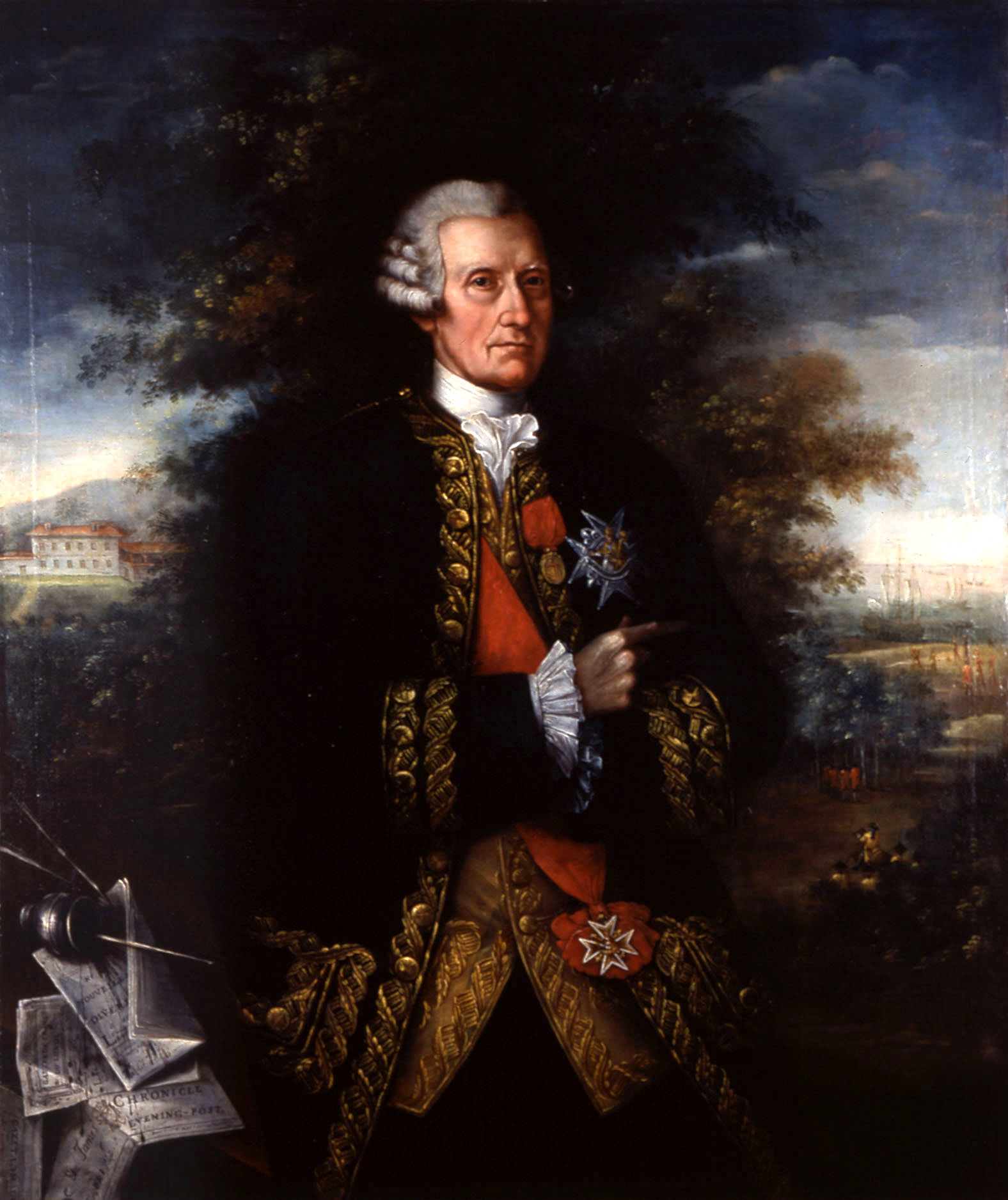
Ricardo Wall, the head of the ministry

The Wall Ministry was a Spanish government headed by Ricardo Wall which served between 15 May 1754 to 9 October 1763 during the reigns of Ferdinand VI and Charles III.

Wall came to power by thwarting the ambitions of his rival the Marquis of Ensenada. While Ensenada was pro-French and wanted to build an alliance with France to destroy British naval power, the Irish-descended Wall was supposed to be an Anglophile and his government steered Spain towards neutrality and friendly relations with Britain.

When the Seven Years' War broke out, Spain did not join with its traditional ally France but maintained a strict neutrality. However, when Charles III took the throne in 1759 he wanted to pursue a more pro-French policy, while retaining the popular and experienced Wall as Chief Minister. By the end of 1761 Spain was at war with Britain which had, as Wall had predicted, disastrous consequences for the Spanish who suffered a number of embarrassing military defeats to British forces (La Havana and Manila). He stepped down in 1763 following the Treaty of Paris, handing over power to Jerónimo Grimaldi.

== Cabinet ==
15 May 1754 – 9 October 1763
Portfolio	Image	Holder	Term
First Secretary of State (PM)		Ricardo Wall	15 May 1754 – 9 October 1763
Secretary of State for the Indies		Ricardo Wall	22 July – 20 August 1754
Secretary of State for War		Ricardo Wall	21 June 1759 – 1 September 1763
Secretary of State for War		Sebastián de Eslava	22 July 1754 – 21 June 1759
Secretary of State for War		Marquess of Esquilache	1 September – 9 October 1763
Secretary of State for the Treasury		Marquess of Esquilache	8 December 1759 – 9 October 1763
Secretary of State for the Treasury		Count of Valdeparaíso	22 July 1754 – 8 December 1759
Secretary of State for the Treasury		Marquess of Ensenada	15 May – 22 July 1754
Secretary of State for War		Marquess of Ensenada	15 May – 22 July 1754
Secretary of State for the Navy and the Indies		Marquess of Ensenada	15 May – 22 July 1754
Secretary of State for Grace and Justice		Alonso Muñiz y Caso Osorio	15 May 1754 – 9 October 1763
Secretary of State for the Navy		Julián de Arriaga y Ribera	22 July 1754 – 9 October 1763
Secretary of State for the Indies		Julián de Arriaga y Ribera	20 August 1754 – 9 October 1763

== Bibliography ==
- Browning, Reed. The Duke of Newcastle. Yale University Press, 1975.
- Hibbert, Christopher. George III: A Personal History. Penguin Books, 1999.
- Simms, Brendan. Three Victories and a Defeat: The Rise and Fall of the First British Empire. Penguin Books 2008.
- Téllez Alarcia, D., D. Ricardo Wall. Aut Caesar aut nullus, Madrid, 2008.
- Téllez Alarcia, D., Absolutismo e Ilustración en la España del s. XVIII. El Despotismo Ilustrado de D. Ricardo Wall, Madrid, 2010
- Téllez Alarcia, D., El ministerio Wall. La “España Discreta” del “Ministro Olvidado”, Madrid, 2012.
