= Floridablanca Ministry =

José Moñino, conde de Floridablanca

The Floridablanca Ministry was a Spanish government that served between 1777 and 1792 during the reigns of Charles III of Spain and Charles IV of Spain. It was headed by the Count of Floridablanca, a prominent reformer, who sought to press on with the program of reforms initiated by his predecessor Grimaldi.

One of the pillars of Floridablanca's beliefs was that friendly relations with Britain were crucial for the general improvement of Spain. It was considered ironic that in 1779 Spain, at the urging of the King, entered the American War of Independence on France's side, declaring war in Britain.

Despite his reluctance, Floriblanca took much of the credit for the war, as a Spanish force took advantage of the overstretched British Navy and took several of their colonies in the Caribbean and Gulf of Mexico. In the peace treaty that followed, Spain was awarded Minorca and Florida which had been lost to the British earlier in the century.

The war strengthened the governments position during the 1780s, and they pressed ahead with many reforms. A new threat to power began to emerge in the form of Manuel Godoy, a royal favourite and a Francophile, who grew increasingly influential. Following the outbreak of the French Revolution the reforming liberalism of Floridablanca and his followers rapidly fell out of fashion, and he was dismissed to make way for Godoy in 1792.

== Cabinet ==
=== Floridablanca's first government ===
19 February 1777 – 8 July 1787
Portfolio	Image	Holder	Term
First Secretary of State (PM)		The Count of Floridablanca	19 February 1777 – 28 February 1792
Secretary of State for Grace and Justice		The Count of Floridablanca	30 August 1782 – 8 July 1787 (acting)
Secretary of State for Indies		The Count of Floridablanca	17 June – 8 July 1787 (acting)
Secretary of State for Indies		Marquess de Sonora	19 February 1777 – 17 June 1787
Secretary of State for Grace and Justice		Manuel de Roda Arraiera	19 February 1777 – 30 August 1782
Secretary of State for War		Ambrosio de Funes Villalpando	19 February 1777 – 15 July 1780
Secretary of State for War		Miguel de Múzquiz y Goyeneche	15 July 1780 – 21 January 1785
Secretary of State for the Treasury		Miguel de Múzquiz y Goyeneche	19 February 1777 – 21 January 1785
Secretary of State for the Treasury		Pedro López de Lerena	21 January 1785 – 8 July 1787
Secretary of State for War		Pedro López de Lerena	21 January 1785 – 29 June 1787
Secretary of State for War		Jerónimo Caballero y Vicente del Campo	29 June – 8 July 1787
Secretary of State for the Navy		Pedro González de Castejón	19 February 1777 – 9 March 1783
Secretary of State for the Navy		Antonio Valdés y Fernández Bazán	9 March 1783 – 8 July 1787

=== Floridablanca's second government ===
Supreme Council of State 8 July 1787 – 28 February 1792
Portfolio	Image	Holder	Term
First Secretary of State (PM)		The Count of Floridablanca	19 February 1777 – 28 February 1792
Secretary of State for Grace and Justice		The Count of Floridablanca	8 July 1787 – 25 April 1790 (acting)
Secretary of State for Grace and Justice		Antonio Aniceto Porlier	25 April 1790 – 28 February 1792
Secretary of State for Grace and Justice of Indies		Antonio Aniceto Porlier	8 July 1787 – 25 April 1790
Secretary of State for the Treasury		Pedro López de Lerena	8 July 1787 – 16 October 1791
Secretary of State for the Treasury		Diego de Gardoqui	16 October 1791 – 28 February 1792
Secretary of State for War		Jerónimo Caballero y Vicente del Campo	8 July 1787 – 27 April 1790
Secretary of State for War		Manuel Negrete de la Torre	27 April 1790 – 28 February 1792
Secretary of State for the Navy		Antonio Valdés y Fernández Bazán	8 July 1787 – 28 February 1792
Secretary of State for War, Treasury, Commerce and Navigation of Indies		Antonio Valdés y Fernández Bazán	8 July 1787 – 25 April 1790

== Bibliography ==
- Hughes, Robert. Goya. Vintage, 2004.
- Simms, Brendan. Three Victories and a Defeat: The Rise and Fall of the First British Empire. Penguin Books 2008.
