= The Esquilache Immaculate Conception =

Painting by Bartolomé Esteban Murillo

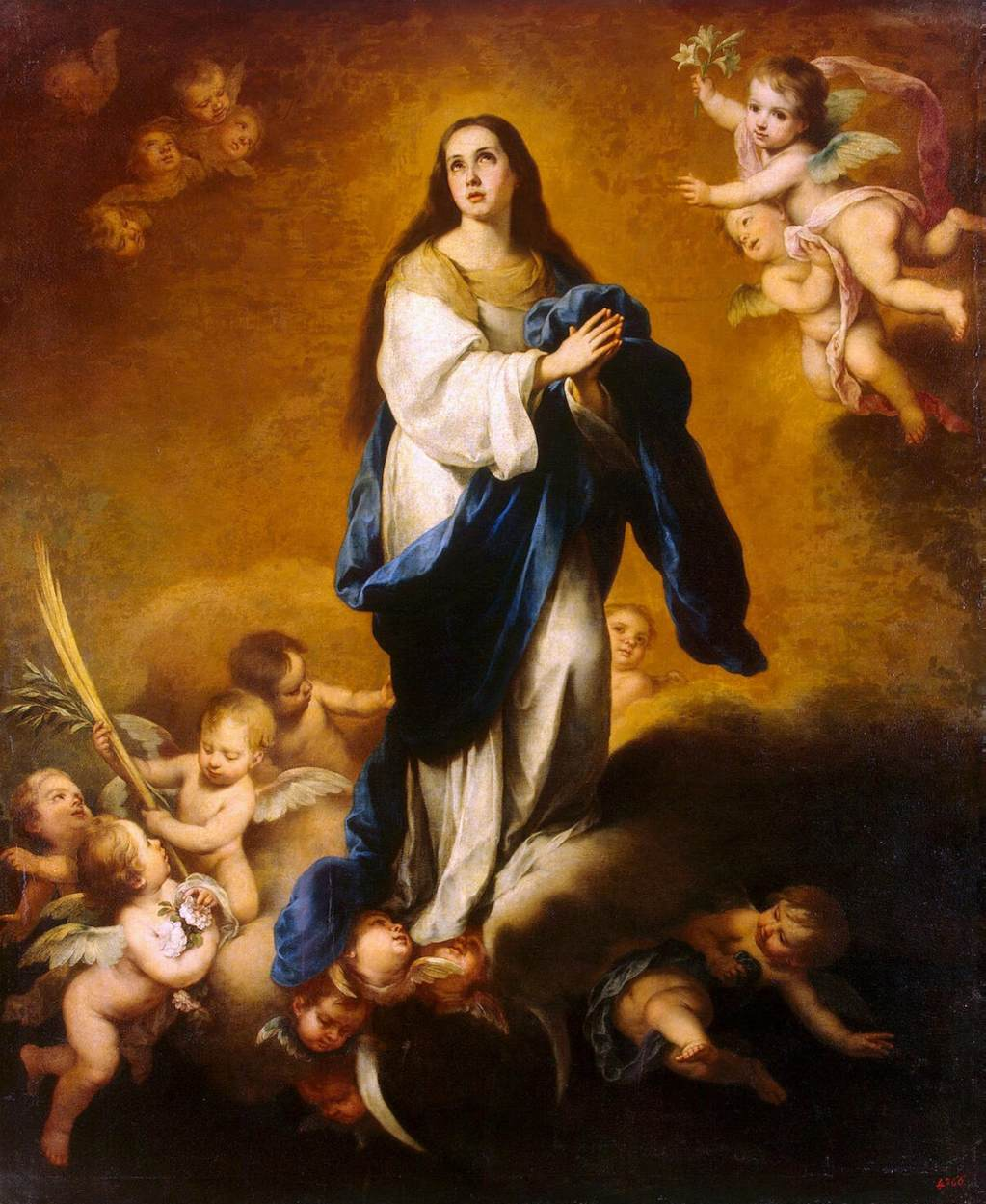
Esquilache Immaculate Conception (c. 1645-1655) by Bartolomé Esteban Murillo

The Esquilache Immaculate Conception is a 1645–1655 oil on canvas painting by Bartolomé Esteban Murillo. It is held in the Hermitage Museum, in Saint Petersburg.

It is named after Leopoldo de Gregorio, 1st Marquess of Esquilache, Spanish ambassador to Venice, who bought the work. On his death it passed to Cardinal Gregorio, who in turn left it to Pope Pius VI from the Braschi family, which finally sold it to its present owner in 1842. From 1924 to 1931 it hung in the Pushkin State Museum of Fine Arts before returning to the Hermitage, where it remains.
