= José Moñino, 1st Count of Floridablanca =

Spanish lawyer and civil servant (1728–1808)

The Most Excellent José Moñino 1st Count of Floridablanca GE
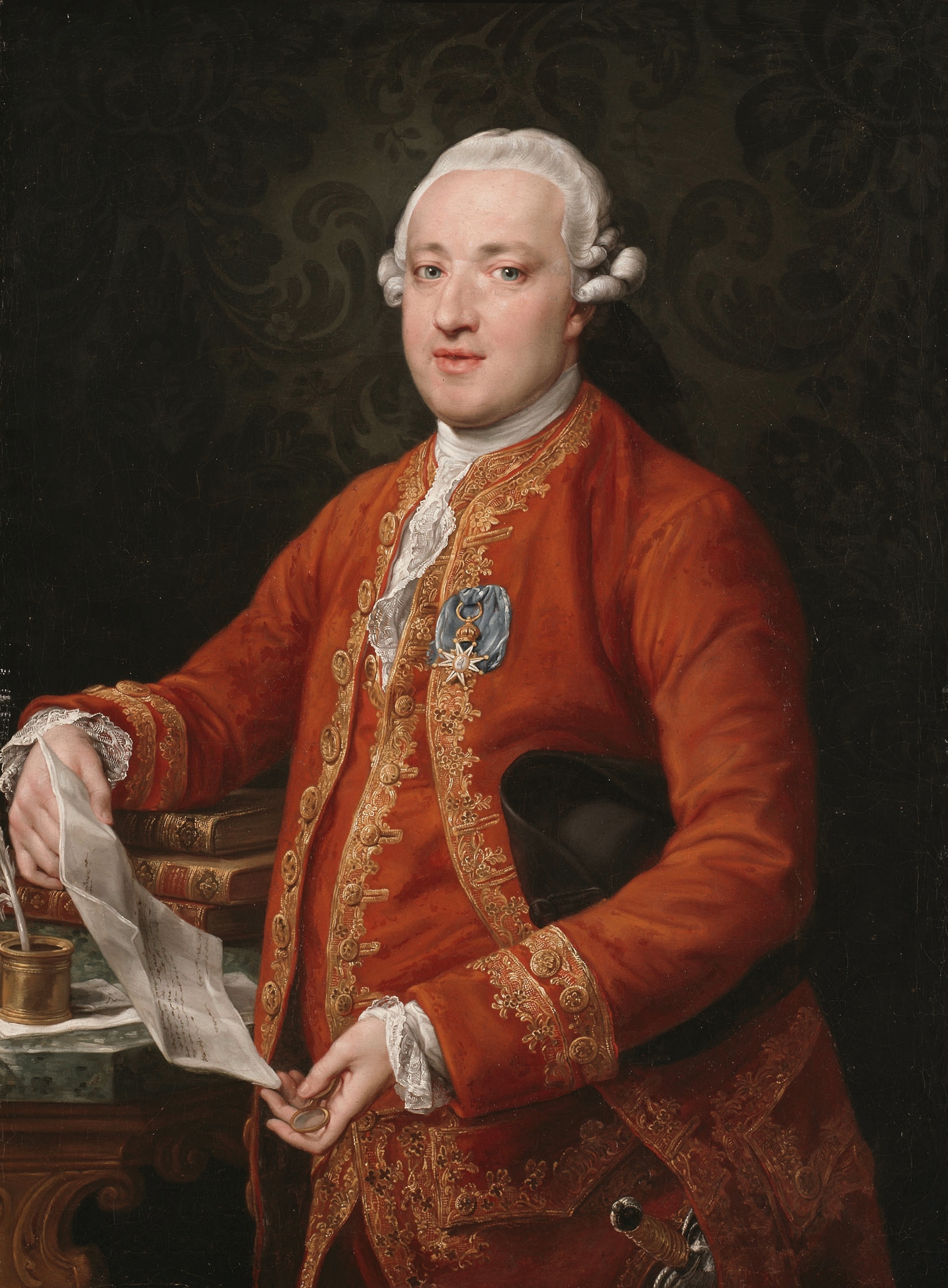
- Portrait by Pompeo Batoni, c. 1776

First Secretary of State of Spain
- In office 19 February 1777 – 28 February 1792
- Monarchs: Charles III; Charles IV
- Preceded by: Jerónimo Grimaldi, 1st Duke of Grimaldi
- Succeeded by: Count of Aranda

Secretary of State for Grace and Justice of Spain
- Interim
- In office 31 August 1782 – 25 April 1790
- Monarchs: Charles III; Charles IV
- First Secretary of State: Himself
- Preceded by: Manuel de Roda y Arrieta
- Succeeded by: Antonio Aniceto Porlier

Secretary of State for Indies of Spain
- Interim
- In office 17 June – 8 July 1787
- Monarch: Charles III
- First Secretary of State: Himself
- Preceded by: Marquess of Sonora
- Succeeded by: Antonio Porlier (Secretary of State for Grace and Justice of Indies); Antonio Valdés y Fernández Bazán (Secretary of State for War, Treasury, Commerce and Navigation of Indies)

President of the Supreme Central and Governing Junta of Spain and the Indies
- Interim
- In office 25 September – 1 October 1808
- Monarch: Ferdinand VII
- Preceded by: Position created
- Succeeded by: Himself
- In office 1 October – 30 December 1808
- Monarch: Ferdinand VII
- Preceded by: Himself (as acting president)
- Succeeded by: Count of Altamira (as acting president)

Personal details
- Born: 21 October 1728 Murcia, Spain
- Died: 30 December 1808 (aged 80) Seville, Spain

José Moñino y Redondo, 1st Count of Floridablanca (October 21, 1728 – December 30, 1808) was a Spanish statesman. He was the reformist chief minister of King Charles III of Spain, and also served briefly under Charles IV. He was arguably Spain's most effective statesman in the eighteenth century. In Spain, he is simply known as Conde de Floridablanca.

== Early life ==
He was born at Murcia in 1728 as the son of a retired army officer. He studied in Murcia and Orihuela, and later law at the University of Salamanca and was an esteemed advocate in the Spanish courts. He became a criminal prosecutor in Castile in 1766. He was given the task of investigating the Esquilache Riots that same year and acquired a reputation as a supporter of the King's reformist policies. He defended the expulsion of the Jesuits in 1767. The chief minister at the time, the Marquis of Esquilache, recognized his ability and made Moñino Spanish ambassador to Pope Clement XIV in 1772. He was rewarded with the title "Count of Floridablanca" in 1773 for succeeding in obtaining the support of the Pope in suppressing the Jesuits.

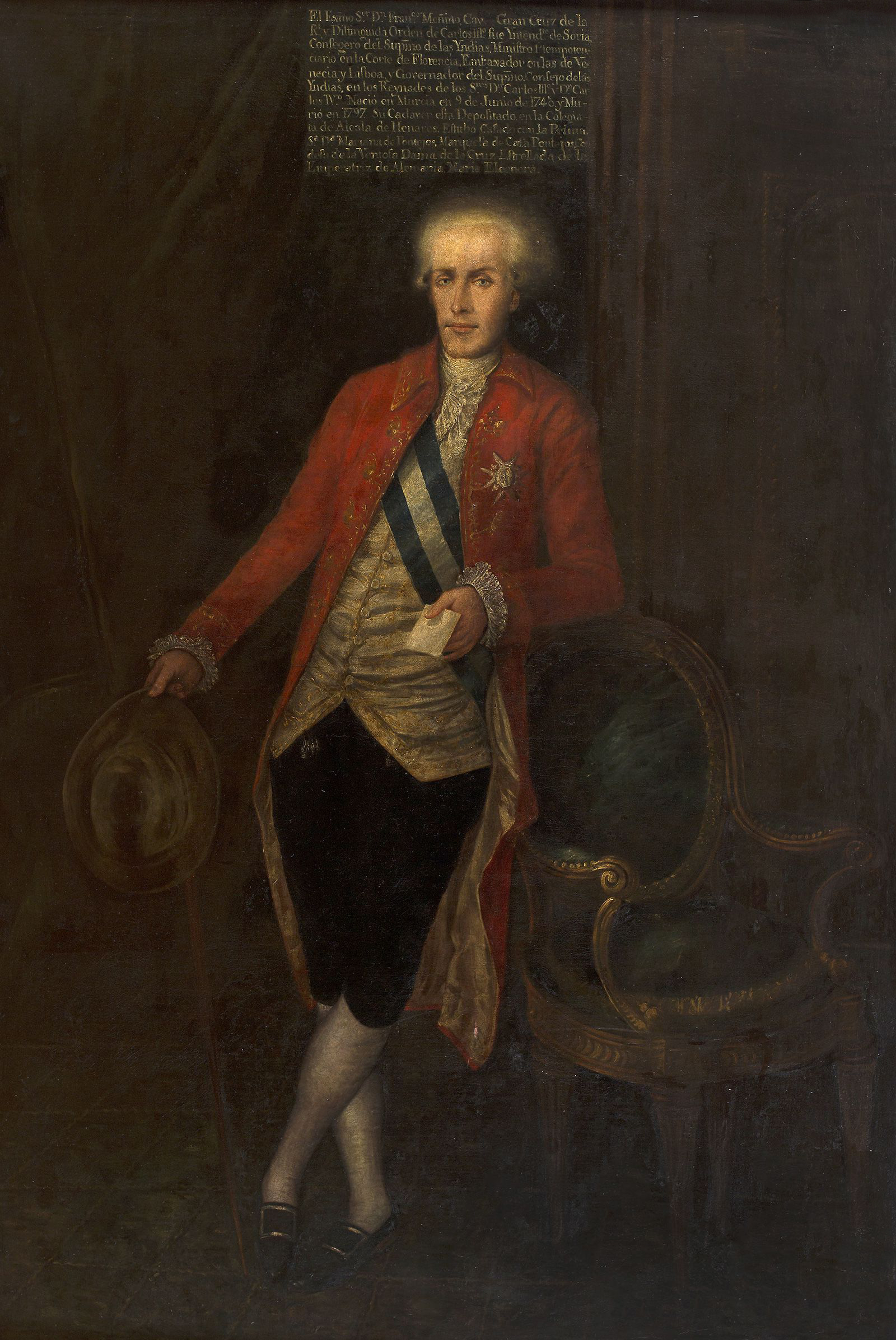
Francisco Moñino, younger brother of the Count of Floridablanca, was the ambassador in the Republic of Venice and Lisbon

== Chief minister ==
Floridablanca was named chief minister in 1777. He embarked on a thorough reform of the Spanish bureaucracy, establishing a true cabinet in 1787 (the Supreme Council of State). He established commercial freedom in the American colonies in 1778, founded the National Bank of San Carlos in 1782. He involved himself in university reform (Spain's universities had become increasingly lax since the 16th century) and improved press liberties. After the expulsion of the Jesuits, Spain's higher education system was left woefully understaffed; Floridablanca worked to hire new teachers and administrators and to modernize pedagogical methods. He also established new schools throughout Spain.

During his tenure, Madrid was rebuilt; a great deal of the city dates from this period. Floridablanca regulated the Madrid police and encouraged public works in the city.

=== American War of Independence ===
As the leader of Spain's foreign policy, Floridablanca sought prominently to promote the economic development of Spain. He signed trade agreements with Morocco and the Ottoman Empire and believed that good relations with Great Britain were key to Spain's growth. In spite of this, he was drawn reluctantly into the American Revolutionary War against the British. The war generally went well for Spain and Floridablanca succeeded in restoring much of Spain's prestige during the conflict.

In 1782, Britain ceded Menorca and Florida, which had been captured by Spanish forces, back to Spain. However, Spanish attempts to capture Gibraltar, Jamaica and invade Britain ended in failure. During the war, Spain negotiated a separate peace with Britain in spite of its alliance with France. Talks were held between Richard Cumberland and Thomas Hussey. These discussions ultimately fell through, and Spain was a signatory of the Peace of Paris in 1783.

Long-standing disputes with Portugal over the American colonies were resolved under Floridablanca's ministry and in the process Fernando Pó, Annobón, and Río Muni (modern Equatorial Guinea) were acquired from Portugal. Floridablanca strove to carve out an independent foreign policy for Spain, distancing the country from France which Spain had been a virtual satellite of since the War of the Spanish Succession.

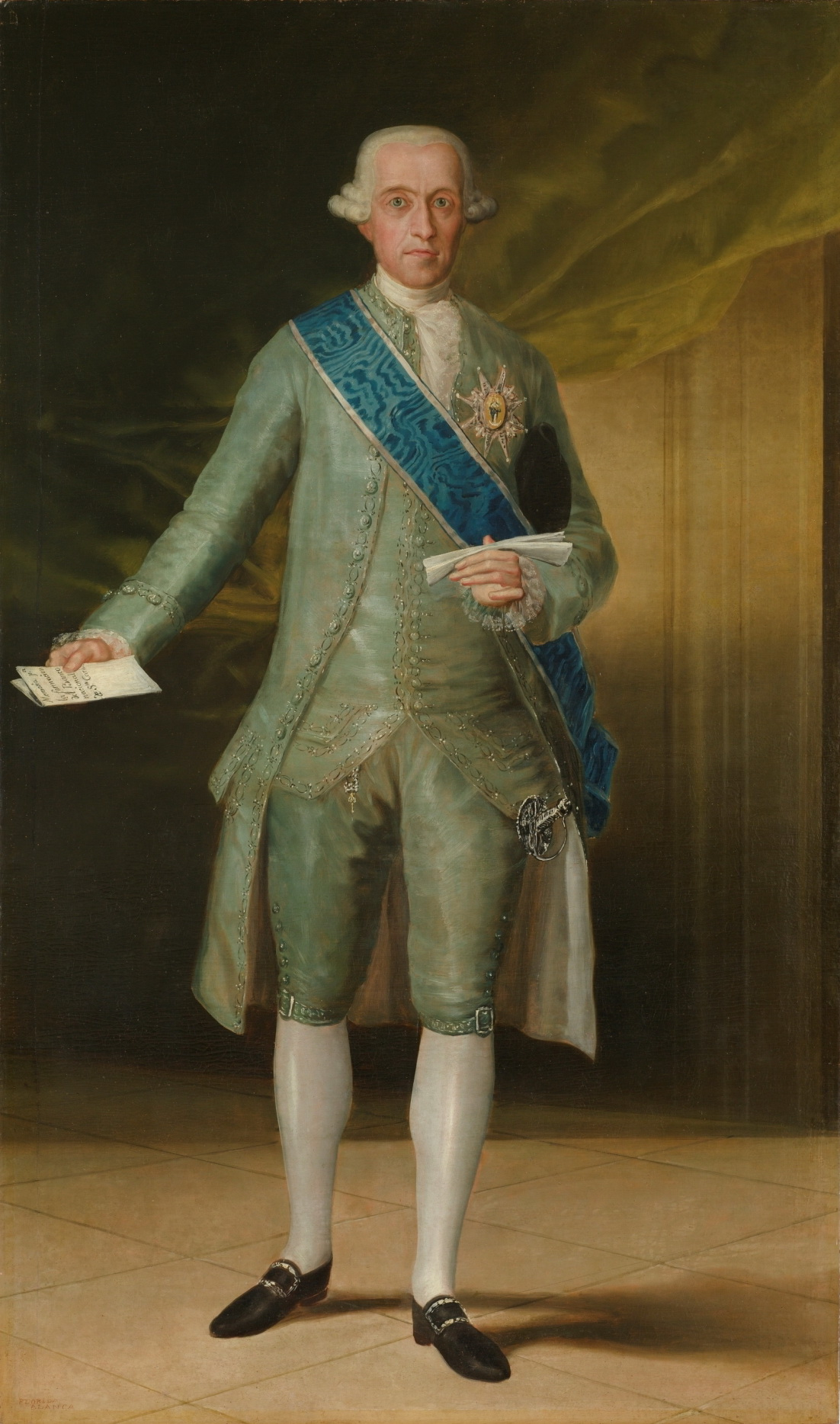
José Moñino, 1st Count of Floridablanca, painted by Goya

=== French Revolution ===
With the outbreak of the French Revolution in 1789 the liberal movement in Spain, which, in his own way, Floridablanca personified, was shocked to a halt. Floridablanca was forced to react to the situation and supported the First Coalition against revolutionary France. The events in France discredited the reformers at court and contributed to their downfall in the following years.

== Later life ==
His centralist policies brought him into conflict with regional interests, and he was often at odds with the Aragonese faction at court, which enjoyed many traditional liberties from the central government. The Aragonese faction, supported by the Queen's lover Manuel de Godoy and the Count of Aranda, finally succeeded in ousting Floridablanca from power in 1792 on charges of embezzlement. Floridablanca was imprisoned at the Citadel of Pamplona for three years and released only after the intervention of his brother. He was acquitted in 1795 although the ordeal weighed heavily upon him, and he retired to seclusion on his estates.

When Napoleon marched against Spain in 1808, there was a public outcry for Floridablanca to lead the country in resistance. He accepted the call and became the President of the Supreme Central and Governmental Junta, but at the age of 80, his strength failed him, and he died at Seville on December 30 that year.

Although an avid statesman, he left few writings, and only a few short treatises by his hand on jurisprudence were published during his lifetime.

The plant genus Monnina was named after him.

== See also ==
- List of prime ministers of Spain
- List of Spanish regents

Political offices
Preceded by Duke of Grimaldi	Secretary of State (Chief Minister); 1777–1792	Succeeded by Count of Aranda
