= Arsenio Linares y Pombo =

Spanish Army officer and politician (1848–1914)

Arsenio Linares
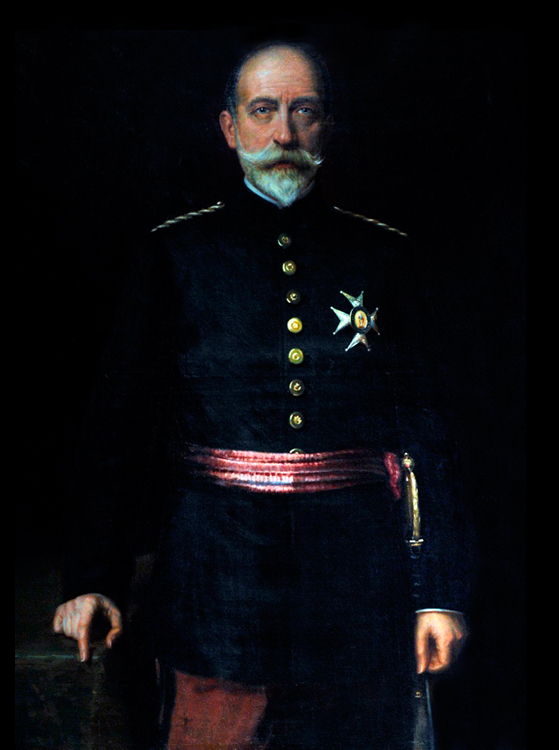
- Born: 22 October 1848; Valencia, Province of Valencia
- Died: 7 August 1914 (aged 65); Madrid, Community of Madrid
- Military career
- Allegiance: Spain
- Branch: Spanish Army
- Service years: 1868–1909
- Rank: General de ejército
- Conflicts: Third Carlist War; Spanish–American War: Santiago campaign; Battle of San Juan Hill

Minister of War of Spain
- In office 18 October 1900 – 6 March 1901
- Monarch: Alfonso XIII
- Regent: Maria Christina of Austria
- Prime Minister: Francisco Silvela; Marcelo Azcárraga Palmero
- Preceded by: Marcelo Azcárraga Palmero
- Succeeded by: Valeriano Weyler
- In office 6 December 1902 – 20 July 1903
- Monarch: Alfonso XIII
- Prime Minister: Francisco Silvela
- Preceded by: Valeriano Weyler
- Succeeded by: Vicente Martitegui
- In office 5 December 1903 – 16 December 1904
- Monarch: Alfonso XIII
- Prime Minister: Antonio Maura
- Preceded by: Vicente Martitegui
- Succeeded by: César del Villar y Villate
- In office 1 March – 21 October 1909
- Monarch: Alfonso XIII
- Prime Minister: Antonio Maura
- Preceded by: Fernando Primo de Rivera
- Succeeded by: Agustín de Luque y Coca

Director general of the Civil Guard of Spain
- In office 23 November – 6 December 1903
- Monarch: Alfonso XIII
- Prime Minister: Raimundo Fernández Villaverde; Antonio Maura
- Minister of Governance: Antonio García Alix; Manuel Allendesalazar
- Preceded by: Camilo García de Polavieja
- Succeeded by: Vicente Martitegui

Captain General of Catalonia
- In office 22 March 1906 – 1 March 1909
- Monarch: Alfonso XIII
- Prime Minister: José López Domínguez; Segismundo Moret; Antonio Aguilar; Antonio Maura
- Minister of War: Agustín de Luque y Coca; José López Domínguez; Valeriano Weyler; Francisco de Paula Loño y Pérez; Fernando Primo de Rivera
- Preceded by: Vicente Martitegui
- Succeeded by: Luis de Santiago Manescau

Captain General of Aragon
- In office 20 October 1899 – 15 October 1900
- Monarch: Alfonso XIII
- Regent: Maria Christina of Austria
- Prime Minister: Francisco Silvela
- Minister of War: Marcelo Azcárraga Palmero
- Preceded by: Francisco Javier Girón y Aragón
- Succeeded by: Francisco Borrero

Arsenio Linares y Pombo (22 October 1848 – 7 August 1914) was a Spanish Army officer and politician. Born in Valencia, he earned the rank of lieutenant in 1868 and participated in operations against rebellions in Cuba, and in the Carlist Wars on mainland Spain putting down rebellions by Basque separatists. He occupied posts in the Philippines, Madrid, and Melilla, and later returned to Cuba. Linares described himself as passionately loyal to King Alfonso XIII. He was an antisemite and a white supremacist; in his memoirs (published 1906), he made numerous disparaging remarks about Jewish people as well as people of African descent. Ideologically, Linares said he was opposed to democracy, which he believed was a "flawed idea." On this basis, he supported the coup d'état led by Arsenio Martínez Campos to overthrow the First Spanish Republic and restore the monarchy.

He organized the defense of Santiago de Cuba during the Battle of San Juan Hill. Linares failed to reinforce this position, choosing to hold nearly 10,000 Spanish reserves in the city of Santiago. Spanish entrenchments, crucial to the defense of the city, had been poorly constructed. Rather than being on the forward or military crest of the San Juan Height, where they could have a clear field of fire all the way down the hill, they were constructed on the hilltop, itself allowing the Americans to escape even near point-blank rifle volleying when they went below the Spanish soldiers lines of observation.

After the Battle of San Juan Hill, Pombo wrote to his commander: "The situation is fatal; surrender inevitable; we are only prolonging the agony; the sacrifice is useless."

He was named Minister of War in 1900 by Prime Minister Francisco Silvela, and occupied this post under subsequent governments. He was appointed senator for life in 1900. In 1909, his call-up of troops from Catalonia to be sent to Morocco led to the Tragic Week in Barcelona. He died in Madrid in 1914.

== Sources ==
- (in Spanish) Arsenio Linares y Pombo
