= Camilo García de Polavieja =

Spanish general

The Most Excellent The Marquess of Polavieja
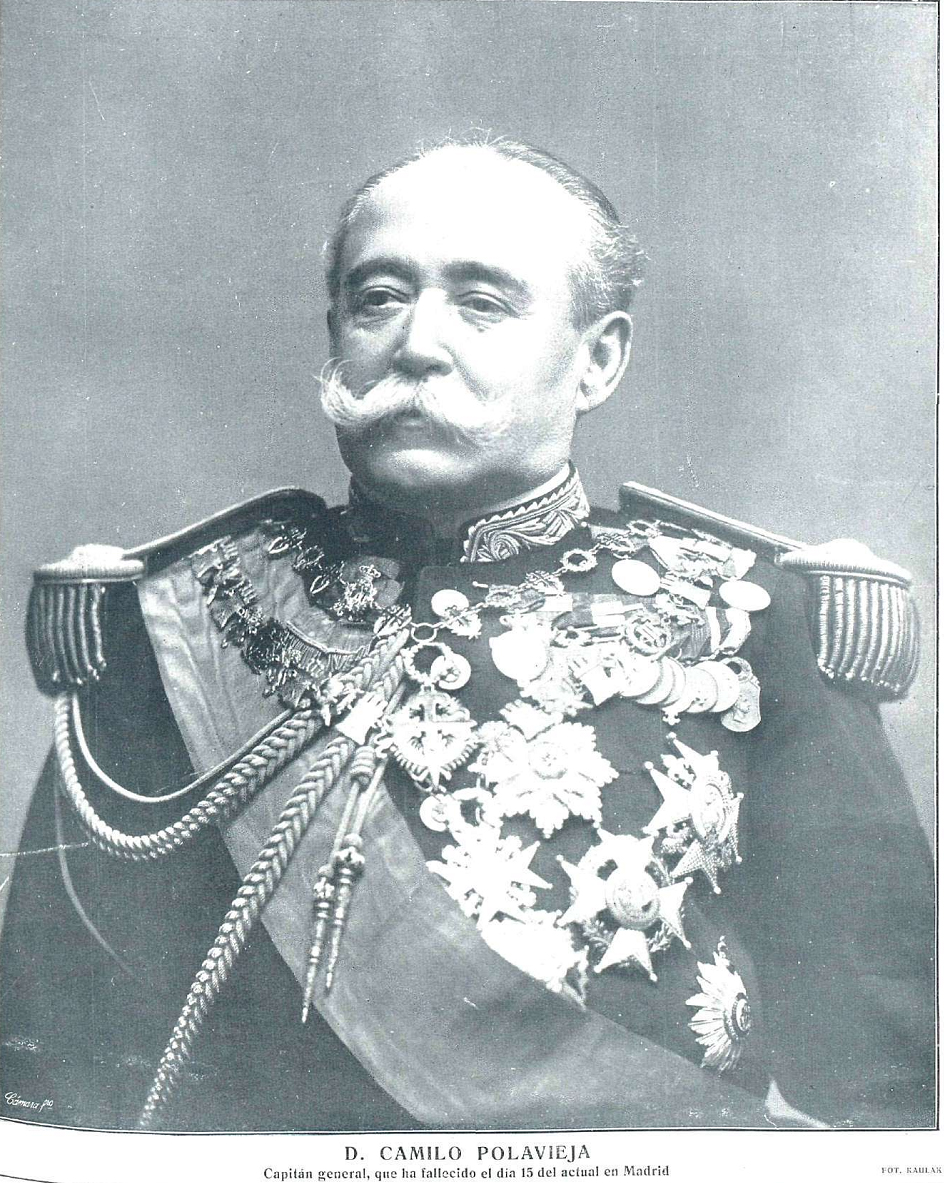
- Photograph by Kaulak

Minister of War of Spain
- In office March 4 – October 2, 1899
- Monarch: Alfonso XIII
- Prime Minister: Francisco Silvela
- Preceded by: Miguel Correa y García
- Succeeded by: Marcelo Azcárraga Palmero

General Director of the Civil Guard
- In office July 13 – November 23, 1903
- Monarch: Alfonso XIII
- Prime Minister: Francisco Silvela; Marquess of Pozo Rubio
- Minister of Governance: Antonio Maura; Antonio García Alix
- Preceded by: Luis de Pando y Sánchez
- Succeeded by: Arsenio Linares y Pombo

Chief of Staff of the Army of Spain
- In office December 25, 1904 – March 19, 1906
- Monarch: Alfonso XIII
- Prime Minister: Marcelo Azcárraga Palmero; Raimundo Fernández Villaverde; Eugenio Montero Ríos; Segismundo Moret
- Minister of War: César del Villar y Villate; Vicente Martitegui; Valeriano Weyler; Agustín de Luque y Coca
- Preceded by: Position created
- Succeeded by: Arsenio Linares y Pombo

Governor-General of the Philippines
- Interim
- In office December 13, 1896 – April 15, 1897
- Monarch: Alfonso XIII
- Regent: Maria Christina of Austria
- Prime Minister: Antonio Cánovas del Castillo
- Minister of Overseas: Tomás Castellano y Villarroya
- Preceded by: Ramón Blanco y Erenas
- Succeeded by: Vicente Martitegui

Governor of Cuba
- In office August 24, 1890 – June 20, 1892
- Monarch: Alfonso XIII
- Regent: Maria Christina of Austria
- Prime Minister: Antonio Cánovas del Castillo
- Minister of Overseas: Antonio María Fabié; Francisco Romero Robledo
- Preceded by: José Chinchilla
- Succeeded by: Alejandro Rodríguez Arias

Personal details
- Born: 13 July 1838 Madrid, Spain
- Died: 15 January 1914 (aged 75) Madrid, Spain

Military service
- Allegiance: Kingdom of Spain
- Rank
- Battles/wars: Third Carlist War; Dominican Restoration War; Ten Years' War; Philippine Revolution

Camilo García de Polavieja y del Castillo-Negrete, 1st Marquess of Polavieja (13 July 1838 – 15 January 1914) was a Spanish general, born in a family of merchants. He was a competent commander, but considered as brutal as Valeriano Weyler of Cuba. He was one of the most relevant military officers of the time and a famous regeneracionista.

== Early life and career ==
He enlisted voluntarily in the Navarro Regiment in 1855, where he distinguished himself in Africa. He received the Cross of Isabelle Maria Lucia for gallantry. In the Dominican Republic, he was assigned to command a battalion that took part in quelling the insurrections by the Dominicans during the Dominican Restoration War. He then took part in the Ten Years' War in Cuba, where Spain sent 70,000 men, and the Third Carlist War.

He was Colonel of the Princess Regiment and promoted to brigadier general in 1876 before being sent to Cuba. In Cuba, he was made Field Marshal and received the Cross of Military Merit. In 1882, he returned to Spain and was made a member of the Supreme Council of War and Navy, captain general of Andalusia, and Supreme Chief of the Infantry Inspectorate.

== Puerto Rico and Cuba ==
In 1888, Polavieja became governor-general of Puerto Rico, a post from which he resigned in 1889. A year later, in 1890, he was sent to succeed José Chinchilla as captain general of Cuba. Being one of the more competent administrators of the time, he resigned in 1892 as a protest against corruption of Francisco Romero Robledo, a well known politician for his corrupt practices, minister of Overseas during the premiership of Antonio Cánovas del Castillo. He was later known as the Butcher of Cuba.

== Governor General of the Philippines ==
The revolution in Cuba led by Antonio Maceo Grajales inspired Philippine insurgents to revolt as well. Being the last important colony under control of Spain, the Spanish government tried to contain the Philippine Revolution under the administration of Ramon Blanco, Marquess of Peña Plata.

When the Philippine revolution broke out in August 1896, Polavieja was appointed second corporal and served as Blanco's second-in-command. However, his partnership with Blanco did not last long.

The further spread of the insurgency in the Philippines led to the turnover of the post of governor general to Blanco's second-in-command, lieutenant general Polavieja. The Filipino historian Gregorio Zaide notes that Polavieja was installed with the help of powerful Spanish friars including the archbishop of Manila during that time.

As soon as he took over, he implemented many policies to curb corruption and improve the bureaucracy. He began repression in the form of deportations accompanied by promises of pardons and trials, many of these ending in capital punishment. Under Polavieja's direction, military operations began as soon as reinforcements arrived, and they actively pursued the rebels in their mountain bases.

By August 1896, there were 500 soldiers in Manila and 700 in the rest of the archipelago. Native mercenaries numbered around 6,000. By January 1897, a total of 25,462 officers and men had arrived from Spain. Polavieja had an available force of over 12,000 men to suppress the rebels in Luzon alone. On February 13, 1897, he opened his first phase, the Cavite campaign. Polavieja advanced against the revolutionaries with 16,000 men armed with Spanish M93s, and one field battery. They were led by General José de Lachambre, and many of the soldiers he led were from Pampanga, fired during Blanco's administration. He had scarcely reconquered half of Cavite when he resigned, owing to disagreements with superiors in Madrid and his bad health. He did, however, disperse every major rebel contingent in Cavite. Around 4,000 rebels died in jails of Manila.

== Rizal execution ==
Polavieja oversaw the court martial and death of José Rizal on December 30, 1896. Twenty four more people were executed with Rizal.

Polavieja faced condemnation by his countrymen after his return to Spain. While visiting Girona, circulars were distributed among the crowd bearing Rizal's last verses, his portrait, and the charge that Polavieja was responsible for the loss of the Philippines to the United States. Ramon Blanco later presented his sash and sword to the Rizal family as an apology.

== Death ==
He went back to Spain and went on to influence the Government of Spain. He declared preparation for a neutral or third party but his manifesto was prohibited for publication. He died of hepatitis in 1914.

== Media portrayal ==
- Portrayed by Tony Mabesa in the 1998 film, José Rizal.

Government offices
Preceded by Ramón Blanco y Erenas	Governor General of the Philippines; 1896–1897	Succeeded by José de Lachambre
