= Ricardo Wall =

Spanish army officer and prime minister of Spain (1694–1777)

The Most Excellent Ricardo Wall KOS OSL
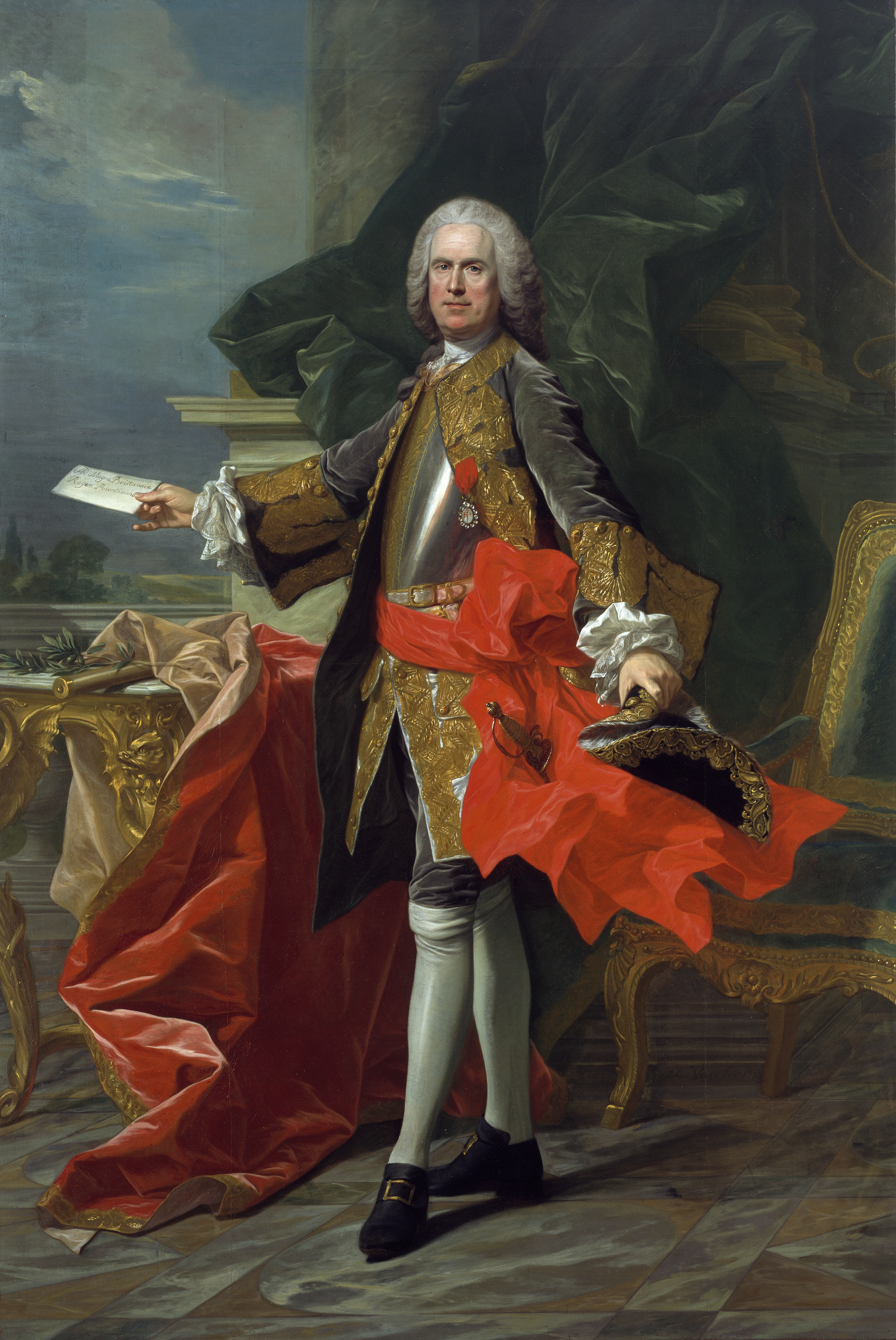
- Portrait by Louis-Michel van Loo, 1753

First Secretary of State of Spain
- In office 15 May 1754 – 9 October 1763
- Monarchs: Ferdinand VI; Charles III
- Preceded by: Fernando de Silva, 12th Duke of Alba
- Succeeded by: Jerónimo Grimaldi, 1st Duke of Grimaldi

Secretary of State for Indies of Spain
- In office 22 July – 20 August 1754
- Monarch: Ferdinand VI
- First Secretary of State: Himself
- Preceded by: Position created
- Succeeded by: Julian de Arriaga

Secretary of State for War of Spain
- In office 21 June 1759 – 1 September 1763
- Monarchs: Ferdinand VI; Charles III
- First Secretary of State: Himself
- Preceded by: Sebastian de Eslava
- Succeeded by: Marquess of Esquilache

Personal details
- Born: 5 November 1694 Nantes, Kingdom of France
- Died: 26 December 1777 (aged 83)

Ricardo Wall y Devereux (5 November 1694 – 26 December 1777) was a Spanish military officer, statesman and diplomat who served as Chief Minister of Spain from 1754 to 1763.

== Early life ==
Wall belonged to a family settled in Kilmallock, one of whom was Bishop of Limerick. Richard "Ricardo" Wall y Devereux was born at Nantes to a family of Irish Jacobite refugees, supporters of the Catholic James II, deposed King of England, Scotland and Ireland. He was baptized two days after his birth at the Cathedral Church of Saint Nicholas in unfavourable circumstances: his father, Matthew "Matías" Wall of Killmallock, County Limerick, a long-serving officer in King James II's cavalry, was absent. His family then lived in the "pit of the well of the silver" supported by a relative, probably Gilbert Wall, the clockmaker.

Nothing much is known about his early years. Around 1710, he was introduced as page to the Bavarian Princess Marie Anne de Bourbon, Duchess of Vendôme who was Duchess d'Étampes in her own right (her father was Henry III Jules de Bourbon, prince de Condé). In 1716, he left France and joined the Royal House of Spain following a letter of request from the Prime Minister, Cardinal Alberoni, signed by the 38-year-old Dowager Duchess of Vendôme, Marie-Anne de Borbón-Condé.

== Military career ==
Wall entered the Colegio Real de Guardiamarinas, founded at Cádiz by José Patiño in 1717, graduating in the second year of its foundation. In the War of the Quadruple Alliance he was then commissioned in the Spanish Navy serving on Real San Felipe (74 guns), under the command of Admiral Gaztañeta, which participated in the Sicilian campaign (1718) until the defeat of the Spanish fleet at the Battle of Cape Passaro. Wall was then seconded to the Spanish Regiment of Hibernia, commanded by the Marquis of Lede taking part in land battles such as Milazzo and Francavilla. During the subsequent defence of Ceuta (1720–21), Wall was appointed aide-de-camp to the Marquis before being promoted captain in the Regiment of Batavia.

In 1727, Wall accompanied his compatriot James Fitz-James Stuart, 2nd Duke of Berwick (1696–1738) during his ambassadorial visit to Peter II of Russia; the Scottish Duke was also Duke of Liria and Jérica, heir of the 1st Duke of Berwick, an illegitimate son of James II of England.

Wall was posted on other missions by the Duke of Líria and Jérica, such as to King Frederick William I Prussia, who decorated him as a Knight de la Générosité. While a Stuart ambassadorship to Berlin did not materialise, Wall took the opportunity to cultivate numerous contacts throughout Europe, in Parma, Vienna, Dresden as well as in Saint Petersburg and Moscow.

He returned to Spain in 1729. Between 1732 and 1734, he served in the expedition to Tuscany which placed Prince Carlos on the throne of Parma. Shortly after, he took part in the War of Naples (1734–35), seeing action at Capua, Messina and Syracuse.

In 1737 he was appointed a Knight of the Military Order of Santiago and in 1741, was created Commander of the Commandery of Peñausende, which in addition included Peralejos de Abajo, Saucelle, Saldeana and Barrueco Pardo (now in the provinces of Zamora and Salamanca).

In 1740 he was appointed colonel of France's 2nd Dragoon Regiment, which while under his command displayed his livery colours and family motto: Aut Caesar aut nullus.

Appointed captain-general in 1744, he participated in the Lombardy campaign in the War of the Austrian Succession, being deployed by Infante Philip of Spain "in the boldest attacks". Promoted brigadier in 1747, he formed a useful friendship with one of the most influential courtiers of the era, the Duke of Huéscar (later Duke of Alba).

Wounded in action at Piacenza (1746), he transferred to diplomatic service and, in May 1747, was posted to Genoa on a temporary mission "concerning solely military matters"; soon after afterwards, he was posted to London by the new Spanish Minister of State, José de Carvajal, a friend of Huéscar.

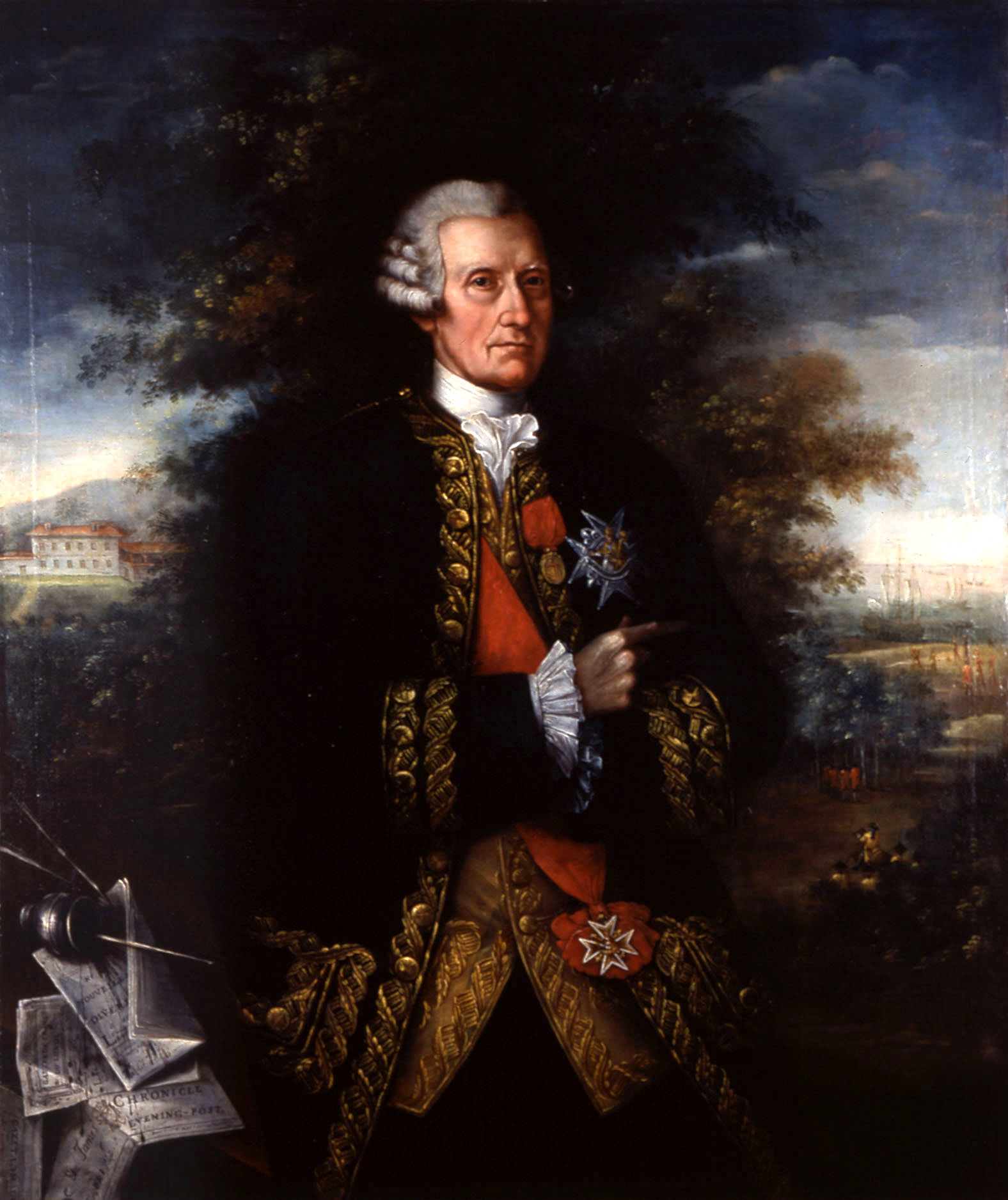
Portrait of Wall

== Ambassador in London ==
Wall's diplomatic mission to London was for negotiating peace between the Bourbons and Great Britain, but it soon ran into difficulties not least because of reservations in British ministerial quarters about his Irish and Jacobite roots, but also from infighting on the Spanish side by the Marquess of Tabuérniga (later de La Ensenada) who had coveted his position.

The Marqués de La Ensenada was recalled to Madrid, leaving General Wall to enjoy the trappings of ambassadorial residence at Soho Square. Wall is depicted in a portrait by Charles-André van Loo (now at the National Gallery, Dublín), and he sponsored the Arts in general, commissioning a "Santiago" by Giovanni Battista Tiepolo for his private chapel (now hanging at the Szépmüvészeti Múzeum in Budapest), as well as written works such as those by Tobias Smollett, including the translation of Don Quixote (1755) which is dedicated to him.

== Prime Minister of Spain ==
In 1754 Wall was recalled from London to Madrid becoming Minister of Foreign Affairs, after the death of José de Carvajal. A few months later he played a part in driving Carvajal's successor the Marquess de La Ensenada from office, thereby also helping Huéscar and the British Ambassador, Sir Benjamin Keene. Wall served as chief minister until 1763, when the Duke of Grimaldi succeeded him.

The despatches of the British Minister, Sir Benjamin Keene, and those of his successor, George Hervey, 2nd Earl of Bristol, contain many references to Wall. Though a constant partisan of peace and good relations with Britain, Wall was firm in asserting the rights of the government he served. During the early stages of the Seven Years' War (1756–63) he insisted on claiming compensation for the excesses of British privateers in Spanish waters. He frequently complained to British officials about the difficulties which these adventurers' violence was causing. As an expatriate, despite having previously represented the French Crown, he was often taunted by various French factions.

Wall himself was more concerned that Britain's colonial acquisitions from France could mean that Spain's South American Empire was threatened. The new King Charles III (1759–88) retained Wall as prime minister. When Spain declared War in 1761, Wall as prime minister naturally carried out his King's decree, although he later confessed to Lord Bristol, the British ambassador, some regret with the benefit of hindsight that he could see the failure of his efforts in preserving the peace. The close relations between Charles III and the French Bourbon Kings later made General Wall's position as prime minister very trying. Yet King Charles, who detested changing his ministers, refused all Wall's requests to retire, till Wall exhorted himself in 1763 by elaborately affecting an imaginary eye disease.

Throughout his Spanish government service Wall built a network of relationships which survived his tenure for several decades perhaps even helping Spain during the following reign of King Charles IV. Among the relationships he developed were those with the Duke of Grimaldi, the Count of Aranda, the Count of Campomanes, Manuel de Roda, Cayetano Pignatelli, 3rd Marquis of Rubí as well as with various ambassadors from around Europe such as the Counts of Fuentes, and also with commissioners from the colonies, like Ambrosio de Funes Villalpando, Count of Ricla.

Among his committed Irish supporters were the engineer William Bowles (1720–84) who studied the geology of Spain, Pedro Fitz-James Stuart, the de Lacy family, Alejandro O'Reilly, Arnold later Lord Mahoney, Carlos McCarthy, Francis Nangle, Ambrosio O'Higgins and Bernard Ward, 1st Viscount Bangor.

Wall extended friendship and knowledge with others such as Francisco Pérez Bayer, Jose Clavijo y Fajardo, Benito Bails, Celestino Mutis, Jose Agustín de Llano y de la Cuadra (Spanish Ambassador to Vienna under Emperor Joseph II and nephew of one of Spain's First Secretaries of State), Sebastián de la Cuadra, 1st Marquis of Villarías, numerous members of Juan de Iriarte's family, Bernardino del Campo, Ambassador José Nicolás de Azara (a follower of William Bowles' work) and Juan de Chindulza.

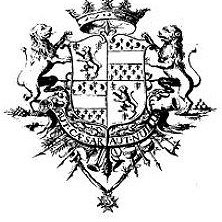
General Wall's coat of arms

He was elected a Fellow of the Royal Society in 1753.

== Retirement ==
Charles III of Spain gave General Wall a handsome reward for his service. Wall received a grant for life of crown land known as the Soto de Roma, near Granada, later conferred upon Manuel de Godoy, before being awarded to the Duke of Wellington.

Wall spent the rest of his life, between homes in Alhama de Almeria and near Granada, welcoming all visitors and particularly English travelers exploring Spain's culture. He left a reputation as being a very able minister as well as a most witty conversationalist.

He died on 26 December 1777, imparting a few words to his friend and confessor, Juan Miguel Kayser. A subsequent lawsuit between his natural heirs – namely, his cousin Eduardo Wall and family – and those of his confessor, somewhat clouded his memory for a while.

Wall did not marry and left no children. His closest relative, Eduardo Wall, married María condesa de Armildez de Toledo, whose remaining descendants include the Condes de Fuentes and de Floridablanca.

NB: some clarifications on General Wall's life: contrary to Coxe's writings he was never sent on a mission to Spanish America nor did he lay plans for retaking Jamaica from the British. Coxe confuses one John Savy, nicknamed Miguel Wall, with Richard Wall, nor was Wall ever Ambassador to The Netherlands.

== See also ==
- List of prime ministers of Spain
- Marquesado de La Cañada
- Condado de Sástago
- Casa de Manrique de Lara

== Bibliography ==
- Coxe's Memoirs of the Kings of Spain of the House of Bourbon (London, 1815).
- Diario del viaje a Moscovia, 1727–1730, of the duke of Liria (vol. xciii. of the Documentos inéditos para la historia de España), (Madrid, 1842, et seq.).
- Téllez Alarcia, D., "La misión secreta de D. Ricardo Wall en Londres (1747–1748)" in Brocar, 24, 2000, pp. 49–71.
- Téllez Alarcia, D., "Guerra y regalismo a comienzos del reinado de Carlos III. El final del ministerio Wall" in Hispania, 209, 2001, pp. 1051–90.
- Téllez Alarcia, D., "L’exil jacobite irlandais et l’Ouest de la France (1691–1716)" in DENÉCHÈRE, Y. y MARAIS, J. L. (dirs.), Les étrangers dans l’Ouest de la France (XVIIIe–XXe siècle). Annales de Bretagne et des Pays de l’Ouest, 109, 2002, pp. 25–40.
- Téllez Alarcia, D., "La supuesta anglofilia de D. Ricardo Wall. Filias y fobias políticas durante el reinado de Fernando VI" in Revista de Historia Moderna. Anales de la Universidad de Alicante, 21, 2003, pp. 501–36.
- Téllez Alarcia, D., "Richard Wall: light and shade of an Irish minister in Spain (1694–1777)" in Irish Studies Review, 11.2, August 2003, pp. 123–36.
- Téllez Alarcia, D., "El grupo irlandés bajo el ministerio Wall (1754–63)" in *VILLAR GARCÍA, M. B. y PEZZI CRISTÓBAL, P. (eds.), Los Extranjeros en la España Moderna: Actas del I Coloquio Internacional. Málaga 28–30 de noviembre de 2002, 2 tomos, Málaga, 2003, Tomo II, pp. 737–50.
- Téllez Alarcia, D., "Anson, Wall y el cambio de rol del 'Lago español' en el enfrentamiento colonial Hispano-británico (1740–1762)", in Tiempos Modernos, 11, 2004, pp. 1–8.
- Téllez Alarcia, D., "El joven Campomanes y el ministro Wall (1754–63)" in MATEOS DORADO, D. (ed.), Campomanes doscientos años después, Oviedo, 2003, pp. 417–31.
- Téllez Alarcia, D., D. Ricardo Wall. Aut Caesar aut nullus, Madrid, 2008.
- Téllez Alarcia, D., Absolutismo e Ilustración en la España del s. XVIII. El Despotismo Ilustrado de D. Ricardo Wall, Madrid, 2010
- Téllez Alarcia, D., El ministerio Wall. La "España Discreta" del "Ministro Olvidado", Madrid, 2012.

Political offices
Preceded by Duke of Hueścar	Secretary of State (Chief Minister); 1754–1763	Succeeded by Duke of Grimaldi
