= Carlos Masquelet =

Spanish Republican Army general

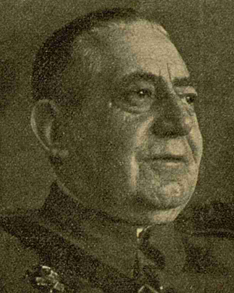
- General Masquelet in September 1938

Chief of Staff of the Spanish Army
- In office 17 February 1933 – 4 April 1935
- Preceded by: Manuel Goded Llopis
- Succeeded by: Francisco Franco

Minister of War of Spain
- In office 3 April 1935 – 6 May 1935
- President: Niceto Alcalá-Zamora
- Prime Minister: Alejandro Lerroux
- Preceded by: Alejandro Lerroux
- Succeeded by: José María Gil-Robles y Quiñones
- In office 19 February 1936 – 13 May 1936
- President: Manuel Azaña
- Prime Minister: Diego Martínez Barrio
- Preceded by: Nicolás Molero
- Succeeded by: Santiago Casares Quiroga

Personal details
- Born: 14 July 1871 Ferrol, Galicia, Spain
- Died: 14 September 1948 (aged 77) La Jonquera, Catalonia, Spain
- Awards: Royal and Military Order of Saint Hermenegild

Military service
- Allegiance: Kingdom of Spain (1896–1931); Spanish Republic (1931–1937); Nationalist Spain (1936–1937)
- Branch/service: Spanish Army
- Years of service: 1896–1937
- Rank: General of the Army
- Battles/wars: Rif War; Spanish Civil War; Siege of Madrid

Carlos Masquelet Lacaci (14 July 1871 – 14 September 1948) was a Spanish military officer. During the Second Spanish Republic, he held various positions, including Chief of the Central General Staff of the Army and Minister of War on two mandates. He played a significant role during the Spanish Civil War, designing a defensive front based on fortifications, distributed in four rings, which were built for the Siege of Madrid.

== Biography ==
Born in Ferrol in 1871,he entered the General Military Academy of Toledo in 1896. He participated in the Rif War Moroccan campaigns. A military officer from the Corps of Engineers, he was a Freemason and of republican-liberal ideology.

During the Dictatorship of Miguel Primo de Rivera, Masquelet worked as a professor at the Academy of Engineers and was the author of the construction project for the new Ferrol Naval Base, whose works he personally directed in the 1920s.

Promoted to the position of army general in 1930, upon the proclamation of the Second Spanish Republic, Masquelet was appointed Chief of the Central General Staff by the President of the Council of Ministers, Manuel Azaña, and later Minister of War in the government headed by Alejandro Lerroux, between April 3 and May 6, 1935. On August 1, 1935, he was appointed Military Commander of the Balearic Islands.

Despite being Chief of the Central General Staff, he played no role during the Asturian miners' strike due to the distrust that a sincere republican like Masquelet inspired in the radical-conservative government. Instead, the Minister of War, Diego Hidalgo, authorized General Francisco Franco to take command of the Central General Staff. With the electoral victory of the Popular Front in the 1936 Spanish general election, Masquelet once again occupied the ministerial portfolio of war (Note: Aunque entre el 19 y el 24 de febrero de 1936 la cartera fue asumida interina por el general José Miaja.) in the governments successively presided over by Manuel Azaña and Augusto Barcia Trelles, between 19 February and 13 May 1936.

Once the Spanish Civil War, Masquelet remained loyal to the Republic. Until then, he had been head of the Military Household of the President of the Republic. He played a prominent role in the fortification of Madrid through the design of a defensive front based on fortifications, distributed in four rings, which were built for the defense of Madrid (November 1936). On July 19, 1937, he was placed on reserve status, although after the restructuring of the Spanish Republican Army in December, he was appointed head of the new Fortifications Commission.

At the end of the conflict he went into exile in France, although years later he returned to Spain, where he died in 1948.

== Awards ==
- Royal and Military Order of Saint Hermenegild

== Bibliography ==
- Alpert Michael (2013). The Republican Army in the Spanish Civil War, 1936-1939. Cambridge University Press. ISBN 978-84-3230-682-2.
- Carlos Blanco (2005). Franco. La pasión por el poder. Barcelona: Planeta.
- Carlos de Arce (1998). Los generales de Franco. Seuba Ediciones.
- Carlos Fernández (1988). La guerra civil en Galicia. La Voz de Galicia.
- Hugh Thomas (1976). Historia de la Guerra Civil Española. Barcelona: Círculo de Lectores. ISBN 84-226-0874-X.
- José Ramón (2008) [2001]. Gobiernos y ministros españoles en la edad contemporánea. Madrid: CSIC. ISBN 978-84-00-08737-1.
- Cristobal Zaragoza (1983). Ejército Popular y militares de la República, 1936-1939. Barcelona: Ed. Planeta.

== Sources ==
- Alpert, Michael (2013). The Republican Army in the Spanish Civil War, 1936-1939. Cambridge University Press.
- Blanco Escolá, Carlos (2005). Franco. La pasión por el poder. Barcelona: Planeta.
- de Arce, Carlos (1998). Los generales de Franco. Seuba Ediciones.
- Fernández, Carlos (1988). La guerra civil en Galicia. La Voz de Galicia.
- Thomas, Hugh (1976). Historia de la Guerra Civil Española. Barcelona: Círculo de Lectores. ISBN 84-226-0874-X.
- Urquijo Goitia, José Ramón (2008) [2001]. Gobiernos y ministros españoles en la edad contemporánea. Madrid: CSIC.
- Zaragoza, Cristóbal (1983). Ejército Popular y militares de la República, 1936-1939. Barcelona: Ed. Planeta.

Political offices
Preceded by Manuel Goded Llopis	Chief of Staff of the Spanish Army; 17 February 1933 – 4 April 1935	Succeeded by Francisco Franco
Preceded by Manuel Azaña	Minister of War of Spain; 19 February 1936 – 13 May 1936; 3 April 1935 – 6 May 1935	Succeeded by José María Gil-Robles y Quiñones
Preceded by Alejandro Lerroux	Minister of War of Spain; 19 February 1936 – 13 May 1936; 3 April 1935 – 6 May 1935	Succeeded by Nicolás Molero
