= Marcelo Azcárraga =

Spanish politician (1832–1915)

The Most Excellent Marcelo Azcárraga
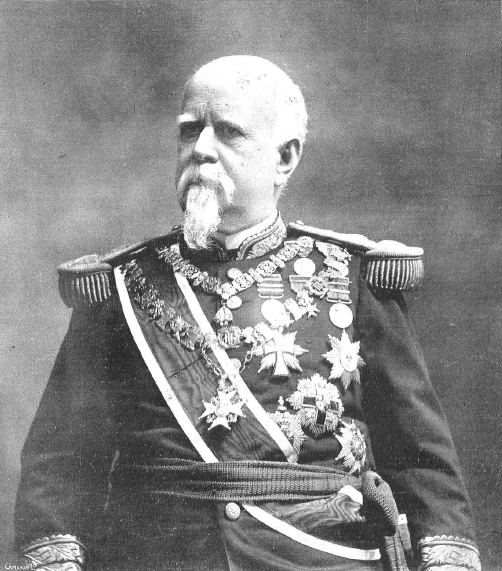
- Azcárraga in 1907

Prime Minister of Spain
- In office 16 December 1904 – 25 January 1905
- Monarch: Alfonso XIII
- Preceded by: Antonio Maura
- Succeeded by: Raimundo Fernández
- In office 23 October 1900 – 6 March 1901
- Monarch: Alfonso XIII
- Preceded by: Francisco Silvela
- Succeeded by: Práxedes Mateo Sagasta
- In office 21 August 1897 – 4 October 1897
- Monarch: Alfonso XIII
- Preceded by: Himself (as interim)
- Succeeded by: Práxedes Mateo Sagasta
- Interim
- In office 8 August – 21 August 1897
- Monarch: Alfonso XIII
- Preceded by: Antonio Cánovas del Castillo
- Succeeded by: Himself

President of the Senate of Spain
- In office 18 October – 8 November 1900
- Monarch: Alfonso XIII
- Preceded by: Arsenio Martínez Campos
- Succeeded by: Count of Tejada de Baldosera
- In office 15 May 1903 – 16 December 1904
- Monarch: Alfonso XIII
- Preceded by: Eugenio Montero Ríos
- Succeeded by: Marquess of Pidal
- In office 10 May 1907 – 14 April 1910
- Monarch: Alfonso XIII
- Preceded by: Eugenio Montero Ríos
- Succeeded by: Eugenio Montero Ríos
- In office 8 November 1913 – 30 May 1915
- Monarch: Alfonso XIII
- Preceded by: Eugenio Montero Ríos
- Succeeded by: Joaquín Sánchez de Toca

Minister of the Navy of Spain
- Interim
- In office 23 October 1900 – 31 October 1900
- Monarch: Alfonso XIII
- Prime Minister: Himself
- Preceded by: Francisco Silvela
- Succeeded by: José Ramos Izquierdo
- In office 16 December 1904 – 6 January 1905
- Monarch: Alfonso XIII
- Prime Minister: Himself
- Preceded by: José Ferrándiz y Niño
- Succeeded by: Eduardo Cobián

Minister of War of Spain
- In office 5 July 1890 – 11 December 1892
- Monarch: Alfonso XIII
- Prime Minister: Antonio Cánovas del Castillo
- Preceded by: Eduardo Bermúdez Reina
- Succeeded by: José López Domínguez
- In office 23 March 1895 – 4 October 1897
- Monarch: Alfonso XIII
- Prime Minister: Antonio Cánovas del Castillo; Himself
- Preceded by: José López Domínguez
- Succeeded by: Miguel Correa y García
- In office 2 October 1899 – 18 October 1900
- Monarch: Alfonso XIII
- Prime Minister: Himself; Práxedes Mateo Sagasta; Francisco Silvela
- Preceded by: Camilo García de Polavieja
- Succeeded by: Arsenio Linares y Pombo

Captain General of Valencia
- In office 22 February 1884 – 5 July 1890
- Monarchs: Alfonso XII; Alfonso XIII
- Regent: Maria Christina of Austria
- Prime Minister: Antonio Cánovas del Castillo; Práxedes Mateo Sagasta
- Minister of War: Jenaro Quesada; Joaquín Jovellar; Ignacio María del Castillo; Manuel Cassola; Thomás O'Ryan y Vázquez; José Chinchilla; Eduardo Bermúdez de la Reina
- Preceded by: Manuel de Salamanca Negrete
- Succeeded by: Alejandro Rodríguez Arias y Rodulfo

Personal details
- Born: Marcelo de Azcárraga Palmero; 4 September 1832 Intramuros, Manila, Spanish Philippines
- Died: 30 May 1915 (aged 82) Madrid, Spain
- Party: Liberal-Conservative Party
- Education: University of Santo Tomas; Colegio de San Juan de Letran

Marcelo Azcárraga Palmero (4 September 1832 – 30 May 1915) was a Spanish politician and military officer who was Prime Minister of Spain during the Bourbon Restoration, serving in 1897, from 1900 to 1901, and from 1904 to 1905. He was the only Spanish Prime Minister of part Insulares, specifically Spanish Filipino, descent. He fought against the Spanish Revolution of 1854.

== Early life and education ==
Azcárraga was born in 1832, in Manila in the Spanish East Indies, at the island of Luzon (Luçon), to General José de Azcárraga y Ugarte, a native of Vizcaya, Spain, a bookshop owner in Escolta, Manila, and to María Palmero y Verzosa de Lizárraga, from Albay. Azcárraga was the second child and had several brothers and sisters. On his mother's side, he descended from the Spanish Filipino Lizarraga family, heirs of the fallen Conde de Lizarraga. His maternal uncles' families, collectively known as the "Palmero brothers" or "Hermanos Palmero" were active in Philippine politics before World War II. He was also an uncle to the Count of Albay, Pedro Govantes. His brother Manuel was a scholar who wrote a book on the Philippine economy.

Azcárraga studied law in the Royal University of Santo Tomas in Manila then entered the Nautical School or Escuela Náutica de Manila (today, the Philippine Merchant Marine Academy) where he was awarded the first prize in mathematics.

== Military service ==
Azcárraga was sent to Spain by his father to enter the military academy and soon earned the rank of captain in three years. Due to his services against the O'Donnell revolution in Spain, he was promoted to major.

=== Military awards ===
At the age of 23, he was awarded Spain's highest military award for gallantry the Cross of San Fernando, which is a pension grant.

=== Overseas service ===
He was sent to various overseas territories of Spain, including New Spain, the Captaincy General of Cuba, and the Captaincy General of Santo Domingo.

== Marriage ==
Afterward, he returned to Cuba and married one of the daughters of the wealthy Fesser family, owner and founder of Banco y Casa de Seguros Fesser, one of the biggest banks of Cuba, who allegedly gave him £20,000 on the day of his marriage. He was the husband of Margarita Fesser Diago, a daughter of Edward also known as Don Eduardo Fesser y Kirchnair of the United States and Micaela Diago Tato of Havana. They owned the Almacenes de Regla (Regla Warehouse) and Banco de Comercio and all the rail lines between Regla and Matanzas, then known as the Ferrocaril de la Bahia de la Habana. Almacenes de Regla, founded in 1843 with initial capital of 150,000 Cuban pesos, was so large that it stored half of all of Cuba's sugar production, and by 1853, had increased its original capital tenfold.

His children were Carlos de Azcárraga Fesser; Margarita de Azcárraga Fesser de Trenor Palavicino, the first marquesa of Turia; María de Azcárraga Fesser; the Spanish politician and military statesman José María de Azcarraga Fesser, and María del Carmen de Azcarraga Fesser. His direct descendant includes Don Tomas Trenor Puig of Valencia and Madrid, the fourth Marquis of Turia.

== As prime minister ==
In 1868, on the deposition of Queen Isabella II, he returned to Spain, hastened the restoration of the Bourbons, and became Lieutenant-General on the coronation of Alfonso XII as king. He was then elected to the Senate of Spain as a senator for life. He was the Minister of War under Antonio Cánovas del Castillo, whose assassination on 8 August 1897 effectively made him the interim Prime Minister of Spain until 4 October of that same year.

He went on to become Prime Minister of Spain twice again in two more separate incidents.

== Retirement ==
On his retirement at the age of 72, he was given the Toison de Oro, or Order of the Golden Fleece, the highest possible distinction given to a person in Spain, for his tirelessly defending the Spanish Monarchy and for keeping Spain in relative peace. Earlier, he received the Cross of San Fernando which already entitled him to a pension. Don Marcelo Azcárraga died in Madrid.

== Tribute ==
The major road stretching in the central city of Manila was named after Azcárraga. However, it was changed after Filipino independence in 1945 to Claro M. Recto Avenue, after Philippine Senator Claro M. Recto. A few of the older Manila residents still call this road "Calle Azcárraga" or "Paseo de Azcárraga".

== See also ==
- Captaincy General of the Philippines
- Chavacano
- Fort Santiago
- Gates of Intramuros
- Intramuros Grand Marian Procession
- Palmero Conspiracy
- Philippine Spanish
- Spanish East Indies
- Spanish Filipino
