= Mejorada Ministry =

The Mejorada Ministry was a Spanish government which existed between 11 July 1705 to 15 April 1714. It was headed by Pedro Fernández del Campo y Angulo, Marquis of Mejorada who was appointed by Philip V, Spain's absolute monarch.

This was a transitional time for Spain, following the establishment of a new royal dynasty and Spain's part in the Great European War of the Spanish Succession being waged over the future succession of Spain. Although Mejorda was formally the head of the government, real power was invested in Jean Orry and Marie-Anne de la Trémoille, princesse des Ursins - the royal favourites. Large chunks of Spain were under foreign occupation or refused to support Phillip's claim to the throne, to which Mejorda responded with a program of centralisation.

The Government was replaced in 1714 by the Velasco Ministry.

== Cabinet ==
11 July 1705 – 15 April 1714
Portfolio	Image	Holder	Term
Secretary of Universal Bureau (prime minister)		Marquess de Mejorada	11 July 1705 – 15 April 1714
Secretary of State for War and Treasury		José de Grimaldo	11 July 1705 – 15 April 1714
