= William Ministry =

The William Ministry (or the Ripperda Ministry) was a Spanish government which served between 12 December 1725 and 16 April 1726, headed by John William, Baron Ripperda, born a Dutchman.

The Ministry came to office following the surprise abdication of Philip V, who handed power to his eldest son Louis and political turmoil. The previous Chief Minister, José de Grimaldo, left office with him, and after some intermediaries had taken power, Ripperda was appointed to the office—which was also something of a shock as he was considered as an adventurer rather than a politician.

During his five-month tenure, much of his time was spent on foreign policy. The decision by France to break the promised engagement between the French King Louis XV and the Spanish Infanta was taken as a grave insult to Spain, and a potential weakening of her power. In response, Ripperda opened negotiations with Austria, a traditional enemy, to try to establish a new alliance, the end result of which was the Treaty of Vienna. In this, Ripperda was under heavy influence from Elisabeth Farnese, the recently abdicated king's wife and mother of the spurned child.

Following the death of the new Spanish king, Louis, after only seven months Phillip V had returned to the throne. Despite his support for Ripperda, the Chief Minister was very unpopular with ordinary Spaniards, and following a scandal concerning misappropriated money he was dismissed and forced to take refuge in the British Embassy, bringing his brief spell in the post to an inglorious end. He was later imprisoned in the Castle at Segovia. His government was replaced by the Third Grimaldo Ministry, led by the more established figure of José de Grimaldo.

== Cabinet ==
12 December 1725 – 14 April 1726
Portfolio	Image	Holder	Term
Secretary of the Universal Bureau (Prime Minister)		Duke of Ripperdá	12 December 1725 – 14 April 1726
Secretary of State for War		Duke of Ripperdá	12 December 1725 – 14 April 1726
Secretary of State for Treasury		Duke of Ripperdá	12 December 1725 – 14 April 1726
Secretary of State for Navy and Indies		Antonio de Sopeña y Mioño	12 December 1725 – 14 April 1726
Secretary of State for Ecclesiastical Affairs, Justice and Jurisdiction		José Rodrigo y Villalpando	12 December 1725 – 14 April 1726

== Sources ==
- Pearce, Edward. The Great Man: Sir Robert Walpole, Scoundrel, Genius and Britain's First Prime Minister. Pimlico, 2008.
