= Ambrosio de Funes Villalpando =

Spanish captain general of Cuba (1720–1782)

General Ambrosio Villalpando Count of Ricla

Secretary of State for War of Spain
- In office 14 January 1772 – 15 July 1780
- Monarch: Charles III
- First Secretary of State: Jerónimo Grimaldi; Count of Floridablanca
- Preceded by: Juan Gregorio Muniain
- Succeeded by: Miguel de Múzquiz y Goyeneche

Captain General of Catalonia
- In office 3 May 1767 – 7 August 1772
- Monarch: Charles III
- First Secretary of State: Jeronimo Grimaldi
- Preceded by: Bernardo O'Connor (as interim)
- Succeeded by: Bernardo O'Connor (as interim)

Viceroy of Navarre
- In office 15 October 1765 – 19 April 1768
- Monarch: Charles III
- First Secretary of State: Jeronimo Grimaldi
- Preceded by: Honorato Ignacio de Glimes de Brabante
- Succeeded by: Alonso Vicente de Solís y Folch de Cardona

Captain General of Cuba
- In office 8 July 1763 – 27 June 1765
- Monarch: Charles III
- First Secretary of State: Ricardo Wall; Jerónimo Grimaldi
- Secretary of State for Indies: Julián de Arriaga y Ribera
- Viceroy of New Spain: Joaquín de Montserrat
- Preceded by: Juan Luna
- Succeeded by: Diego Manrique

Personal details
- Born: 1720 Zaragoza, Spanish Empire
- Died: 15 July 1782 (aged 61–62) Madrid, Spanish Empire
- Relations: Count of Aranda (great-uncle)
- Parent(s): José Pedro de Alcántara Funes de Villalpando (father); María Francisca Abarca de Bolea (mother)

Military service
- Allegiance: Spain
- Branch/service: (Spain) Spanish Army
- Years of service: 1740–1780
- Rank: General
- Battles/wars: War of Austrian Succession: Siege of Villafranca; Siege of Cuneo; Battle of Plasencia; Seven Years' War: Fantastic War

Ambrosio de Funes Villalpando (1720 - 15 July 1782), was a captain general of Cuba, from July 1763 to June 1765. Prior to that, he had represented Spain at the court of the Russian Empire.

After returning to Spain, he was appointed as Viceroy of Navarre, Capitan General of Catalonia and, lastly, served Carlos III as his Secretary of War.

== Biography ==
Villalpando entered the Spanish Army, and in 1760 was appointed to represent Spain at the court of Russia. In July 1763, after Great Britain defeated France in the Seven Years' War, it also signed the Treaty of Paris with Spain, settling control of territories in North America. France ceded its territories east of the Mississippi River to Britain, and West Louisiana (and Caribbean islands) to Spain. The count of Ricla took possession of the island of Cuba in the name of the king of Spain as governor and captain general.

Villalpando served in this office until June 1765. During his short administration he improved defenses: repairing the fortifications of the city of Havana, and beginning construction of the great fortress known as La Cabaña. In addition, he improved government administration, organizing the department of finances, the police, the militia, and the hospitals. In 1764 he founded the newspaper La Gaceta de la Havana (Havana Gazette).

After his return to Spain, Villalpando was appointed as Viceroy of Navarra, and Capitain General of Catalonia. During the reign of Carlos III, Villalpando served in the cabinet as Secretary of War.

Villalpando died in Madrid on July 15, 1782, at age 62.

== Honors ==
- One of the most important streets in Havana is named Calle de Ricla in his honor.
