= Pedro Chacón y Chacón =

Spanish general

Pedro Chacón y Chacón (c. 1789 – c. 1854) was a Spanish general, most notable for participation in the First Carlist War, in which he was one of the generals fighting to defend the legitimacy of Isabella II of Spain against the Carlists in the Murcia area, where he was commander in chief.
