= Velasco Ministry =

1714 government of Spain

The Velasco Ministry was a short-lived government of Spain headed by Manuel de Vadillo y Velasco which served between 15 April 1714 and 30 November 1714 during the reign of Philip V of Spain.

Although as Secretary he could be considered Chief Minister, real power was invested in the time in the hands of royal favourites such as the Princesse des Ursins a practice that would continue intermittently for the remainder of the eighteenth century. His fall brought to power José de Grimaldo who would become the first Secretary of State to gain real power as Chief Minister, and would hold the post four times.

== Cabinet ==
15 April – 30 November 1714
Portfolio	Image	Holder	Term
Secretary of Universal Bureau (prime minister)		Manuel de Vadillo y Velasco	15 April – 30 November 1714
Secretary of State for War and Treasury		José de Grimaldo	15 April – 30 November 1714

== Bibliography ==
- Carr, Raymond. Spain: A History. Oxford, 2002.
