= Esquilache Riots =

1766 Spanish riots

- Part of Enlightenment in Spain
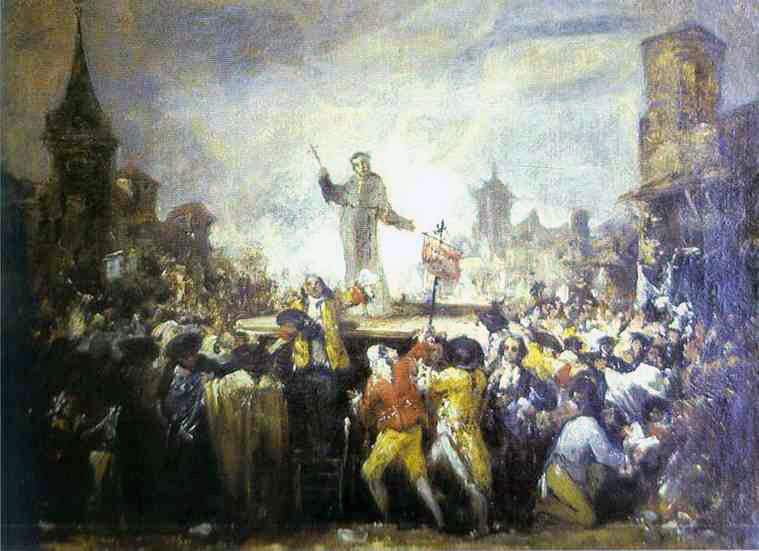
- The Esquilache Riots, by Francisco de Goya
- Date: 23–26 March 1766
- Location: Madrid
- Cause: Ministry of Leopoldo de Gregorio

The Esquilache Riots (Spanish: Motín de Esquilache) occurred in March 1766 during the rule of Charles III of Spain.

They were directly sparked by a series of measures by Leopoldo de Gregorio, Marqués de Esquilache aiming to diminish the use of traditional apparel that made it easier to conceal weapons, but they also took into account growing discontent in Madrid over the rising costs of bread and other staples.

== Background ==
Esquilache's plan was to terminate the wearing of long capes and broad-brimmed hats (chambergos) by male madrileños, replacing these traditional garments with French-style short capes and three-cornered hats. This reform was intended to modernize the appearance of conservative Spanish society and improve public safety since the ankle-length capes were supposedly thought to facilitate the concealment of weapons, while the large hats were thought to conceal a person's face; a safeguard for criminals.

The new policies did not immediately catch the attention of the populace, as more pressing issues fanned the flames of popular discontent; namely, the rising prices in bread, oil, coal, and cured meat, caused in part by Esquilache's liberalization of the grain trade. Moreover, the clothing reforms at first were only applied to the royal household and staff (January 21, 1766).

Under pain of arrest, these royal functionaries adopted the measures en masse. Esquilache then proceeded to impose the new garment requirements on the general population. The writer and government official Pedro Rodríguez de Campomanes and the Council of Castile warned him that the confiscation or enforced trimming of customary hats and cloaks would cause resentment amongst the people.

Esquilache nevertheless went ahead with these measures, and on March 10, 1766, placards appeared in Madrid prohibiting the wearing of these garments. The popular reaction was immediate: the placards were torn off the walls. Soldiers were mobilized and local authorities were attacked by the populace. Rioters shouted "Long Live Spain! Death to Esquilache!"

== Riots begin ==
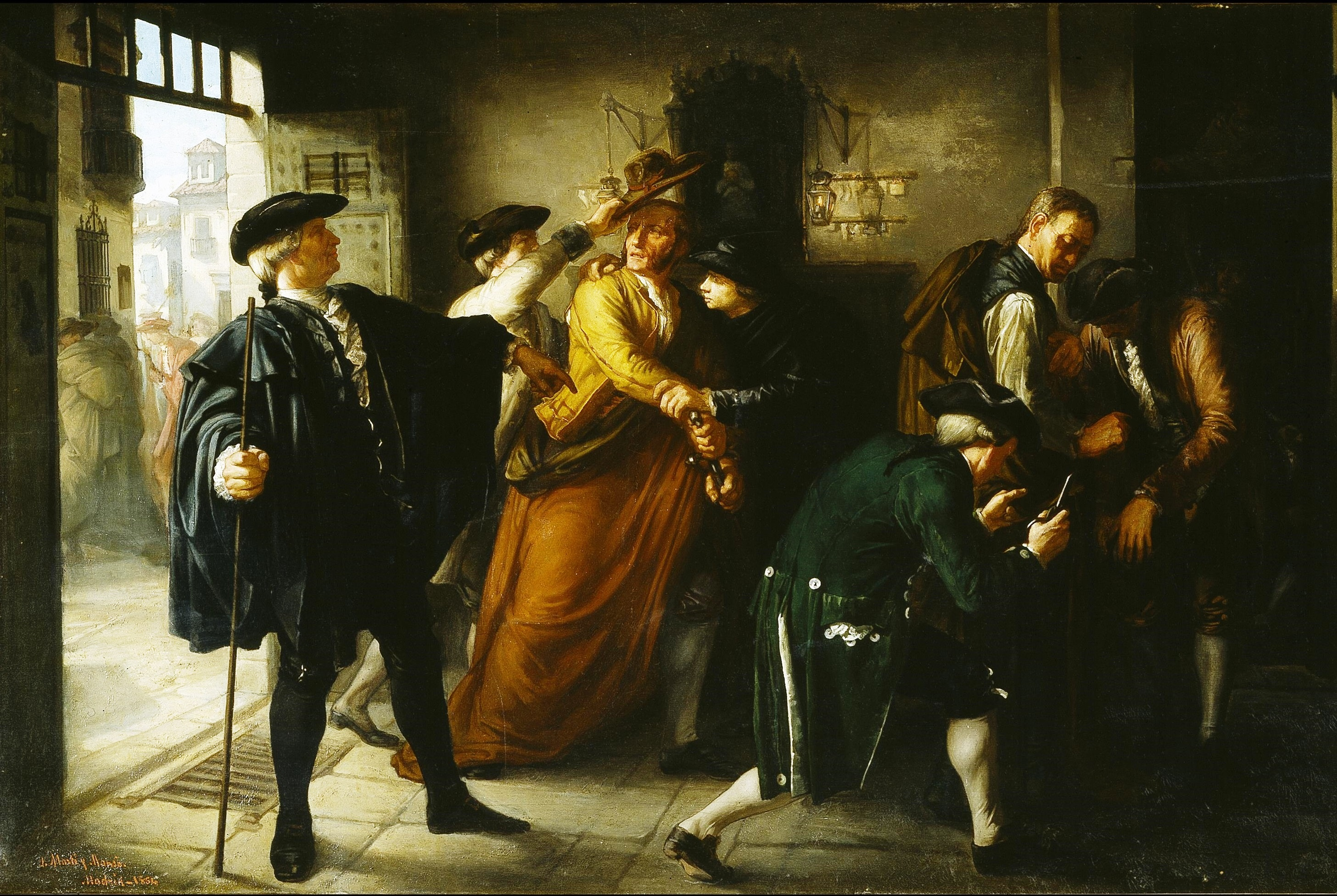
1864 painting of demonstrators being outfitted as "Hats-and-Capes"

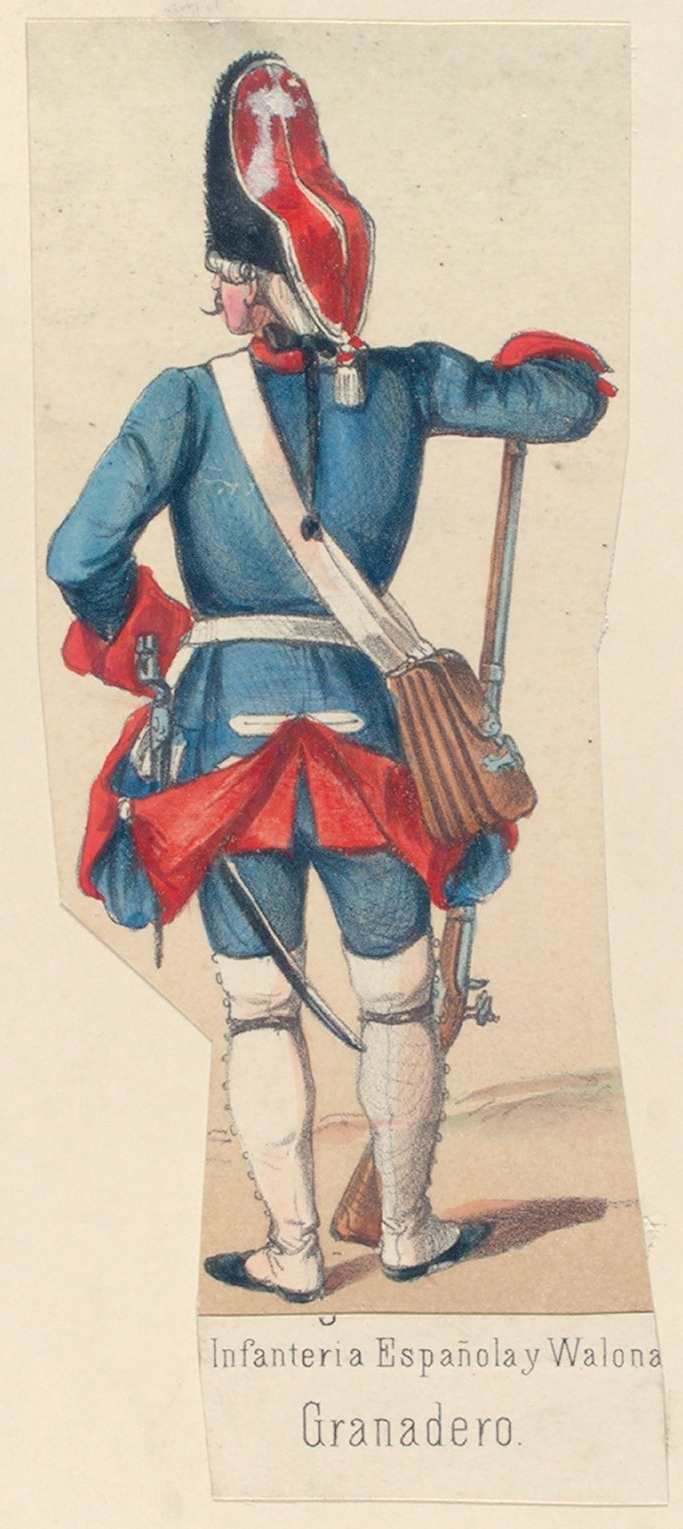
Illustration of a Walloon Guards grenadier in 1761

On Palm Sunday, around 4 o'clock in the afternoon, two townsmen, dressed in the forbidden long capes and chambergos, provocatively crossed the Plazuela de Antón Martín. Several soldiers on guard stopped them to challenge the wearing of the prohibited garments. Insults were exchanged and the soldiers tried to detain them. One of the townsmen unsheathed a sword and whistled. A band of townspeople appeared and the soldiers fled. The rioters quickly took over Plaza de los Inválidos where muskets and sabers were stored. 2,000 rioters marched on the Calle Atocha to the Plaza Mayor, shouting insults against Esquilache. They encountered Luis Antonio Fernández de Córdoba y Spínola, the 11th Duke of Medinaceli, whom they surrounded and persuaded to present petitions to the king.

The duke reported to the king, who remained calm, unaware of the seriousness of the situation. The rioters meanwhile had destroyed many of the 5,000 lampposts that had been erected throughout the city by royal order as another well-intended modernization policy. The rioters' petition had included a demand that the unpopular Walloon Guards be disbanded. This foreign regiment of the Royal Guard was recruited in the Austrian Netherlands and formed part of the permanent garrison of Madrid. A servant attached to Esquilache's household was knifed when the rioters made their way to the minister's mansion, which they sacked. They also stoned the mansion of the Grimaldi and approached the mansion of the Sabatini. That night, a portrait of Esquilache was burned in the Plaza Mayor. The king had still done nothing.

On March 24, the situation worsened. The rioters, strengthened in numbers and in confidence, marched towards where the king was residing, in the Arco de la Armería de Palacio, which was defended by Spanish troops, among them the Walloon Guards.

The Walloon Guards fired at the advancing crowd and killed a woman, increasing the number of rioters. A priest who made himself the rioters' representative managed to make his way to Charles and present him with the petitions. The priest's tone was ominous, and he promised to reduce the king's palace to rubble within two hours if the demands were not met. The rioters' demands included:

1. That the minister Esquilache and all of his family leave Spain.
2. That there only be Spanish ministers in the government.
3. That the Walloon Guards be disbanded.
4. That the price of basic goods be lowered.
5. That the Juntas de Abastos (municipal boards responsible for commodity prices and supplies) be suppressed.
6. That the troops withdraw to their respective headquarters.
7. That the use of the long cape and broad-brimmed hat be permitted.
8. That His Majesty show himself and speak from his own mouth his desire to fulfill and satisfy these demands.

The king was inclined to accept the demands, despite being counselled not do so by several of his ministers. Those ministers who believed he should accept the rioters' demands, emphasized that the riots were not a challenge against royal authority, but that they could develop into such should the demands be ignored. Charles appeared on the palace balcony. The rioters once again presented their demands. Charles calmly acceded to their demands. He and the Walloon Guards then retired into the palace.

This action temporarily calmed the populace. However, fearing for his own safety, Charles then decided to retreat to Aranjuez with the rest of his family and his ministers, including Esquilache.

A military junta took measures to restore order. The city remained calm. However, upon hearing that Charles had left secretly for Aranjuez, anger spread that the king had simply accepted the demands in order to make his subsequent escape. There were also fears that a large force of royal troops would enter Madrid and crush the revolt.

In reaction to these fears, some 30,000 people, including men, women, and children, surrounded the house of Diego Rojas Contreras, bishop of Cartagena and president of the Council of Castile. The bishop was instructed to inform the king of the popular mood and to draw up a series of demands. An emissary was sent to Aranjuez and the bishop remained trapped. Meanwhile, the townspeople had begun to sack military buildings and stores, releasing prisoners. The king replied with a letter that stated that he sincerely promised to comply with the demands of his people, and asked for calm and order.

This calmed the populace once again. Esquilache was also dismissed, a move that both Charles and Esquilache lamented. Esquilache felt that his modernizing reforms had deserved a statue, and would comment that he had cleaned and paved the city streets and had created boulevards and had nevertheless been dismissed. He was given the ambassadorship to Venice, where he subsequently died.

== Aftermath ==
Still fearing for his own safety, Charles remained at Aranjuez, leaving the government in the hands of his minister Pedro Pablo Abarca de Bolea, Count of Aranda. Doing so damaged his reputation. The king remained at Aranjuez as Aranda and troops were sent there to protect him. Aranda's arrival calmed Charles down but the king remained in the city until mid-April.

In Madrid, Aranda meanwhile had convinced the populace to adopt the French-style short capes and three-cornered hats, first meeting with the members of Madrid's five major guilds (Gremios Mayores) and 53 minor guilds (Gremios Menores). Aranda managed to convince these members that the chambergo and the long cape was nothing but the apparel of el verdugo –the hated hangman or executioner- and that no respectable person would wear such a thing. The populace thus peacefully adopted more modern apparel.

Charles III's advisers blamed the riots as a plot organized by the Jesuits. The riots thus helped seal the fate of the Jesuits, already not in favor in Charles III's court. One scholar states that "Charles III would never have dared to expel the Jesuits had he not been assured of the support of an influential party within the Spanish Church." The Spanish Crown expelled the Jesuits in January 1767 and dismantled the Jesuit missions of the Americas.

Despite the near-insurrection of the populace, Charles would continue his program of reforms. The painter Francisco de Goya, an eyewitness to these events, would paint his Motín de Esquilache around 1766–7.

== Comparisons ==
- In the 1600s, the Qing dynasty ordered all Chinese men to adopt the queue hairstyle on pain of death.
- In 1698, Czar Peter the Great commanded all of his courtiers and officials to cut off their long beards and wear European clothing.
- In 1925, Mustafa Kemal Atatürk banned the traditional local headdress, the fez, as a symbol of the former Ottoman Empire.

== See also ==
- Enlightenment Spain
- Esquilache, a 1989 Spanish film about the life of the Marques and the riot.
