= Manuel de Roda =

Spanish diplomat (1708–1782)

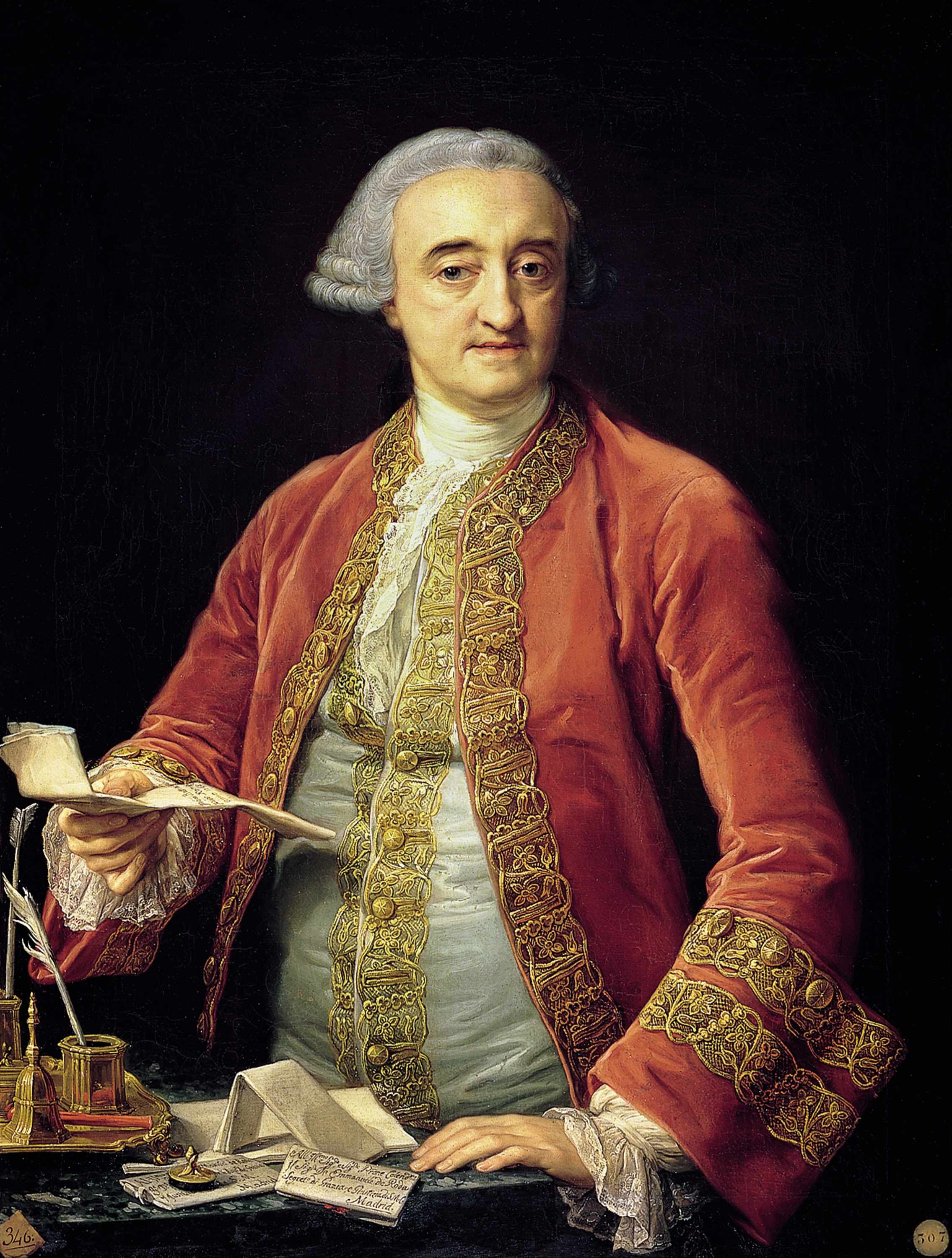
Portrait of Manuel de Roda by Pompeo Batoni (1765), Real Academia de Bellas Artes de San Fernando, Madrid

Manuel de Roda y Arrieta, 1st Marquess of Roda (5 February 1708 – 30 August 1782) was a Spanish diplomat and politician. He was Ambassador in Rome under King Ferdinand VI of Spain and then nominated by King Charles III of Spain, half-brother of Ferdinand VI and formerly King of Naples and Sicily till the death of his half-brother Ferdinand, Ministry of "Grace and Justice", which he held for 17 years.

== Biography ==
Born in Zaragoza on 5 February 1708, he participated actively in the creation of the Royal Spanish Academy of History (1735–1738).

As a Jansenist and adviser to Charles III during the reformist era that produced the Esquilache Riots attributed to Jesuit agitation, Roda was instrumental in the expulsion of the Jesuits in 1767 from Spain and Spanish overseas possessions in Europe, America and the Philippine Islands. The Portuguese expelled the Jesuits from all their domains earlier (circa 1759), under Sebastião José de Carvalho e Melo, 1st Count of Oeiras, 1st Marquis of Pombal.

The Society of Jesus as an Institution would be banned on July 21, 1773, by the Pope Clement XIV via the brief "Dominus ac Redemptor". Russia, Prussia and Poland (then absorbed by Russia) denied papal catholic authority (and Bourbon's influence) and in their kingdom forbade the promulgation of the brief ordering the Jesuits to carry on their educational activities wherever they were.

Roda died at the Royal Site of San Ildefonso, Segovia. There, he was buried at the "Christ Chapel" of this Summer Royal Palace, requesting that the King pass his title of Marquis of Roda to Miguel Joaquín Lorieri, who was married to his niece Francisca de Alpuente y Roda.
