= Leopoldo de Gregorio, 1st Marquess of Esquilache =

Sicilian-born Spanish statesman

The Most Excellent The Marquess of Esquilache OWE
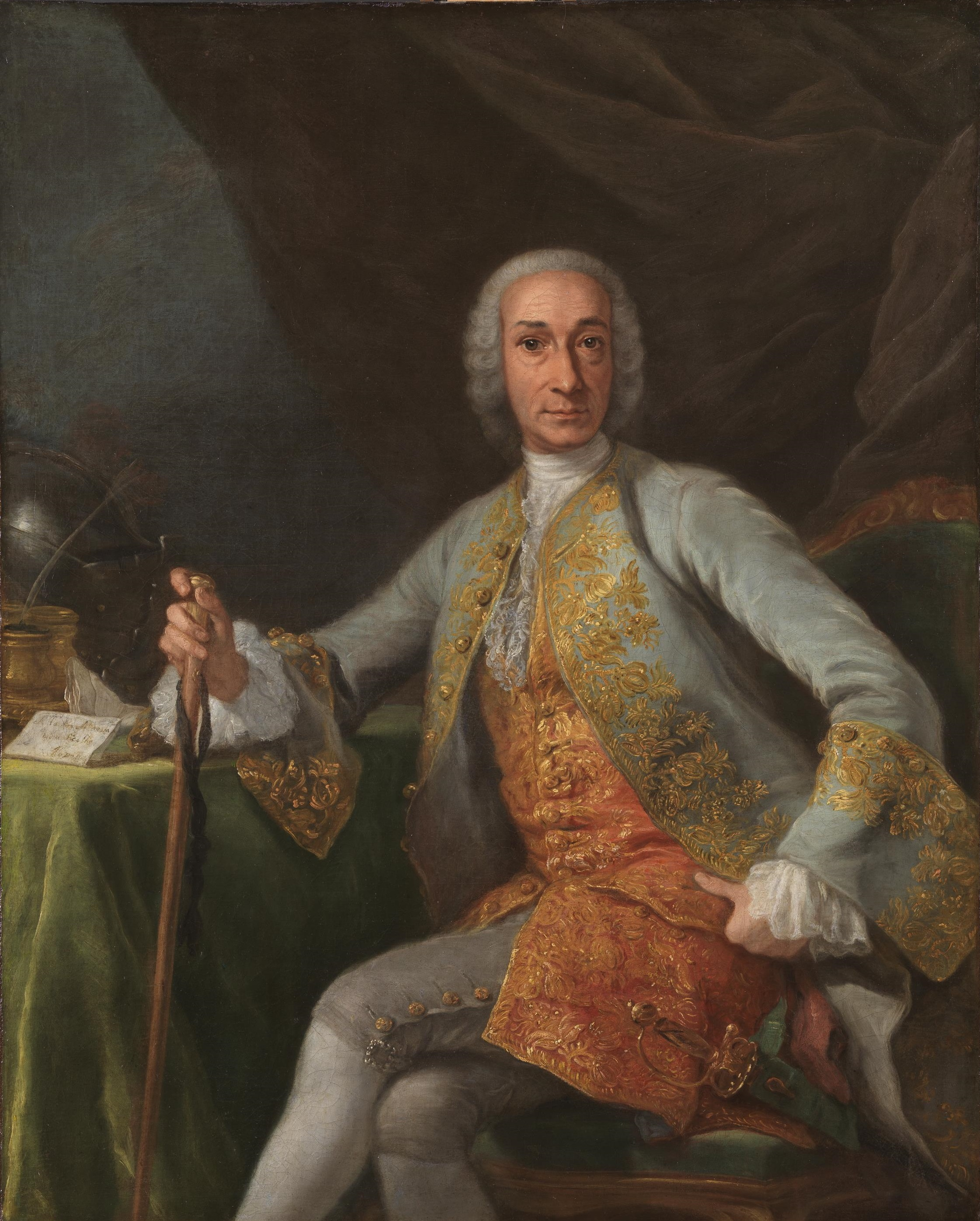
- Giuseppe Bonito: Portrait of Leopoldo de Gregorio, marchese di Squillace, Madrid, Museo del Prado.

Secretary of State of the Treasury of Spain
- In office 25 December 1759 – 1 April 1766
- Monarch: Charles III
- First Secretary of State: Ricardo Wall; Jerónimo Grimaldi
- Preceded by: Juan Francisco de Gaona y Portocarrero
- Succeeded by: Miguel de Múzquiz y Goyeneche

Secretary of State for War of Spain
- In office 1 September 1763 – 1 April 1766
- Monarch: Charles III
- First Secretary of State: Ricardo Wall; Jerónimo Grimaldi
- Preceded by: Ricardo Wall
- Succeeded by: Juan Gregorio Muniáin

Personal details
- Born: 23 December 1699 Messina, Kingdom of Sicily
- Died: 15 September 1785 (aged 85) Venice, Republic of Venice
- Spouse(s): Giuseppa Mauro, Giuseppa Verduga
- Children: 12

Leopoldo de Gregorio, 1st Marquess of Esquilache, OWE (Messina, 23 December 1699 – Venice, 15 September 1785), known in Spanish as Marqués de Esquilache and in Italian as Marchese di Squillace, was a Sicilian-born Spanish statesman who was Minister of Finance of Spain between 1759 and 1766.

== Biography ==
Born in Messina, he was the son of Francesco Maria de Gregorio and his wife Maria Orsola Masnada. De Gregorio was one of Enlightenment Spain's leading statesmen from the arrival of Charles III to the Marquis's death in 1785. His ability as a military supplier for the Neapolitan army impressed the king and raised him to royal prominence. He was created "Marquess of Squillace" in 1755.

Charles III had been introduced to reform by his mentor in Sicily, Bernardo Tanucci. Although Tanucci remained behind in the Two Sicilies to advise Charles's son, King Ferdinand I of the Two Sicilies, as the two thrones could not be united by consequence of the treaty, Charles carried with him a cadre of Italian reformers who saw potential in the Spanish bureaucracy for modernization. De Gregorio was one of them and was the architect of the first phase of Charles' reforms.

His attempt to modernize the apparel of the average Spaniard resulted in the Esquilache Riots and in his dismissal. Charles was forced to make Esquilache ambassador to Venice. It was a move that both Charles and Esquilache lamented. Esquilache felt that his measures in Spain had deserved a statue, and would comment that he had cleaned and paved the city streets and had created boulevards, and had nevertheless been dismissed.

He died in Venice.
