= List of justice ministers of Spain =

This section lists the figures within the Spanish government responsible for the proper functioning of the country's legal framework and judiciary. Likewise, the Minister of Justice is the First Notary of the Kingdom, that is, the one responsible for attesting to major State events and matters of the royal family.

The position was originally titled 'Secretary of State and of the Office of Ecclesiastical Affairs, Justice and Jurisdiction' (Spanish: Secretario de Estado y del Despacho de Negocios Eclesiásticos, Justicia y Jurisdicción). Since 1754, it was known as 'Secretary of State and of the Office of Grace and Justice', later Minister of Grace and Justice and, nowadays, simply as Minister of Justice.

== List of ministers ==
Name	Start	End	Duration	Party	Government		Ref.
Manuel Vadillo Velasco (1659–1729)	30 November 1714 (Note: Professor Ricardo Gómez-Rivero (1954–2019), in his 1988 work "The origins of the Ministry of Justice (1714–1812)" considers that he began his term on 3 November 1714, although it is a minority opinion.)	2 April 1717	2 years, 123 days	Non-partisan	The Marquess of Grimaldo (Note: From 1714 to 1715 the "strong man" at court was Jean Orry, Veedor General of Finance and, from 1715 to 1719, Giulio Alberoni, Ambassador of Parma.)	Philip V (1700–1724)	
The Marquess of Compuerta (1668–1741)	2 April 1717	6 December 1741†	24 years, 248 days	Non-partisan	The Marquess of Grimaldo	Philip V (1700–1724)	
The Marquess of Compuerta (1668–1741)	2 April 1717	6 December 1741†	24 years, 248 days	Non-partisan	The Marquess of the Peace	Louis I (1724)	
The Marquess of Compuerta (1668–1741)	2 April 1717	6 December 1741†	24 years, 248 days	Non-partisan	The Marquess of Grimaldo (Note: Between 1725 and 1726, the "strong man" at court was The Baron Ripperda, who held the position of Secretary of State and of the Office without portfolio, as a favorite.)	Philip V (1724–1746)	
The Marquess of Compuerta (1668–1741)	2 April 1717	6 December 1741†	24 years, 248 days	Non-partisan	The Marquess of the Peace	Philip V (1724–1746)	
The Marquess of Compuerta (1668–1741)	2 April 1717	6 December 1741†	24 years, 248 days	Non-partisan	José Patiño	Philip V (1724–1746)	
The Marquess of Compuerta (1668–1741)	2 April 1717	6 December 1741†	24 years, 248 days	Non-partisan	The Marquess of Villarías (Note: In practice, the "strong man" at court since 1743 was The Marquess of Ensenada, secretary of finance.)	Philip V (1724–1746)	
The Marquess of Villarías (Note: Acting until 3 January 1747.) (1687–1766)	6 December 1741	8 October 1747	5 years, 306 days	Non-partisan	The Marquess of Villarías	Philip V (1724–1746)	
The Marquess of Villarías (1687–1766)	6 December 1741	8 October 1747	5 years, 306 days	Non-partisan	José de Carvajal y Lancáster	Ferdinand VI (1746–1759)	
The Marquess of Campo de Villar (1693–1765)	8 October 1747	16 January 1765†	17 years, 100 days	Non-partisan	José de Carvajal y Lancáster	Ferdinand VI (1746–1759)	
The Marquess of Campo de Villar (1693–1765)	8 October 1747	16 January 1765†	17 years, 100 days	Non-partisan	The Duke of Alba	Ferdinand VI (1746–1759)	
The Marquess of Campo de Villar (1693–1765)	8 October 1747	16 January 1765†	17 years, 100 days	Non-partisan	Ricardo Wall	Ferdinand VI (1746–1759)	
The Marquess of Campo de Villar (1693–1765)	8 October 1747	16 January 1765†	17 years, 100 days	Non-partisan	Ricardo Wall	Charles III (1759–1788)	
The Marquess of Campo de Villar (1693–1765)	8 October 1747	16 January 1765†	17 years, 100 days	Non-partisan	The Duke of Grimaldi	Charles III (1759–1788)	
The Marquess of Roda (Note: When Roda was appointed, he was in Rome, serving as ambassador to the Holy See. The Marquess of Esquilache served as acting minister until the arrival of the minister (January – April 1765).) (1708–1782)	16 January 1765	30 August 1782†	17 years, 226 days	Non-partisan	The Duke of Grimaldi	Charles III (1759–1788)	
The Marquess of Roda (1708–1782)	16 January 1765	30 August 1782†	17 years, 226 days	Non-partisan	The Count of Floridablanca	Charles III (1759–1788)	
The Count of Floridablanca (1728–1808) acting minister	30 August 1782 (Note: It is the date of Roda's death. However, The Count of Floridablanca began serving as acting minister days before his predecessor's death.)	25 April 1790	7 years, 238 days	Non-partisan	The Count of Floridablanca	Charles III (1759–1788)	
The Count of Floridablanca (1728–1808) acting minister	30 August 1782	25 April 1790	7 years, 238 days	Non-partisan	The Count of Floridablanca	Charles IV (1788–1808)	
The Marquess of Bajamar (1722–1813)	25 April 1790	10 July 1792 (Note: The Marquess of Bajamar was dismissed on July 10, although he remained in office on an interim basis until July 27. Acuña was appointed on July 13, although he began receiving his salary retroactively to July 10.)	2 years, 76 days	Non-partisan	The Count of Floridablanca	Charles IV (1788–1808)	
The Marquess of Bajamar (1722–1813)	25 April 1790	10 July 1792	2 years, 76 days	Non-partisan	The Count of Aranda (Note: Although he worked with some independence, by this time Manuel Godoy, Prince of the Peace, already controlled the court.)	Charles IV (1788–1808)	
Pedro Antonio Acuña y Malvar (1755–1813)	10 July 1792	22 January 1794	1 year, 196 days	Non-partisan	The Count of Aranda	Charles IV (1788–1808)	
Pedro Antonio Acuña y Malvar (1755–1813)	10 July 1792	22 January 1794	1 year, 196 days	Non-partisan	The Prince of the Peace	Charles IV (1788–1808)	
Eugenio de Llaguno y Amírola (1724–1799)	22 January 1794	10 November 1797	3 years, 292 days	Non-partisan	The Prince of the Peace	Charles IV (1788–1808)	
Gaspar Melchor de Jovellanos (1744–1811)	10 November 1797	16 August 1798	279 days	Non-partisan	The Prince of the Peace	Charles IV (1788–1808)	
Gaspar Melchor de Jovellanos (1744–1811)	10 November 1797	16 August 1798	279 days	Non-partisan	Francisco de Saavedra (Note: He did not have an effective government. It was heavily influenced by his predecessor, and his ongoing health problems prevented him from exercise the office.)	Charles IV (1788–1808)	
The Marquess of Caballero (Note: Miguel Cayetano Soler, Minister of Finance, served as acting minister from 2 July 1805 until 1807 or 1808, depending on the source. The Marquess of Caballero was formally dismissed on 5 April 1808.) (1754–1821)	16 August 1798	5 April 1808	9 years, 233 days	Non-partisan	Francisco de Saavedra	Charles IV (1788–1808)	
The Marquess of Caballero (1754–1821)	16 August 1798	5 April 1808	9 years, 233 days	Non-partisan	Mariano Luis de Urquijo	Charles IV (1788–1808)	
The Marquess of Caballero (1754–1821)	16 August 1798	5 April 1808	9 years, 233 days	Non-partisan	Pedro Cevallos (Note: In practice, the government was run by Manuel Godoy.)	Charles IV (1788–1808)	
The Marquess of Caballero (1754–1821)	16 August 1798	5 April 1808	9 years, 233 days	Non-partisan	Pedro Cevallos	Ferdinand VII (1808–1833)	
Sebastián Piñuela Alonso (1737–1812)	5 April 1808	7 July 1808	93 days	Non-partisan	Pedro Cevallos	Ferdinand VII (1808–1833)	
Reign of Joseph Bonaparte
Sebastián Piñuela Alonso (1737–1812)	7 July 1808	1 August 1808	25 days	Non-partisan	Mariano Luis de Urquijo	Joseph Bonaparte (1808–1813)	
Manuel Romero Echalecu (Note: Acting until 21 December 1808.) (1739–1812)	5 September 1808	27 February 1812	3 years, 175 days	Non-partisan	Mariano Luis de Urquijo	Joseph Bonaparte (1808–1813)	
Pedro Antonio Arribas (1771–1828) acting minister	27 February 1812	27 June 1813	1 year, 120 days	Non-partisan	Mariano Luis de Urquijo	Joseph Bonaparte (1808–1813)	
Supreme Central Junta — Regency in the name of Ferdinand VII; Abdication of Ferdinand VII declared null and void by the Council of Castile on August 11, 1808 and recognition of him as king on August 24 of the same year.
Benito Ramón Hermida Maldonado (1736–1814)	15 October 1808	6 February 1810	1 year, 114 days	Non-partisan	Pedro Cevallos	Ferdinand VII (1808–1833)	
Benito Ramón Hermida Maldonado (1736–1814)	15 October 1808	6 February 1810	1 year, 114 days	Non-partisan	Martín de Garay	Ferdinand VII (1808–1833)	
Benito Ramón Hermida Maldonado (1736–1814)	15 October 1808	6 February 1810	1 year, 114 days	Non-partisan	Pedro de Rivero	Ferdinand VII (1808–1833)	
Benito Ramón Hermida Maldonado (1736–1814)	15 October 1808	6 February 1810	1 year, 114 days	Non-partisan	Francisco de Saavedra	Ferdinand VII (1808–1833)	
Benito Ramón Hermida Maldonado (1736–1814)	15 October 1808	6 February 1810	1 year, 114 days	Non-partisan	The Marquess of Hormazas	Ferdinand VII (1808–1833)	
Nicolás María Sierra (1750–1817)	6 March 1810	19 January 1811 (Note: Professor Ricardo Gómez-Rivero (1954–2019), in his 1988 work "The origins of the Ministry of Justice (1714–1812)" estimates that Sierra's resignation was accepted on January 22, although he himself states that Larrumbide was appointed as acting minister 3 days earlier. Professor José Ramón Urquijo Goitiain in his Diccionario Biográfico de los Ministeros Españoles en la Edad Contemporánea uses January 19 as the date of dismissal.)	319 days	Non-partisan	The Marquess of Hormazas	Ferdinand VII (1808–1833)	
Nicolás María Sierra (1750–1817)	6 March 1810	19 January 1811	319 days	Non-partisan	Eusebio Bardají y Azara	Ferdinand VII (1808–1833)	
José Antonio Larrumbide Urquidizar (1756–1827) acting minister	19 January 1811	12 August 1811	205 days	Non-partisan	Eusebio Bardají y Azara	Ferdinand VII (1808–1833)	
Ignacio de la Pezuela (1764–1850) acting minister	12 August 1811	23 June 1812	316 days	Non-partisan	Eusebio Bardají y Azara	Ferdinand VII (1808–1833)	
Ignacio de la Pezuela (1764–1850) acting minister	12 August 1811	23 June 1812	316 days	Non-partisan	José García de León y Pizarro	Ferdinand VII (1808–1833)	
Ignacio de la Pezuela (1764–1850) acting minister	12 August 1811	23 June 1812	316 days	Non-partisan	Ignacio de la Pezuela	Ferdinand VII (1808–1833)	
Antonio Cano Ramírez de Arellano (1768–1836)	23 June 1812	10 October 1813	1 year, 109 days	Non-partisan	The Marquess of Casa Irujo	Ferdinand VII (1808–1833)	
Antonio Cano Ramírez de Arellano (1768–1836)	23 June 1812	10 October 1813	1 year, 109 days	Non-partisan	The Marquess of Labrador	Ferdinand VII (1808–1833)	
Antonio Cano Ramírez de Arellano (1768–1836)	23 June 1812	10 October 1813	1 year, 109 days	Non-partisan	Antonio Cano Ramírez de Arellano	Ferdinand VII (1808–1833)	
Manuel García Herreros (1767–1836) acting minister	10 October 1813	4 May 1814	206 days	Non-partisan	Juan O'Donojú	Ferdinand VII (1808–1833)	
Manuel García Herreros (1767–1836) acting minister	10 October 1813	4 May 1814	206 days	Non-partisan	José Luyando	Ferdinand VII (1808–1833)	
Abolition of the Constitution of 1812
Pedro Macanaz (1764–1830)	4 May 1814	8 November 1814	188 days	Non-partisan	The Duke of San Carlos	Ferdinand VII (1808–1833)	
Tomás Moyano (Note: Acting until 27 January 1815.) (1760–1830)	8 November 1814	27 January 1816	1 year, 80 days	Non-partisan	The Duke of San Carlos	Ferdinand VII (1808–1833)	
Tomás Moyano (1760–1830)	8 November 1814	27 January 1816	1 year, 80 days	Non-partisan	Pedro Cevallos	Ferdinand VII (1808–1833)	
Pedro Cevallos (1759–1838) acting minister	27 January 1816	30 October 1816	277 days	Non-partisan	Pedro Cevallos	Ferdinand VII (1808–1833)	
José García de León y Pizarro (1770–1835) acting minister	30 October 1816	29 January 1817	91 days	Non-partisan	José García de León y Pizarro	Ferdinand VII (1808–1833)	
The Marquess of Casa Lozano (1779–1831)	29 January 1817	1 November 1819	2 years, 276 days	Non-partisan	José García de León y Pizarro	Ferdinand VII (1808–1833)	
The Marquess of Casa Lozano (1779–1831)	29 January 1817	1 November 1819	2 years, 276 days	Non-partisan	The Marquess of Casa Irujo	Ferdinand VII (1808–1833)	
The Marquess of Casa Lozano (1779–1831)	29 January 1817	1 November 1819	2 years, 276 days	Non-partisan	Manuel González Salmón	Ferdinand VII (1808–1833)	
The Marquess of Casa Lozano (1779–1831)	29 January 1817	1 November 1819	2 years, 276 days	Non-partisan	The Duke of San Fernando de Quiroga	Ferdinand VII (1808–1833)	
The Marquess of Mataflorida (1762–1832)	1 November 1819	9 March 1820	129 days	Non-partisan	The Duke of San Fernando de Quiroga	Ferdinand VII (1808–1833)	
José García de la Torre (1774–1847) acting minister	9 March 2020	8 April 1820	30 days	Non-partisan	The Duke of San Fernando de Quiroga	Ferdinand VII (1808–1833)	
José García de la Torre (1774–1847) acting minister	9 March 2020	8 April 1820	30 days	Non-partisan	Evaristo Pérez de Castro	Ferdinand VII (1808–1833)	
Manuel García Herreros (1767–1836)	8 April 1820	2 March 1821	328 days	Non-partisan	Evaristo Pérez de Castro	Ferdinand VII (1808–1833)	
Manuel Encima y Piedra acting minister	2 March 1821	4 March 1821	2 days	Non-partisan	Joaquín Anduaga Cuenca	Ferdinand VII (1808–1833)	
Antonio Cano Ramírez de Arellano (1774–1838)	4 March 1821	28 February 1822	241 days	Non-partisan	Eusebio Bardají y Azara	Ferdinand VII (1808–1833)	
Antonio Cano Ramírez de Arellano (1774–1838)	4 March 1821	28 February 1822	241 days	Non-partisan	Ramón López-Pelegrín	Ferdinand VII (1808–1833)	
Antonio Cano Ramírez de Arellano (1774–1838)	4 March 1821	28 February 1822	241 days	Non-partisan	The Marquess of Santa Cruz	Ferdinand VII (1808–1833)	
Antonio Cano Ramírez de Arellano (1774–1838)	4 March 1821	28 February 1822	241 days	Non-partisan	Ramón López-Pelegrín	Ferdinand VII (1808–1833)	
Nicolás María Garelli (1777–1850)	28 February 1822	23 July 1822	145 days	Non-partisan	Francisco Martínez de la Rosa	Ferdinand VII (1808–1833)	
Damián de la Santa (1769–1835) acting minister	23 July 1822	5 August 1822	13 days	Non-partisan	Francisco Martínez de la Rosa	Ferdinand VII (1808–1833)	
Felipe Benicio Navarro Aliguer (1774–1832)	5 August 1822	12 May 1823	280 days	Non-partisan	The Duke of San Miguel	Ferdinand VII (1808–1833)	
Felipe Benicio Navarro Aliguer (1774–1832)	5 August 1822	12 May 1823	280 days	Non-partisan	José Manuel de Vadillo	Ferdinand VII (1808–1833)	
Felipe Benicio Navarro Aliguer (1774–1832)	5 August 1822	12 May 1823	280 days	Non-partisan	Santiago Usoz y Mozi	Ferdinand VII (1808–1833)	
José María Calatrava (1781–1846)	12 May 1823	30 September 1823	141 days	Non-partisan	José María Pando	Ferdinand VII (1808–1833)	
José María Calatrava (1781–1846)	12 May 1823	30 September 1823	141 days	Non-partisan	Juan Antonio Yandiola Garay	Ferdinand VII (1808–1833)	
José María Calatrava (1781–1846)	12 May 1823	30 September 1823	141 days	Non-partisan	José Luyando	Ferdinand VII (1808–1833)	
José García de la Torre (Note: Acting during the absence of the minister: José Aznárez Navarro, Minister of the Interior (19 August – 1 October 1823).) (1774–1847)	30 September 1823	2 December 1823	63 days	Non-partisan	Víctor Damián Sáez (Note: Antonio Vargas Laguna, 1st Marquess of the Constancia, was the de iure prime minister until August 7, 1823, but he was abroad negotiating with foreign powers, so he never took office.)	Ferdinand VII (1808–1833)	
The Marquess of Heredia (1775–1847)	2 December 1823	18 January 1824	47 days	Non-partisan	The Marquess of Casa Irujo	Ferdinand VII (1808–1833)	
The Duke of Santa Isabel (1773–1842)	18 January 1824	1 October 1832	8 years, 257 days	Non-partisan	The Marquess of Heredia	Ferdinand VII (1808–1833)	
The Duke of Santa Isabel (1773–1842)	18 January 1824	1 October 1832	8 years, 257 days	Non-partisan	Francisco Cea Bermúdez	Ferdinand VII (1808–1833)	
The Duke of Santa Isabel (1773–1842)	18 January 1824	1 October 1832	8 years, 257 days	Non-partisan	The Duke of the Infantado	Ferdinand VII (1808–1833)	
The Duke of Santa Isabel (1773–1842)	18 January 1824	1 October 1832	8 years, 257 days	Non-partisan	Manuel González Salmón	Ferdinand VII (1808–1833)	
The Duke of Santa Isabel (1773–1842)	18 January 1824	1 October 1832	8 years, 257 days	Non-partisan	The Count of Alcudia	Ferdinand VII (1808–1833)	
José Cafranga Costilla (1780–1854)	1 October 1832	14 December 1832	74 days	Non-partisan	Francisco Cea Bermúdez	Ferdinand VII (1808–1833)	
The Count of Pinofiel (1768–1843)	14 December 1832	25 March 1833	101 days	Non-partisan	Francisco Cea Bermúdez	Ferdinand VII (1808–1833)	
Juan Gualberto González Bravo (1777–1857)	25 March 1833	15 January 1834	296 days	Non-partisan	Francisco Cea Bermúdez	Ferdinand VII (1808–1833)	
Juan Gualberto González Bravo (1777–1857)	25 March 1833	15 January 1834	296 days	Non-partisan	Francisco Cea Bermúdez	Isabella II (1833–1868)	
Nicolás María Garelli (1777–1850)	15 January 1834	17 February 1835	1 year, 33 days	Moderate	Francisco Martínez de la Rosa	Isabella II (1833–1868)	
Juan de la Dehesa (1779–1839)	19 February 1835	13 June 1835	114 days	Moderate	Francisco Martínez de la Rosa	Isabella II (1833–1868)	
Juan de la Dehesa (1779–1839)	19 February 1835	13 June 1835	114 days	Moderate	The Count of Toreno	Isabella II (1833–1868)	
Manuel García Herreros (1767–1836)	13 June 1835	27 September 1835	106 days	Progressive	The Count of Toreno	Isabella II (1833–1868)	
Manuel García Herreros (1767–1836)	13 June 1835	27 September 1835	106 days	Progressive	Miguel Ricardo de Álava (Note: Acting during the absences of the Minister: Julián Villalba (14–17 September 1835) and Juan Álvarez Mendizábal (17–25 September).)	Isabella II (1833–1868)	
Joaquín Díaz Caneja (1777–1851) acting minister	27 September 1835	28 September 1835	1 day	Progressive	Juan Álvarez Mendizábal (acting)	Isabella II (1833–1868)	
Álvaro Gómez Becerra (1771–1855)	28 September 1835	15 May 1836	230 days	Progressive	Juan Álvarez Mendizábal (acting)	Isabella II (1833–1868)	
Manuel Barrio Ayuso (1786–1850)	15 May 1836	14 August 1836	91 days	Moderate	Francisco Javier de Istúriz (acting)	Isabella II (1833–1868)	
José Landero y Corchado (Note: Acting until 11 September 1836.) (1784–1848)	14 August 1836	18 August 1837	1 year, 4 days	Progressive	José María Calatrava	Isabella II (1833–1868)	
Ramón Salvato de Esteve (1782–1839)	18 August 1837	1 October 1837	44 days	Progressive	The Prince of Vergara	Isabella II (1833–1868)	
Juan Antonio Castejón (1785–1858)	1 October 1837	4 October 1837	3 days	Progressive	The Prince of Vergara	Isabella II (1833–1868)	
Pablo Mata Vigil (1785–1852)	4 October 1837	16 December 1837	73 days	Progressive	The Prince of Vergara	Isabella II (1833–1868)	
Pablo Mata Vigil (1785–1852)	4 October 1837	16 December 1837	73 days	Progressive	Eusebio Bardají y Azara	Isabella II (1833–1868)	
The Marquess of Gerona (1809–1847)	16 December 1837	6 September 1838	264 days	Moderate	The Marquess of Heredia	Isabella II (1833–1868)	
Domingo Ruiz de la Vega (1789–1871)	6 September 1838	21 November 1838	76 days	Moderate	The Duke of Frías	Isabella II (1833–1868)	
The Marquess of Valdeterrazo (1792–1876)	6 December 1838	9 December 1838	3 days	Progressive	The Duke of Frías	Isabella II (1833–1868)	
Lorenzo Arrazola y García (1795–1873)	9 December 1838	20 July 1840	1 year, 224 days	Moderate	Evaristo Pérez de Castro	Isabella II (1833–1868)	
The Marquess of Valdeterrazo (Note: He never assumed office. Ramón de Santillán, Acting Minister of Finance, was appointed Acting Minister in 20 July 1840, waiting for the incumbent to take office, which did not happen. When Silvela was appointed in August 12, Santillán continued in an interim capacity until August 19, when José María Secades, Director-General for Provincial Taxes, was appointed Acting Minister.) (1792–1876)	20 July 1840	12 August 1840	23 days	Progressive	The Marquess of Valdeterrazo	Isabella II (1833–1868)	
Francisco Agustín Silvela y Blanco (1803–1857)	12 August 1840	29 August 1840	17 days	Progressive	Valentín Ferraz y Barrau	Isabella II (1833–1868)	
Modesto Cortázar y Leal de Ibarra (1783–1862)	29 August 1840	11 September 1840	13 days	Progressive	Modesto Cortázar y Leal de Ibarra	Isabella II (1833–1868)	
Álvaro Gómez Becerra (1771–1855)	11 September 1840	20 May 1841	251 days	Progressive	Vicente Sancho y Cobertores	Isabella II (1833–1868)	
Álvaro Gómez Becerra (1771–1855)	11 September 1840	20 May 1841	251 days	Progressive	The Prince of Vergara	Isabella II (1833–1868)	
Álvaro Gómez Becerra (1771–1855)	11 September 1840	20 May 1841	251 days	Progressive	Joaquín María Ferrer y Cafranga	Isabella II (1833–1868)	
José Alonso Ruiz de Conejares (1781–1855)	21 May 1841	17 June 1842	1 year, 27 days	Progressive	The Marquess of Valdeterrazo	Isabella II (1833–1868)	
Miguel Antonio Zumalacárregui (1773–1846)	17 June 1842	9 May 1843	326 days	Progressive	The Marquess of Rodil	Isabella II (1833–1868)	
Joaquín María López y López (1798–1855)	9 May 1843	19 May 1843	10 days	Progressive	Joaquín María López y López	Isabella II (1833–1868)	
Álvaro Gómez Becerra (1771–1855)	19 May 1843	23 July 1843	65 days	Progressive	Álvaro Gómez Becerra	Isabella II (1833–1868)	
Joaquín María López y López (1798–1855)	24 July 1843	24 November 1843	120 days	Progressive	Joaquín María López	Isabella II (1833–1868)	
Joaquín María López y López (1798–1855)	24 July 1843	24 November 1843	120 days	Progressive	Salustiano de Olózaga y Almandoz	Isabella II (1833–1868)	
Claudio Antón de Luzuriaga (1810–1874)	24 November 1843	1 December 1843	7 days	Progressive	Salustiano de Olózaga y Almandoz	Isabella II (1833–1868)	
Luis González Bravo (1811–1871) acting minister	1 December 1843	5 December 1843	4 days	Moderate	Salustiano de Olózaga y Almandoz	Isabella II (1833–1868)	
Luis Mayans y Enríquez de Navarra (1805–1880)	5 December 1843	12 February 1846	2 years, 69 days	Moderate	Luis González Bravo	Isabella II (1833–1868)	
Luis Mayans y Enríquez de Navarra (1805–1880)	5 December 1843	12 February 1846	2 years, 69 days	Moderate	The Duke of Valencia	Isabella II (1833–1868)	
Manuel Ortiz de Zúñiga Montemayor (1806–1873) acting minister	12 February 1846	13 February 1846	1 day	Moderate	The Marquess of Miraflores	Isabella II (1833–1868)	
Lorenzo Arrazola y García (1795–1873)	13 February 1846	16 March 1846	31 days	Moderate	The Marquess of Miraflores	Isabella II (1833–1868)	
Pedro de Egaña (1803–1885)	16 March 1846	12 April 1846	27 days	Moderate	The Duke of Valencia	Isabella II (1833–1868)	
Pedro de Egaña (1803–1885)	16 March 1846	12 April 1846	27 days	Moderate	Francisco Javier de Istúriz	Isabella II (1833–1868)	
Joaquín Díaz Caneja (1777–1851)	12 April 1846	28 January 1847	291 days	Moderate	Francisco Javier de Istúriz	Isabella II (1833–1868)	
Juan Bravo Murillo (1803–1873)	28 January 1847	28 March 1847	59 days	Moderate	The Marquess of Casa Irujo	Isabella II (1833–1868)	
Antonio de Benavides y Fernández de Navarrete (1807–1884) acting minister	28 March 1847	30 March 1847	2 days	Moderate	Joaquín Francisco Pacheco	Isabella II (1833–1868)	
Florencio Rodríguez Vaamonde (1807–1886)	30 March 1847	3 September 1847	157 days	Moderate	Joaquín Francisco Pacheco	Isabella II (1833–1868)	
Florencio Rodríguez Vaamonde (1807–1886)	30 March 1847	3 September 1847	157 days	Moderate	Florencio García Goyena	Isabella II (1833–1868)	
Florencio García Goyena (1783–1855)	3 September 1847	4 October 1847	31 days	Moderate	Florencio García Goyena	Isabella II (1833–1868)	
Lorenzo Arrazola y García (1795–1873)	4 October 1847	19 October 1849	2 years, 15 days	Moderate	The Duke of Valencia	Isabella II (1833–1868)	
José María Manresa Sánchez (1810–1883)	19 October 1849	20 October 1849	1 day	Moderate	The Count of Clonard	Isabella II (1833–1868)	
Lorenzo Arrazola y García (1795–1873)	20 October 1849	14 January 1851	1 year, 86 days	Moderate	The Duke of Valencia	Isabella II (1833–1868)	
Ventura González Romero (Note: During the absence of the minister: Juan Bravo Murillo, Prime Minister (28 July to 3 September 1851).) (1796–1870)	14 January 1851	14 December 1852	1 year, 335 days	Moderate	Juan Bravo Murillo	Isabella II (1833–1868)	
Federico Vahey Alba (1807–1856)	14 December 1852	9 April 1853	116 days	Moderate	The Count of Alcoy	Isabella II (1833–1868)	
Alejandro Llorente y Lannas (1814–1901) acting minister	9 April 1853	14 April 1853	5 days	Moderate	The Count of Alcoy	Isabella II (1833–1868)	
Pablo Govantes Fernández de Angulo (1785–1865)	14 April 1853	19 September 1853	158 days	Moderate	Francisco de Lersundi y Hormaechea	Isabella II (1833–1868)	
The Marquess of Gerona (1808–1869)	19 September 1853	16 January 1854	119 days	Moderate	The Count of San Luis	Isabella II (1833–1868)	
Jacinto Félix Domenech (1802–1863) acting minister	16 January 1854	17 July 1854	182 days	Progressive	The Count of San Luis	Isabella II (1833–1868)	
Pedro Gómez de la Serna (1806–1871)	18 July 1854	30 July 1854	12 days	Progressive	The Marquess of Mendigorría	Isabella II (1833–1868)	
Pedro Gómez de la Serna (1806–1871)	18 July 1854	30 July 1854	12 days	Progressive	The Duke of Rivas	Isabella II (1833–1868)	
Pedro Gómez de la Serna (1806–1871)	18 July 1854	30 July 1854	12 days	Progressive	The Prince of Vergara	Isabella II (1833–1868)	
José Alonso Ruiz de Conejares (Note: During the absence of the minister: Joaquín Francisco Pacheco, Minister of State, Acting Minister of the Governance (30 July to 7 August 1854).) (1781–1855)	30 July 1854	29 November 1854	122 days	Progressive	The Prince of Vergara	Isabella II (1833–1868)	
Joaquín Aguirre de la Peña (1807–1869)	29 November 1854	6 June 1855	189 days	Progressive	The Prince of Vergara	Isabella II (1833–1868)	
Manuel de la Fuente Andrés (1808–1867)	6 June 1855	15 January 1856	223 days	Progressive	The Prince of Vergara	Isabella II (1833–1868)	
José Arias Uría (1799–1873)	15 January 1856	14 July 1856	181 days	Progressive	The Prince of Vergara	Isabella II (1833–1868)	
Claudio Antón de Luzuriaga (Note: He never took office due to illness. Antonio de los Ríos Rosas, Minister of the Governance, served as acting minister during this time.) (1810–1874)	14 July 1856	7 August 1856	24 days	Progressive	The Duke of Tetuán	Isabella II (1833–1868)	
Cirilo Álvarez (1807–1878)	7 August 1856	12 October 1856	66 days	Independent	The Duke of Tetuán	Isabella II (1833–1868)	
Manuel Seijas Lozano (Note: During the absence of the minister: The Marquess of Pidal (23 July to 23 August 1857).) (1800–1868)	12 October 1856	15 October 1857	1 year, 3 days	Moderate	The Duke of Valencia	Isabella II (1833–1868)	
Fernando Álvarez Martínez (1814–1883) acting minister	15 October 1857	25 October 1857	10 days	Moderate	The Marquess of Nervión	Isabella II (1833–1868)	
Joaquín José Casaus (1793–1885)	25 October 1857	14 January 1858	81 days	Moderate	The Marquess of Nervión	Isabella II (1833–1868)	
Francisco Javier de Istúriz (1785–1871)	14 January 1858	30 June 1858	167 days	Moderate	Francisco Javier de Istúriz	Isabella II (1833–1868)	
Santiago Fernández Negrete (Note: During the absences of the minister: José Posada Herrera, Minister of the Governance (10–29 August 1859 and 13 August to 30 October 1862) and Rafael de Bustos y Castilla, Marquess of Corvera, Minister of Development (14 July to 2 August 1860).) (1799–1869)	30 June 1858	17 January 1863	4 years, 201 days	Liberal Unionist	The Duke of Tetuán	Isabella II (1833–1868)	
Nicomedes Pastor Díaz y Corbelle (1811–1863)	17 January 1863	9 February 1863	23 days	Liberal Unionist	The Duke of Tetuán	Isabella II (1833–1868)	
Pedro Nolasco Aurioles (1818–1884)	9 February 1863	2 March 1863	21 days	Liberal Unionist	The Duke of Tetuán	Isabella II (1833–1868)	
Rafael Monares Cebrián (1811–1877)	3 March 1863	17 January 1864	320 days	Moderate	The Marquess of Miraflores	Isabella II (1833–1868)	
Fernando Álvarez Martínez (1814–1883)	17 January 1864	1 March 1864	44 days	Moderate	Lorenzo Arrazola y García	Isabella II (1833–1868)	
Luis Mayans y Enríquez de Navarra (Note: During the absences of the minister: Alejandro Mon y Menéndez, Prime Minister (14–25 June 1864 and 3–11 July 1864).) (1805–1880)	1 March 1864	16 September 1864	199 days	Moderate	Alejandro Mon y Menéndez	Isabella II (1833–1868)	
Lorenzo Arrazola y García (1795–1873)	16 September 1864	21 June 1865	278 days	Moderate	The Duke of Valencia	Isabella II (1833–1868)	
The Marquess of Reinosa (1811–1890)	21 June 1865	10 July 1866	1 year, 19 days	Independent	The Duke of Tetuán	Isabella II (1833–1868)	
Lorenzo Arrazola y García (1795–1873)	10 July 1866	27 June 1867	352 days	Moderate	The Duke of Valencia†	Isabella II (1833–1868)	
The Marquess of Roncali (1811–1875)	27 June 1867	15 June 1868	126 days	Moderate	The Duke of Valencia†	Isabella II (1833–1868)	
The Marquess of Roncali (1811–1875)	27 June 1867	15 June 1868	126 days	Moderate	Luis González Bravo	Isabella II (1833–1868)	
Carlos María Coronado (1814–?)	15 June 1868	20 September 1868	97 days	Moderate	Luis González Bravo	Isabella II (1833–1868)	
Carlos María Coronado (1814–?)	15 June 1868	20 September 1868	97 days	Moderate	The Marquess of Havana	Isabella II (1833–1868)	
Vicente Gomis y Sierra (?–1880) acting minister	20 September 1868	8 October 1868	18 days	Independent	The Marquess of Havana	Isabella II (1833–1868)	
Antonio Romero Ortiz (1822–1884)	8 October 1868	18 June 1869	253 days	Liberal Unionist	The Duke of the Tower	The Duke of the Tower (regent) (1869–1871)	
Cristóbal Martín de Herrera (1831–1878)	18 June 1869	13 July 1869	136 days	Liberal Unionist	The Marquess of Castillejos	The Duke of the Tower (regent) (1869–1871)	
Manuel Ruiz Zorrilla (1833–1895)	13 July 1869	9 January 1870	1 year, 31 days	Progressive	The Marquess of Castillejos	The Duke of the Tower (regent) (1869–1871)	
Manuel Ruiz Zorrilla (1833–1895)	13 July 1869	9 January 1870	1 year, 31 days	Progressive	Juan Bautista Topete	The Duke of the Tower (regent) (1869–1871)	
Eugenio Montero Ríos (1832–1914)	9 January 1870	4 January 1871	220 days	Progressive	Juan Bautista Topete	Amadeo I (1871–1873)	
Augusto Ulloa y Castañón (1823–1879)	4 January 1871	24 July 1871	14 days	Liberal Unionist	The Duke of the Tower	Amadeo I (1871–1873)	
Eugenio Montero Ríos (Note: During the absences of the minister: Tomás Mosquera, Minister of Overseas (10–30 August 1871).) (1832–1914)	24 July 1871	5 October 1871	73 days	Progressive	Manuel Ruiz Zorrilla	Amadeo I (1871–1873)	
Eduardo Alonso Colmenares (1820–1888)	5 October 1871	26 May 1872	234 days	Independent	The Marquess of San Rafael	Amadeo I (1871–1873)	
Eduardo Alonso Colmenares (1820–1888)	5 October 1871	26 May 1872	234 days	Independent	Práxedes Mateo Sagasta	Amadeo I (1871–1873)	
Alejandro Groizard y Gómez de la Serna (1830–1919)	26 May 1872	13 June 1872	18 days	Constitutionalist	The Duke of the Tower	Amadeo I (1871–1873)	
Eugenio Montero Ríos (Note: During the absences of the minister: Cristino Martos y Balbí, Minister of State (13–21 June 1872) and Álvaro Gil Sanz, Under-Secretary (11 July to 25 August 1872).) (1832–1914)	13 June 1872	12 February 1873	244 days	Radical-Democrat	Manuel Ruiz Zorrilla	Amadeo I (1871–1873)	
Nicolás Salmerón (1838–1908)	12 February 1873	11 June 1873	119 days	Federal Republican	Estanislao Figueras	List of presidents of the First Republic	
José Fernando González (1836–1915)	11 June 1873	28 June 1873	17 days	Federal Republican	Francesc Pi i Margall	List of presidents of the First Republic	
Joaquín Gil Berges (1834–1920)	28 June 1873	18 July 1873	20 days	Federal Republican	Francesc Pi i Margall	List of presidents of the First Republic	
Pedro José Moreno Rodríguez (1839–1908)	18 July 1873	4 September 1873	48 days	Federal Republican	Nicolás Salmerón	List of presidents of the First Republic	
Luis del Río y Ramos (1824–1900)	8 September 1873	3 January 1874	117 days	Federal Republican	Emilio Castelar	List of presidents of the First Republic	
Eugenio García Ruiz (1818–1883) acting minister	3 January 1874	4 January 1874	1 day	Independent	The Duke of the Tower	List of presidents of the First Republic	
Cristino Martos y Balbí (1830–1893)	4 January 1874	13 May 1874	129 days	Radical-Democrat	The Duke of the Tower	List of presidents of the First Republic	
Manuel Alonso Martínez (1827–1891)	13 May 1874	3 September 1874	113 days	Constitutionalist	The Marquess of Sierra Bullones	List of presidents of the First Republic	
Eduardo Alonso Colmenares (1820–1888)	3 September 1874	31 December 1874	119 days	Independent	Práxedes Mateo Sagasta	List of presidents of the First Republic	
Francisco de Cárdenas Espejo (Note: During the absences of the minister: Antonio Cánovas del Castillo, Prime Minister (31 July to 19 August 1875).) (1817–1898)	31 December 1874	12 September 1875	255 days	Conservative	Antonio Cánovas del Castillo	Alfonso XII (1874–1885)	
The Marquess of Reinosa (Note: During the absences of the minister: Cristóbal Martín de Herrera, Minister of Development (12–16 September 1875).) (1811–1890)	12 September 1875	2 December 1875	81 days	Conservative	Joaquín Jovellar y Soler	Alfonso XII (1874–1885)	
Cristóbal Martín de Herrera (1831–1878)	2 December 1875	14 January 1877	1 year, 43 days	Conservative	Antonio Cánovas del Castillo	Alfonso XII (1874–1885)	
The Marquess of Reinosa (Note: During the absences of the minister: Manuel Orovio Echagüe, Marquess of Orovio, Minister of Finance (30 July to 30 August 1878).) (1811–1890)	14 January 1877	6 January 1879	1 year, 357 days	Conservative	Antonio Cánovas del Castillo	Alfonso XII (1874–1885)	
Saturnino Álvarez Bugallal (1834–1885)	6 January 1879	7 March 1879	60 days	Conservative	Antonio Cánovas del Castillo	Alfonso XII (1874–1885)	
Pedro Nolasco Aurioles (1818–1884)	7 March 1879	9 December 1879	277 days	Conservative	Arsenio Martínez Campos	Alfonso XII (1874–1885)	
Saturnino Álvarez Bugallal (1834–1885)	9 December 1879	8 February 1881	1 year, 61 days	Conservative	Antonio Cánovas del Castillo	Alfonso XII (1874–1885)	
Manuel Alonso Martínez (1827–1891)	8 February 1881	9 January 1883	1 year, 335 days	Liberal	Práxedes Mateo Sagasta	Alfonso XII (1874–1885)	
Vicente Romero Girón (1835–1900)	9 January 1883	13 October 1883	277 days	Liberal	Práxedes Mateo Sagasta	Alfonso XII (1874–1885)	
Aureliano Linares Rivas (1841–1903)	13 October 1883	18 January 1884	97 days	Liberal	José Posada Herrera	Alfonso XII (1874–1885)	
Francisco Silvela (1843–1905)	18 January 1884	27 November 1885	1 year, 313 days	Conservative	Antonio Cánovas del Castillo	Alfonso XII (1874–1885)	
Manuel Alonso Martínez (1827–1891)	27 November 1885	11 December 1888	3 years, 14 days	Liberal	Práxedes Mateo Sagasta	Alfonso XIII (1886–1931)	
José Canalejas y Méndez (1854–1912)	11 December 1888	21 January 1890	1 year, 41 days	Liberal	Práxedes Mateo Sagasta	Alfonso XIII (1886–1931)	
Joaquín López Puigcerver (1841–1906)	21 January 1890	5 July 1890	165 days	Liberal	Práxedes Mateo Sagasta	Alfonso XIII (1886–1931)	
The Marquess of Pozo Rubio (1848–1905)	5 July 1890	23 November 1891	1 year, 141 days	Conservative	Antonio Cánovas del Castillo	Alfonso XIII (1886–1931)	
Fernando Cos-Gayón (1825–1898)	23 November 1891	11 December 1892	1 year, 18 days	Conservative	Antonio Cánovas del Castillo	Alfonso XIII (1886–1931)	
Eugenio Montero Ríos (1832–1914)	11 December 1892	6 July 1893	207 days	Liberal	Práxedes Mateo Sagasta	Alfonso XIII (1886–1931)	
Trinitario Ruiz Capdepón (1836–1911)	6 July 1893	4 November 1894	1 year, 121 days	Liberal	Práxedes Mateo Sagasta	Alfonso XIII (1886–1931)	
Antonio Maura (Note: During the absences of the minister: Marcial González de la Fuente, Under-Secretary (27 July to 14 August 1894).) (1853–1925)	4 November 1894	23 March 1895	139 days	Liberal	Práxedes Mateo Sagasta	Alfonso XIII (1886–1931)	
Francisco Romero Robledo (1838–1906)	23 March 1895	14 December 1895	266 days	Conservative	Antonio Cánovas del Castillo†	Alfonso XIII (1886–1931)	
The Count of Tejada de Valdosera (1827–1911)	14 December 1895	4 October 1897	1 year, 294 days	Conservative	Antonio Cánovas del Castillo†	Alfonso XIII (1886–1931)	
The Count of Tejada de Valdosera (1827–1911)	14 December 1895	4 October 1897	1 year, 294 days	Conservative	Marcelo Azcárraga	Alfonso XIII (1886–1931)	
Alejandro Groizard y Gómez de la Serna (1830–1919)	4 October 1897	4 March 1899	1 year, 151 days	Liberal	Práxedes Mateo Sagasta	Alfonso XIII (1886–1931)	
Manuel Durán y Bas (1823–1907)	4 March 1899	24 October 1899	234 days	Conservative	Francisco Silvela	Alfonso XIII (1886–1931)	
The Count of Torreanaz (1827–1901)	24 October 1899	18 April 1900	176 days	Conservative	Francisco Silvela	Alfonso XIII (1886–1931)	
The Marquess of Vadillo (1848–1919)	18 April 1900	6 March 1901	322 days	Conservative	Francisco Silvela	Alfonso XIII (1886–1931)	
The Marquess of Vadillo (1848–1919)	18 April 1900	6 March 1901	322 days	Conservative	Marcelo Azcárraga	Alfonso XIII (1886–1931)	
The Marquess of Teverga (1841–1911)	6 March 1901	19 March 1902	1 year, 13 days	Liberal	Práxedes Mateo Sagasta	Alfonso XIII (1886–1931)	
Juan Montilla y Adán (1856–1903)	19 March 1902	15 November 1902	241 days	Liberal	Práxedes Mateo Sagasta	Alfonso XIII (1886–1931)	
Joaquín López Puigcerver (1841–1906)	15 November 1902	6 December 1902	21 days	Liberal	Práxedes Mateo Sagasta	Alfonso XIII (1886–1931)	
Eduardo Dato (1856–1921)	6 December 1902	20 July 1903	226 days	Conservative	Francisco Silvela	Alfonso XIII (1886–1931)	
Francisco Guzmán y Carballeda (1840–1916)	20 July 1903	5 December 1903	138 days	Conservative	The Marquess of Pozo Rubio	Alfonso XIII (1886–1931)	
Joaquín Sánchez de Toca (1852–1942)	5 December 1903	16 December 1904	1 year, 11 days	Conservative	Antonio Maura	Alfonso XIII (1886–1931)	
Francisco Javier Ugarte Pagés (1852–1919)	16 December 1904	27 January 1905	42 days	Conservative	Marcelo Azcárraga	Alfonso XIII (1886–1931)	
Francisco Javier Ugarte Pagés (1852–1919)	16 December 1904	27 January 1905	42 days	Conservative	The Marquess of Pozo Rubio	Alfonso XIII (1886–1931)	
Joaquín González de la Peña (1836–1908)	23 June 1905	31 October 1905	130 days	Liberal	Eugenio Montero Ríos	Alfonso XIII (1886–1931)	
Joaquín López Puigcerver (1841–1906)	31 October 1905	1 December 1905	31 days	Liberal	Eugenio Montero Ríos	Alfonso XIII (1886–1931)	
The Marquess of Alhucemas (1859–1938)	1 December 1905	10 June 1906	191 days	Liberal	Segismundo Moret	Alfonso XIII (1886–1931)	
José María Celleruelo (1840–1911)	10 June 1906	6 July 1906	26 days	Liberal	Segismundo Moret	Alfonso XIII (1886–1931)	
The Count of Romanones (1863–1950)	6 July 1906	30 November 1906	173 days	Liberal	José López Domínguez	Alfonso XIII (1886–1931)	
Antonio Barroso y Castillo (1854–1916)	30 November 1906	25 January 1907	56 days	Liberal	Segismundo Moret	Alfonso XIII (1886–1931)	
Antonio Barroso y Castillo (1854–1916)	30 November 1906	25 January 1907	56 days	Liberal	The Marquess of Vega de Armijo	Alfonso XIII (1886–1931)	
The Marquess of Figueroa (Note: Acting during absence of the Minister: Pascual Amat y Esteve, Under-Secretary (17 September – 4 October 1907; 31 August – 22 September 1908 and 11–17 November 1908).) (1861–1932)	25 January 1907	21 October 1909	2 years, 269 days	Conservative	Antonio Maura	Alfonso XIII (1886–1931)	
Eduardo Martínez del Campo y Acosta (1840–1911)	21 October 1909	9 February 1910	111 days	Liberal	Segismundo Moret	Alfonso XIII (1886–1931)	
Trinitario Ruiz Valarino (1862–1945)	9 February 1910	3 April 1911	1 year, 53 days	Liberal	José Canalejas y Méndez†	Alfonso XIII (1886–1931)	
Antonio Barroso y Castillo (1854–1916)	3 April 1911	29 June 1911	87 days	Liberal	José Canalejas y Méndez†	Alfonso XIII (1886–1931)	
José Canalejas y Méndez (1854–1912)	29 June 1911	12 March 1912	257 days	Liberal	José Canalejas y Méndez†	Alfonso XIII (1886–1931)	
Diego Arias de Miranda (1845–1929)	12 March 1912	31 December 1912	294 days	Liberal	José Canalejas y Méndez†	Alfonso XIII (1886–1931)	
Diego Arias de Miranda (1845–1929)	12 March 1912	31 December 1912	294 days	Liberal	The Marquess of Alhucemas (Note: He acted as acting prime minister after the assassination of José Canalejas on 12 November 1912)	Alfonso XIII (1886–1931)	
Diego Arias de Miranda (1845–1929)	12 March 1912	31 December 1912	294 days	Liberal	The Count of Romanones	Alfonso XIII (1886–1931)	
Antonio Barroso y Castillo (1854–1916)	31 December 1912	24 May 1913	144 days	Liberal	The Count of Romanones	Alfonso XIII (1886–1931)	
The Count of Romanones (1863–1950)	24 May 1913	13 June 1913	20 days	Liberal	The Count of Romanones	Alfonso XIII (1886–1931)	
Pedro Rodríguez de la Borbolla (1855–1922)	13 June 1913	27 October 1913	136 days	Liberal	The Count of Romanones	Alfonso XIII (1886–1931)	
The Marquess of Vadillo (1848–1919)	27 October 1913	7 September 1914	315 days	Conservative	Eduardo Dato	Alfonso XIII (1886–1931)	
Eduardo Dato (1856–1921)	7 September 1914	4 January 1915	119 days	Conservative	Eduardo Dato	Alfonso XIII (1886–1931)	
Manuel de Burgos y Mazo (1862–1946)	4 January 1915	9 December 1915	339 days	Conservative	Eduardo Dato	Alfonso XIII (1886–1931)	
Antonio Barroso y Castillo (1854–1916)	9 December 1915	8 October 1916	304 days	Liberal	The Count of Romanones	Alfonso XIII (1886–1931)	
Juan Alvarado y del Saz (Note: Francisco Javier Jiménez de la Puente, Count of Santa Engracia, Under-Secretary (18–22 January 1917 and 17–21 March 1917)) (1856–1935)	11 October 1916	19 April 1917	190 days	Liberal	The Count of Romanones	Alfonso XIII (1886–1931)	
Trinitario Ruiz Valarino (1862–1945)	19 April 1917	11 June 1917	53 days	Liberal	The Marquess of Alhucemas	Alfonso XIII (1886–1931)	
Manuel de Burgos y Mazo (1862–1946)	11 June 1917	3 November 1917	145 days	Conservative	Eduardo Dato	Alfonso XIII (1886–1931)	
Joaquín Fernández Prida (1863–1942)	3 November 1917	2 March 1918	119 days	Conservative	The Marquess of Alhucemas	Alfonso XIII (1886–1931)	
The Count of Romanones (1863–1950)	22 March 1918	10 October 1918	202 days	Liberal	Antonio Maura	Alfonso XIII (1886–1931)	
Antonio Maura (1853–1925) acting minister	10 October 1918	9 November 1918	30 days	Conservative	Antonio Maura	Alfonso XIII (1886–1931)	
José Roig y Bergadá (1864–1937)	9 November 1918	5 December 1918	26 days	Liberal	The Marquess of Alhucemas	Alfonso XIII (1886–1931)	
Alejandro Rosselló y Pastor (1853–1928)	5 December 1918	15 April 1919	131 days	Liberal	The Count of Romanones	Alfonso XIII (1886–1931)	
The Viscount of Matamala (1849–1923)	15 April 1919	20 July 1919	96 days	Conservative	Antonio Maura	Alfonso XIII (1886–1931)	
Pascual Amat y Esteve (1856–1928)	20 July 1919	12 December 1919	145 days	Conservative	Joaquín Sánchez de Toca	Alfonso XIII (1886–1931)	
Pablo Garnica y Echevarría (1876–1959)	12 December 1919	5 May 1920	145 days	Liberal	Manuel Allendesalazar	Alfonso XIII (1886–1931)	
The Count of Bugallal (Note: José Martínez Acacio, Under-Secretary (9–26 August 1920 and 25 October – 2 November 1920).) (1861–1932)	5 May 1920	1 September 1920	119 days	Conservative	Eduardo Dato†	Alfonso XIII (1886–1931)	
Mariano Ordóñez García (1874–1938)	1 September 1920	13 March 1921	193 days	Conservative	Eduardo Dato†	Alfonso XIII (1886–1931)	
Mariano Ordóñez García (1874–1938)	1 September 1920	13 March 1921	193 days	Conservative	The Count of Bugallal (Note: He acted acting prime minister after the assassination of Eduardo Dato from March 8 to March 13, 1921)	Alfonso XIII (1886–1931)	
Vicente Piniés Bayona (1875–1943)	13 March 1921	7 July 1921	116 days	Conservative	Manuel Allendesalazar	Alfonso XIII (1886–1931)	
Julio Wais San Martín (1878–1954)	7 July 1921	14 August 1921	38 days	Conservative	Manuel Allendesalazar	Alfonso XIII (1886–1931)	
José Francos Rodríguez (1862–1931)	14 August 1921	8 March 1922	206 days	Liberal Democrat	Antonio Maura	Alfonso XIII (1886–1931)	
José Bertrán y Musitu (1855–1937)	8 March 1922	1 April 1922	24 days	Conservative	José Sánchez-Guerra y Martínez	Alfonso XIII (1886–1931)	
Mariano Ordóñez García (1874–1938)	1 April 1922	4 December 1922	247 days	Conservative	José Sánchez-Guerra y Martínez	Alfonso XIII (1886–1931)	
Carlos Cañal y Migolla (1876–1938)	4 December 1922	7 December 1922	3 days	Conservative	José Sánchez-Guerra y Martínez	Alfonso XIII (1886–1931)	
The Count of Romanones (1863–1950)	7 December 1922	26 May 1923	170 days	Liberal	The Marquess of Alhucemas	Alfonso XIII (1886–1931)	
The Count of López Muñoz (Note: Carlos Testor y Pascual, Under-Secretary (22 August – 4 September 1923).) (1850–1929)	26 May 1923	15 September 1923	112 days	Liberal	The Marquess of Alhucemas	Alfonso XIII (1886–1931)	
Fernando Cadalso Manzano (Note: Ordinary discharge of duties.) (1859–1939) acting minister	17 September 1923	21 December 1923	95 days	Independent	The Marquess of Estella	Alfonso XIII (1886–1931)	
Ernesto Jiménez Sánchez (1859–1928) acting minister	21 December 1923	22 January 1924	32 days	Independent	The Marquess of Estella	Alfonso XIII (1886–1931)	
Francisco García Goyena y Alzugaray (1859–1931) acting minister	22 January 1924	3 December 1925	1 year, 315 days	Independent	The Marquess of Estella	Alfonso XIII (1886–1931)	
Galo Ponte y Escartín (Note: Ramón García del Valle y Salas, Director-General for Judicial and Ecclesiastical Affairs (9–13 January 1930).) (1867–1943)	3 December 1925	30 January 1930	4 years, 58 days	Patriotic Unionist	The Marquess of Estella	Alfonso XIII (1886–1931)	
José Estrada y Estrada (1874–1936)	30 January 1930	25 November 1930	299 days	Conservative	The Count of Xauen	Alfonso XIII (1886–1931)	
Joaquín de Montes y Jovellar (1879–1936)	25 November 1930	14 February 1931	81 days	Conservative	The Count of Xauen	Alfonso XIII (1886–1931)	
The Marquess of Alhucemas (1859–1938)	18 February 1931	14 April 1931	55 days	Liberal Democrat	Juan Bautista Aznar-Cabañas	Alfonso XIII (1886–1931)	
Fernando de los Ríos (Note: During the absence of the Minister: Justino de Azcárate, Under-Secretary (23–27 May 1931).) (1879–1949)	14 April 1931	16 December 1931	246 days	Socialist	Niceto Alcalá-Zamora	Niceto Alcalá-Zamora (1931–1936)	
Fernando de los Ríos (1879–1949)	14 April 1931	16 December 1931	246 days	Socialist	Manuel Azaña	Niceto Alcalá-Zamora (1931–1936)	
Álvaro de Albornoz (Note: During the absence of the Minister: Leopoldo García-Alas García-Argüelles, Under-Secretary (30 December 1931 to 2 January 1932; 5–10 February 1932; 12–16 February 1932; and 16–19 September 1932) and Luis Fernández Clérigo, Director-General for Registries and Notaries (28 May to 1 June 1932).) (1879–1954)	16 December 1931	14 July 1933	1 year, 210 days	Radical Socialist Republican	Manuel Azaña	Niceto Alcalá-Zamora (1931–1936)	
Santiago Casares Quiroga (1884–1950) acting minister	14 July 1933	12 September 1933	60 days	Galician Republican	Manuel Azaña	Niceto Alcalá-Zamora (1931–1936)	
Juan Botella Asensi (Note: During the absence of the Minister: Domingo Barnés Salinas, Minister of Public Instruction and Fine Arts (21–27 November 1933).) (1884–1942)	12 September 1933	29 November 1933	78 days	Radical Socialist Left	Alejandro Lerroux	Niceto Alcalá-Zamora (1931–1936)	
Juan Botella Asensi (1884–1942)	12 September 1933	29 November 1933	78 days	Radical Socialist Left	Diego Martínez Barrio	Niceto Alcalá-Zamora (1931–1936)	
Domingo Barnés Salinas (1879–1940) acting minister	29 November 1933	16 December 1933	17 days	Radical Socialist Republican	Diego Martínez Barrio	Niceto Alcalá-Zamora (1931–1936)	
Ramón Álvarez-Valdés (1866–1936)	16 December 1933	17 April 1934	122 days	Republican Liberal Democrat	Alejandro Lerroux	Niceto Alcalá-Zamora (1931–1936)	
Salvador de Madariaga (1886–1978) acting minister	17 April 1934	28 April 1934	11 days	Independent	Alejandro Lerroux	Niceto Alcalá-Zamora (1931–1936)	
Vicente Cantos Figuerola (1868–1943)	28 April 1934	4 October 1934	159 days	Radical Republican	Ricardo Samper	Niceto Alcalá-Zamora (1931–1936)	
Rafael Aizpún Santafé (1889–1981)	4 October 1934	3 April 1935	181 days	CEDA	Alejandro Lerroux	Niceto Alcalá-Zamora (1931–1936)	
Vicente Cantos Figuerola (1868–1943)	3 April 1935	6 May 1935	33 days	Radical Republican	Alejandro Lerroux	Niceto Alcalá-Zamora (1931–1936)	
Cándido Casanueva y Gorjón (1881–1947)	6 May 1935	25 September 1935	142 days	Agrarian	Alejandro Lerroux	Niceto Alcalá-Zamora (1931–1936)	
Federico Salmón Amorín (1900–1936)	25 September 1935	14 December 1935	80 days	CEDA	Joaquín Chapaprieta	Niceto Alcalá-Zamora (1931–1936)	
Alfredo Martínez García-Argüelles (1877–1936)	14 December 1935	30 December 1935	16 days	Republican Liberal Democrat	Manuel Portela Valladares	Niceto Alcalá-Zamora (1931–1936)	
Manuel Becerra Fernández (1867–1940)	30 December 1935	19 February 1936	51 days	Radical Republican	Manuel Portela Valladares	Niceto Alcalá-Zamora (1931–1936)	
Antonio Lara Zárate (1881–1956)	19 February 1936	13 May 1936	84 days	Radical Republican	Manuel Azaña	Niceto Alcalá-Zamora (1931–1936)	
Antonio Lara Zárate (1881–1956)	19 February 1936	13 May 1936	84 days	Radical Republican	Augusto Barcia Trelles (Note: Acting prime minister from 10 to 13 May 1936)	Manuel Azaña (1936–1939)	
Manuel Blasco Garzón (1885–1954)	13 May 1936	4 September 1936	114 days	Republican Union	Santiago Casares Quiroga	Manuel Azaña (1936–1939)	
Manuel Blasco Garzón (1885–1954)	13 May 1936	4 September 1936	114 days	Republican Union	Diego Martínez Barrio	Manuel Azaña (1936–1939)	
Manuel Blasco Garzón (1885–1954)	13 May 1936	4 September 1936	114 days	Republican Union	José Giral	Manuel Azaña (1936–1939)	
Mariano Ruiz-Funes (1889–1953)	4 September 1936	4 November 1936	61 days	Republican Left	Francisco Largo Caballero	Manuel Azaña (1936–1939)	
Juan García Oliver (1901–1980)	4 November 1936	17 May 1937	194 days	Independent (CNT)	Francisco Largo Caballero	Manuel Azaña (1936–1939)	
Manuel de Irujo (1891–1981)	17 May 1937	10 December 1937	207 days	Basque Nationalist	Juan Negrín	Manuel Azaña (1936–1939)	
Mariano Ansó (1899–1981)	10 December 1937	5 April 1938	116 days	Republican Left	Juan Negrín	Manuel Azaña (1936–1939)	
Ramón González Peña (Note: During the absence of the Minister: Juan Negrín, Prime Minister (16–17 August 1938; 24 August to 14 September 1938, and 27 September to 1 October 1938); Julio Álvarez del Vayo, Minister of State (17–24 August 1938), and Tomás Bilbao Hospitalet, Minister without portfolio (14–27 September 1938).) (1888–1952)	5 April 1938	5 March 1939	334 days	Socialist	Juan Negrín	Manuel Azaña (1936–1939)	
Miguel San Andrés Castro (?–1940)	5 March 1939	31 March 1939	26 days	Republican Left	National Defence Council	José Miaja (1939)	
José Cortés López (Note: Serving under the title of "Chairman of the Justice Commission".) (1886–1946)	3 October 1936	31 January 1938	1 year, 120 days	Independent	Junta Técnica del Estado	Francisco Franco (1939–1975)	
The Count of Rodezno (1882–1952)	31 January 1938	9 August 1939	1 year, 190 days	National Movement	Franco I	Francisco Franco (1939–1975)	
The Marquess of Bilbao Eguía (Note: During the absence of the Minister: Juan Angel Ortigosa Irigoyen, Under-Secretary (19 August to 2 September 1940).) (1879–1970)	9 August 1939	15 March 1943	3 years, 218 days	National Movement	Franco II	Francisco Franco (1939–1975)	
Eduardo Aunós (1894–1967)	15 March 1943	20 July 1945	2 years, 127 days	National Movement	Franco II	Francisco Franco (1939–1975)	
The Count of San Rodrigo (1896–1992)	20 July 1945	19 July 1951	5 years, 364 days	National Movement	Franco III	Francisco Franco (1939–1975)	
Antonio Iturmendi Bañales (1903–1976)	19 July 1951	7 July 1965	13 years, 353 days	National Movement	Franco IV	Francisco Franco (1939–1975)	
Antonio Iturmendi Bañales (1903–1976)	19 July 1951	7 July 1965	13 years, 353 days	National Movement	Franco V	Francisco Franco (1939–1975)	
Antonio Iturmendi Bañales (1903–1976)	19 July 1951	7 July 1965	13 years, 353 days	National Movement	Franco VI	Francisco Franco (1939–1975)	
Antonio María Oriol Urquijo (1913–1996)	7 July 1965	11 June 1973	7 years, 339 days	National Movement	Franco VII	Francisco Franco (1939–1975)	
Antonio María Oriol Urquijo (1913–1996)	7 July 1965	11 June 1973	7 years, 339 days	National Movement	Franco VIII	Francisco Franco (1939–1975)	
Francisco Ruiz-Jarabo (1901–1990)	11 June 1973	4 March 1975	1 year, 266 days	National Movement	Luis Carrero Blanco†	Francisco Franco (1939–1975)	
Francisco Ruiz-Jarabo (1901–1990)	11 June 1973	4 March 1975	1 year, 266 days	National Movement	The Duke of Fernández-Miranda (acting)	Francisco Franco (1939–1975)	
Francisco Ruiz-Jarabo (1901–1990)	11 June 1973	4 March 1975	1 year, 266 days	National Movement	The Marquess of Arias Navarro	Francisco Franco (1939–1975)	
José María Sánchez-Ventura (1922–2017)	4 March 1975	11 December 1975	282 days	National Movement	The Marquess of Arias Navarro	Francisco Franco (1939–1975)	
José María Sánchez-Ventura (1922–2017)	4 March 1975	11 December 1975	282 days	National Movement	The Marquess of Arias Navarro	Juan Carlos I (1975–2014)	
The Marquess of Garrigues (1904–2004)	11 December 1975	7 July 1976	209 days	National Movement	The Marquess of Arias Navarro	Juan Carlos I (1975–2014)	
Landelino Lavilla (1934–2020)	7 July 1976	23 March 1979	2 years, 259 days	Centrist	The Duke of Suárez	Juan Carlos I (1975–2014)	
Rodolfo Martín Villa (born 1934) acting minister	23 March 1979	5 April 1979	13 days	Centrist	The Duke of Suárez	Juan Carlos I (1975–2014)	
The Marquess of Castillo de Aysa (1929–2002)	5 April 1979	8 September 1980	1 year, 156 days	Centrist	The Duke of Suárez	Juan Carlos I (1975–2014)	
Francisco Fernández Ordóñez (1930–1992)	8 September 1980	31 August 1981	357 days	Centrist	The Duke of Suárez	Juan Carlos I (1975–2014)	
Francisco Fernández Ordóñez (1930–1992)	8 September 1980	31 August 1981	357 days	Centrist	The Marquess of Ría de Ribadeo	Juan Carlos I (1975–2014)	
Pío Cabanillas Gallas (1923–1991)	31 August 1981	2 December 1982	1 year, 93 days	Centrist	The Marquess of Ría de Ribadeo	Juan Carlos I (1975–2014)	
Fernando Ledesma (born 1939)	2 December 1982	11 July 1988	5 years, 222 days	Independent	Felipe González	Juan Carlos I (1975–2014)	
Enrique Múgica (1932–2020)	11 July 1988	12 March 1991	2 years, 244 days	Socialist	Felipe González	Juan Carlos I (1975–2014)	
Tomás de la Quadra-Salcedo (born 1946)	12 March 1991	13 July 1993	2 years, 123 days	Socialist	Felipe González	Juan Carlos I (1975–2014)	
Juan Alberto Belloch (born 1950)	13 July 1993	6 May 1996	2 years, 298 days	Independent	Felipe González	Juan Carlos I (1975–2014)	
Margarita Mariscal de Gante (born 1954)	6 May 1996	28 April 2000	3 years, 359 days	Independent	José María Aznar	Juan Carlos I (1975–2014)	
Ángel Acebes (born 1958)	28 April 2000	10 July 2002	2 years, 73 days	Popular	José María Aznar	Juan Carlos I (1975–2014)	
José María Michavila (born 1960)	10 July 2002	18 April 2004	1 year, 283 days	Popular	José María Aznar	Juan Carlos I (1975–2014)	
Juan Fernando López Aguilar (born 1961)	18 April 2004	13 February 2007	2 years, 301 days	Socialist	José Luis Rodríguez Zapatero	Juan Carlos I (1975–2014)	
Mariano Fernández Bermejo (born 1948)	13 February 2007	24 February 2009	2 years, 11 days	Independent	José Luis Rodríguez Zapatero	Juan Carlos I (1975–2014)	
Francisco Caamaño Domínguez (born 1963)	24 February 2009	22 December 2011	2 years, 301 days	Socialist	José Luis Rodríguez Zapatero	Juan Carlos I (1975–2014)	
Alberto Ruiz-Gallardón (born 1958)	22 December 2011	24 September 2014	2 years, 276 days	Popular	Mariano Rajoy	Juan Carlos I (1975–2014)	
Alberto Ruiz-Gallardón (born 1958)	22 December 2011	24 September 2014	2 years, 276 days	Popular	Mariano Rajoy	Felipe VI (2014-present)	
Soraya Sáenz de Santamaría (born 1971) acting minister	24 September 2014	29 September 2014	5 days	Popular	Mariano Rajoy	Felipe VI (2014-present)	
Rafael Catalá (born 1961)	29 September 2014	7 June 2018	3 years, 251 days	Popular	Mariano Rajoy	Felipe VI (2014-present)	
Dolores Delgado (born 1962)	7 June 2018	13 January 2020	1 year, 220 days	Independent	Pedro Sánchez	Felipe VI (2014-present)	
Juan Carlos Campo (born 1961)	13 January 2020	12 July 2021	1 year, 180 days	Independent	Pedro Sánchez	Felipe VI (2014-present)	
Pilar Llop (born 1973)	12 July 2021	21 November 2023	2 years, 132 days	Independent	Pedro Sánchez	Felipe VI (2014-present)	
Félix Bolaños (born 1975)	21 November 2023	Incumbent	2 years, 357 days	Socialist	Pedro Sánchez	Felipe VI (2014-present)	

== Bibliography ==
- Gómez-Rivero, Ricardo (1988). Los origenes del Ministero de Justicia (1714-1812) [The origins of the Ministry of Justice (1714–1812)] (in Spanish) (Digital ed.). Madrid: Ministry of Justice. pp. 40–48. ISBN 978-84-7787-023-4.
