= Manuel Alonso Martínez =

Spanish jurist and politician

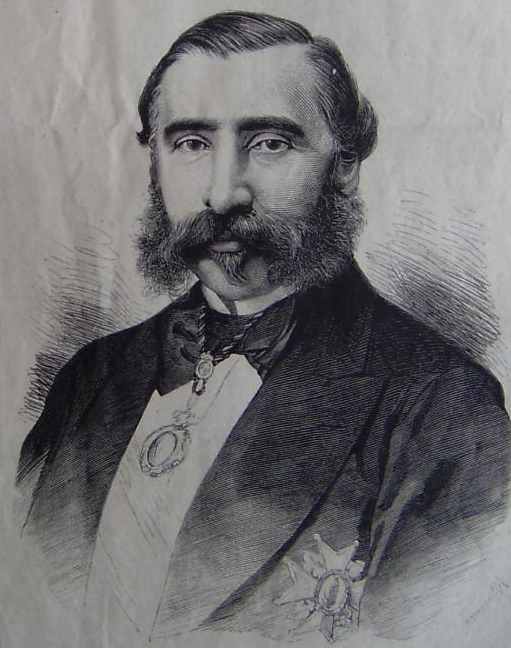
- Manuel Alonso Martínez, La Ilustración Española y Americana, 1874

President of the Congress of Deputies
- In office 14 June 1889 – 29 December 1890
- Monarch: Alfonso XIII
- Regent: Maria Christina of Austria
- Preceded by: Cristino Martos y Balbí
- Succeeded by: Alejandro Pidal y Mon

Minister of Development of Spain
- In office 6 June 1855 – 15 January 1856
- Monarch: Isabella II
- Prime Minister: Baldomero Espartero
- Preceded by: Francisco de Luxán
- Succeeded by: Francisco de Luxán
- In office 4 August 1863 – 17 January 1864
- Monarch: Isabella II
- Prime Minister: Manuel de Pando
- Preceded by: Manuel Moreno López
- Succeeded by: Claudio Moyano

Minister of Finance of Spain
- In office 21 June 1865 – 28 May 1866
- Monarch: Isabella II
- Prime Minister: Leopoldo O'Donnell
- Preceded by: Alejandro de Castro y Casal
- Succeeded by: Antonio Cánovas del Castillo (as acting)

Minister of Justice of Spain
- In office 13 May – 3 September 1874
- President: Francisco Serrano
- Prime Minister: Juan de Zavala
- Preceded by: Cristino Martos y Balbí
- Succeeded by: Eduardo Alonso Colmenares
- In office 8 February 1881 – 9 January 1883
- Monarch: Alfonso XII
- Prime Minister: Práxedes Mateo Sagasta
- Preceded by: Saturnino Álvarez Bugallal
- Succeeded by: Vicente Romero Girón
- In office 27 November 1885 – 11 December 1888
- Monarch: Alfonso XIII
- Regent: Maria Christina of Austria
- Prime Minister: Práxedes Mateo Sagasta
- Preceded by: Francisco Silvela
- Succeeded by: José Canalejas

Personal details
- Born: 1 January 1827 Burgos, Spain
- Died: 13 January 1891 (aged 64) Madrid, Spain
- Resting place: Saint Isidore Cemetery
- Party: Progressive Party; Liberal Union; Liberal Party
- Spouse: Demetria Martín y Baraya
- Children: Vicente Alonso Martínez

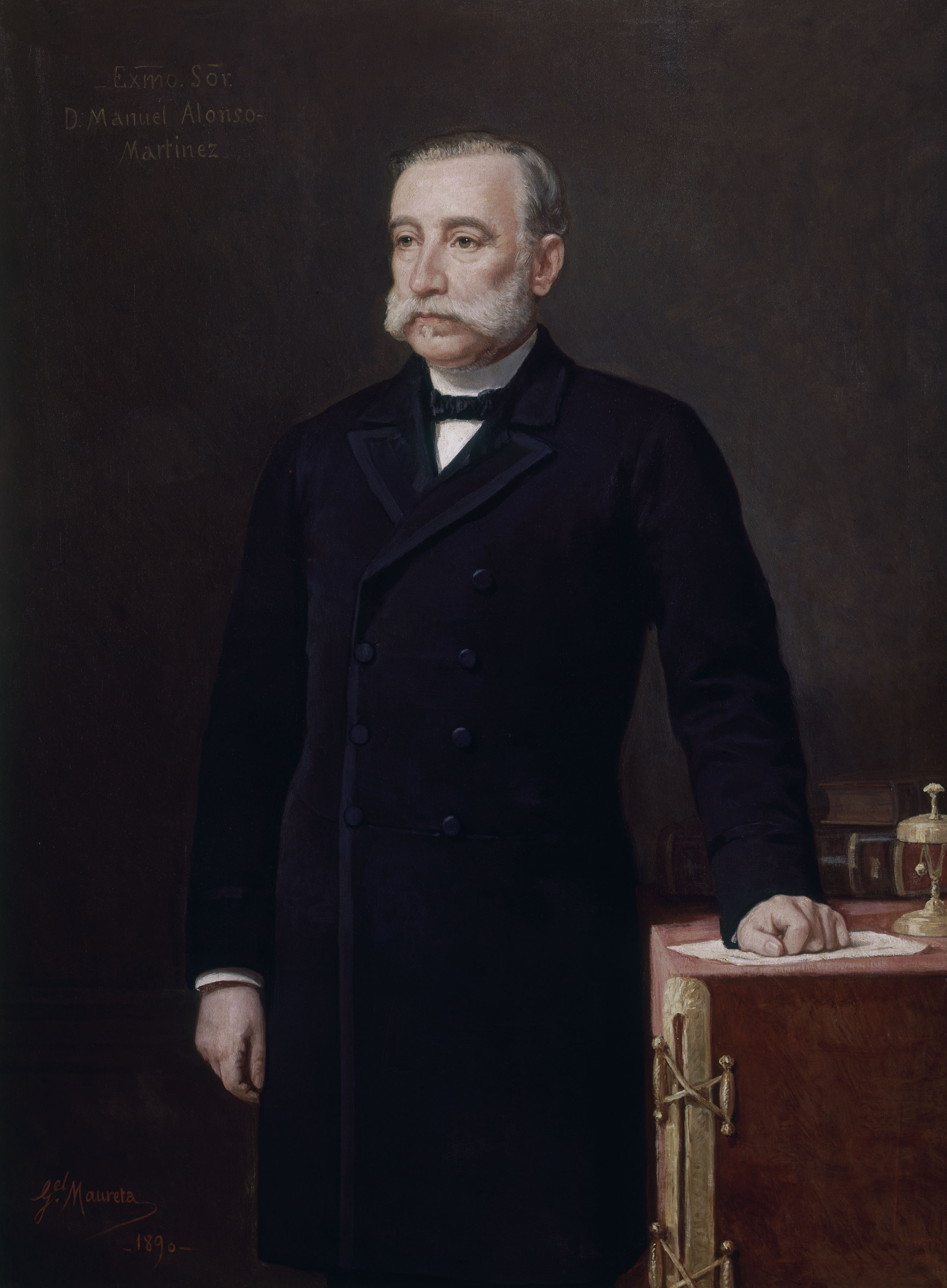
Manuel Alonso Martínez (1890), by Gabriel Maureta y Aracil

Manuel Alonso Martínez (1827, Burgos – 1891, Madrid) was a Spanish jurist and politician, and the principal redactor of the Spanish Civil Code.

After working as a Burgos attorney, he entered public service in 1854 as a member of the Cortes. During his political career, he served as Minister of Development, of Finance, of Grace and Justice, as governor of Madrid and as the 139th president of the Congress of Deputies. He was instrumental in pursuing the codification of Spanish civil law.

His widow, Doña Demetria Martín y Baraya, received in 1891 the title of Marchioness of Alonso Martínez.
