= Micaela Ximénez de Frías Zayas Pizarro =

Micaela Ximénez de Frías Zayas Pizarro (23 January 1746 – 1815), was a Spanish courtier. She was an influential favorite and confidant of the queen of Spain, Maria Luisa of Parma. She is perhaps most known for having exposed Alejandro Malaspina's plot against the queen and Manuel Godoy in 1795.

== Life and career ==
Micaela Ximénez de Frías Zayas Pizarro was born to Francisco Ximénez de Frías y del Rey and Josefa María Pizarro y Zayas. She married the nobleman, marshall and official José García de León y Pizarro, governor of Quito, with whom she had four children, among them José García de León y Pizarro.

She attended the royal court in between accompanying her husband to his different posts. Due to the status of her own family, her husband's family, and her husband's personal career, she was formally appointed lady-in-waiting for the Crown Princess, Maria Luisa of Parma, in 1769. She managed to aquire considerable influence at court as the personal friend and confidante of Maria Luisa, especially after Maria Luisa became queen in 1788. She used her contacts to benefit the career of her son José García, who became a diplomat in 1790, and was appointed foreign minister in 1794.

Her influence was dependent on the queen and the queen's favorite Manuel Godoy, and she proved her loyalty to them. In 1795, Doña Micaela exposed and thus prevented a plot against the queen and Godoy prepared by Alejandro Malaspina. This act of loyalty further strengthened her position and influence at court. The career of her son José María, who became prime minister in 1812, is attributed to her influence.

Queen Luisa Maria lost her position and was exiled in 1808, which also terminated the position of Micaela Ximénez. She died in Madrid in 1815.
