= Francisco Romero Robledo =

Spanish politician (1838–1906)

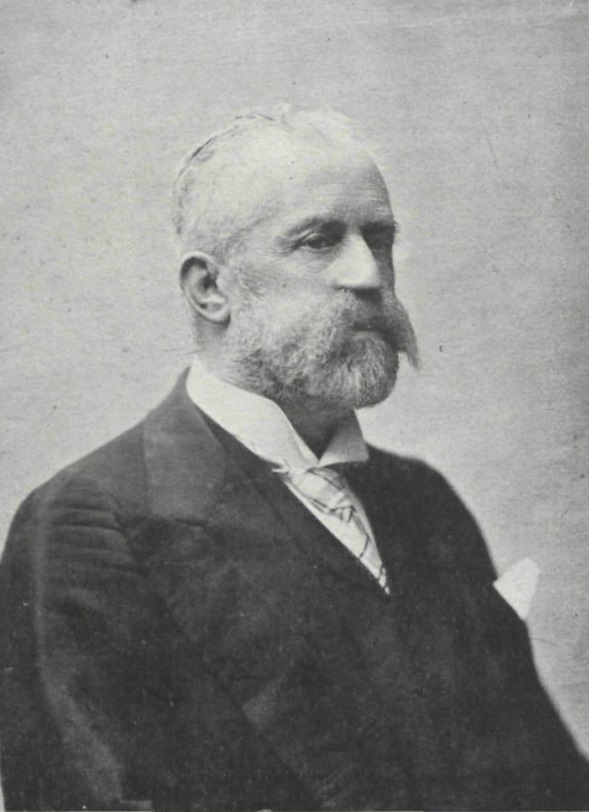
- Francisco Romero Robledo, de Franzen

Under Secretary of Governance of Spain
- In office 10 January – 1 April 1871
- Monarch: Amadeo I
- Prime Minister: Francisco Serrano
- Minister of Governance: Práxedes Mateo Sagasta
- Preceded by: Federico Balart
- Succeeded by: Federico Balart

Minister of Development of Spain
- In office 20 February – 26 May 1872
- Monarch: Amadeo I
- Prime Minister: Praxedes Mateo Sagasta
- Preceded by: Alejandro Groizard
- Succeeded by: Víctor Balaguer i Cirera

Minister of Governance of Spain
- In office 31 December 1874 – 7 March 1879
- Monarch: Alfonso XII
- Prime Minister: Antonio Cánovas del Castillo; Joaquin Jovellar y Soler; Antonio Cánovas del Castillo
- Preceded by: Práxedes Mateo Sagasta
- Succeeded by: Francisco Silvela
- In office 9 December 1879 – 8 February 1881
- Monarch: Alfonso XII
- Prime Minister: Antonio Cánovas del Castillo
- Preceded by: Francisco Silvela
- Succeeded by: Venancio González y Fernández
- In office 18 January 1884 – 13 July 1885
- Monarch: Alfonso XII
- Prime Minister: Antonio Cánovas del Castillo
- Preceded by: Segismundo Moret
- Succeeded by: Raimundo Fernández-Villaverde

Minister of Overseas of Spain
- In office 23 November 1891 – 11 December 1892
- Monarch: Alfonso XIII
- Regent: Maria Christina of Austria
- Prime Minister: Antonio Cánovas del Castillo
- Preceded by: Antonio María Fabié
- Succeeded by: Antonio Maura

Minister of Justice of Spain
- In office 23 March – 14 December 1895
- Monarch: Alfonso XIII
- Regent: Maria Christina of Austria
- Prime Minister: Antonio Cánovas del Castillo
- Preceded by: Antonio Maura
- Succeeded by: Manuel Aguirre de Tejada

President of the Congress of Deputies
- In office 20 October 1903 – 17 August 1905
- Monarch: Alfonso XIII
- Regent: Maria Christina of Austria
- Preceded by: Raimundo Fernández-Villaverde
- Succeeded by: Antonio Aguilar y Correa

Personal details
- Born: 8 March 1838 Antequera, Spain
- Died: 3 March 1906 (aged 67) Madrid, Spain
- Party: Constitutional Party; Conservative Party
- Nickname(s): El Pollo de Antequera; El Polla larga

Francisco Romero Robledo (8 March 1838, in Antequera, Spain – 3 March 1906, in Madrid, Spain) was a Spanish politician who held several ministerial positions throughout his career. He served as Minister of Development in 1872 and as Minister of Governance during three terms: from 1874 to 1879, 1879 to 1881 and 1884 to 1885. He was also Minister of Overseas from 1891 to 1892 and Minister of Grace and Justice in 1895.
