= Manuel Durán y Bas =

Spanish jurist

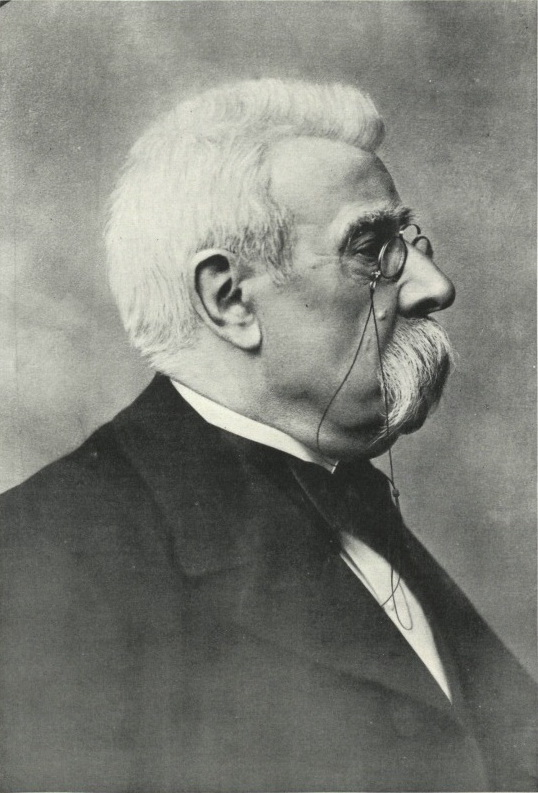
Manuel Durán y Bas photographed by Audouard

Manuel Durán y Bas (29 November 1823, Barcelona – 10 February 1907, Barcelona) was one of the leading Spanish jurists of his generation and served as Spanish Minister of Justice in 1899.

== Life ==
Durán y Bas graduated with a doctorate in law from the University of Barcelona in 1852, was appointed to the chair of commercial law there in 1862 and served as the university's rector in 1896. As a renowned advocate, he represented the interests of the preeminent Catalan families and served on the boards of many academic and commercial institutions.

In 1863, Durán y Bas was elected as a member of the Spanish Congress for the province of Barcelona and obtained reelection in 1865, 1879 and 1884. In 1886, he entered the Senate as a representative of the Barcelona Economic Society, and was named senator for life in 1891. From March 4 to October 25, 1899, he served as Minister of Justice in the cabinet of Francisco Silvela.

== Impact on Spanish law ==
Durán y Bas adhered to Savigny's "historical" school of thought, maintaining that law ought to be a reflection of the "national spirit" as established in local customary law. Accordingly, he opposed the "philosophical" school dominant in 19th century Spain which sought to unify and codify the national law based on the principles of rationalism and natural law.

Although politically opposed to the unifying codification of Spanish law, he was a leading contributor to the 1888 Código civil. By compiling a list of the institutions of Catalan law that would continue to apply as exceptions under the new Civil Code, he helped to preserve the wealth and influence of Catalonia's leading families, whose advocate he was. His 1888 Memoria restating the law of Catalonia caused a lasting revival of Catalan law.

== Partial bibliography ==
- Estudios económicos (1856)
- Consideraciones sobre la historia de la ciencia del derecho (1863)
- Memoria acerca de las instituciones del derecho civil de Cataluña (1883)
- Escritos. Primera serie. Estudios jurídicos (1888)
- La escuela jurídica catalana (1891)
- Escritos. Segunda serie. Estudios sociales, morales y económicos (1895)
