= Manuel Aguirre de Tejada =

Spanish politician and lawyer

The Count of Tejada de Valdosera
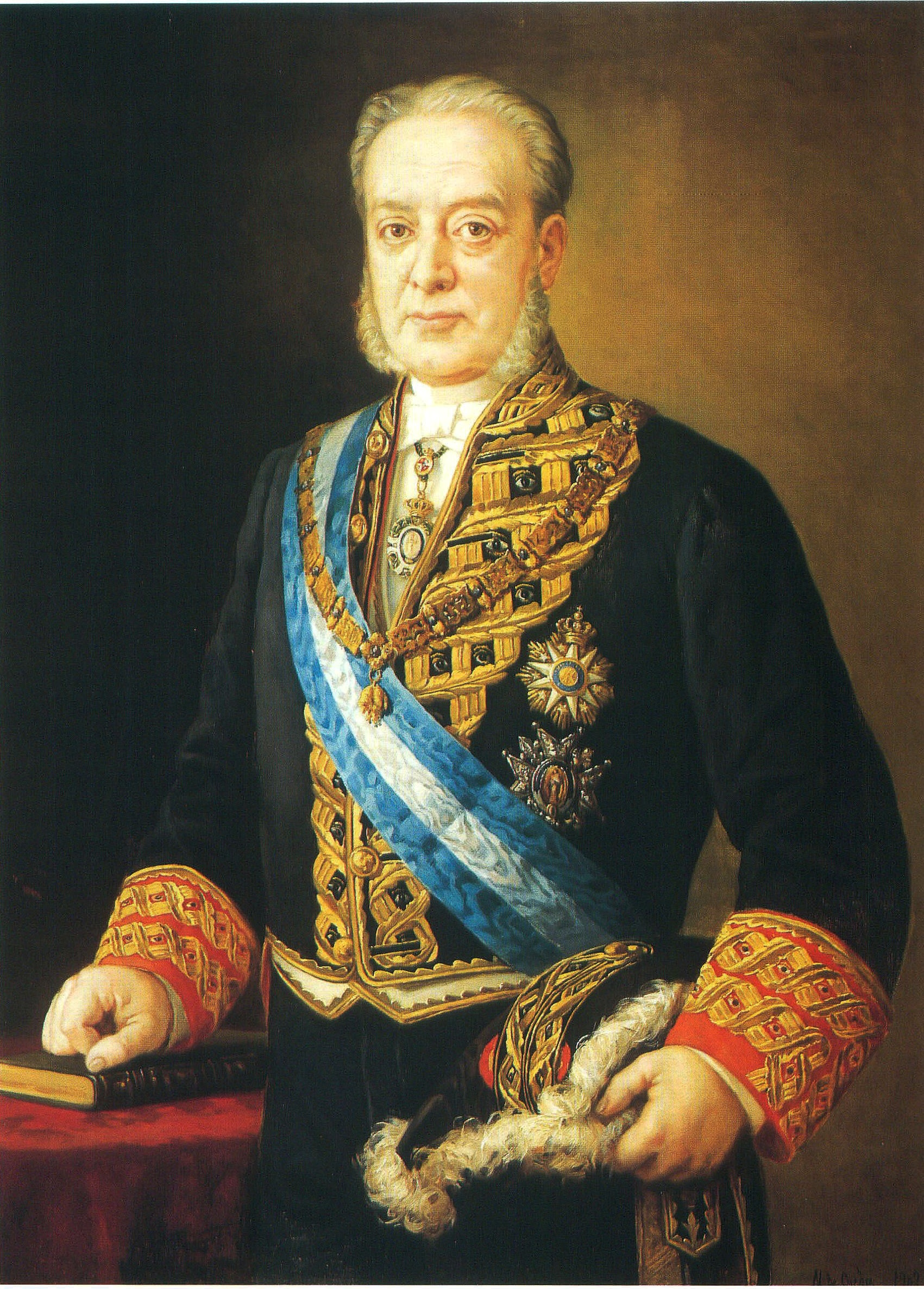
- Portrait of Aguirre de Tejada

Minister of Overseas
- In office 18 January 1884 – 27 November 1885
- Monarch: Alfonso XII
- Preceded by: Estanislao Suárez Inclán
- Succeeded by: Germán Gamazo

Minister of Grace and Justice
- In office 14 December 1895 – 4 October 1897
- Monarch: Alfonso XIII
- Preceded by: Francisco Romero Robledo
- Succeeded by: Alejandro Groizard y Gómez de la Serna

Governor of the Bank of Spain
- In office 1895–1895

President of the Tribunal de lo Contencioso Administrativo
- In office 1890–1890

Personal details
- Born: 28 December 1827 Ferrol, Galicia, Spain
- Died: 9 April 1911 (aged 83)
- Party: Unión Liberal, Conservative Party
- Education: University of Madrid
- Occupation: Politician, Lawyer

Manuel Aguirre de Tejada, 1st Count of Tejada de Valdosera (28 December 1827, Ferrol, Galicia – 9 April 1911) was a Spanish politician and lawyer.

He was minister of overseas during the reign of Alfonso XII, and Minister of Justice during the regency of Maria Christina of Austria.

After receiving a law degree from the University of Madrid, he travelled to Cuba in 1854 where he remained until the elections of 1857, when he was chosen deputy by La Coruña (province) representing the Unión Liberal. He successively retained this position in the elections of 1858, 1863 and 1865. In 1876 he was chosen as senator in La Coruna, named life senator the following year and later senator by Own Right in 1903.

After the Revolution of 1868 he became involved in the Conservative Party and was one of the commissioned members who wrote up the Constitution of 1876. Aguirre de Tejada was Foreign Minister from 18 January 1884 to 27 November 1885, and Minister of Justice between 14 December 1895 and 4 October 1897.

He was also president of the Tribunal de lo Contencioso Administrativo (Court of the Contentious Office staff) (1890) and Governor of the Bank of Spain (1895). He died on 9 April 1911.
