= Eugenio de Llaguno y Amírola =

Spanish politician and writer

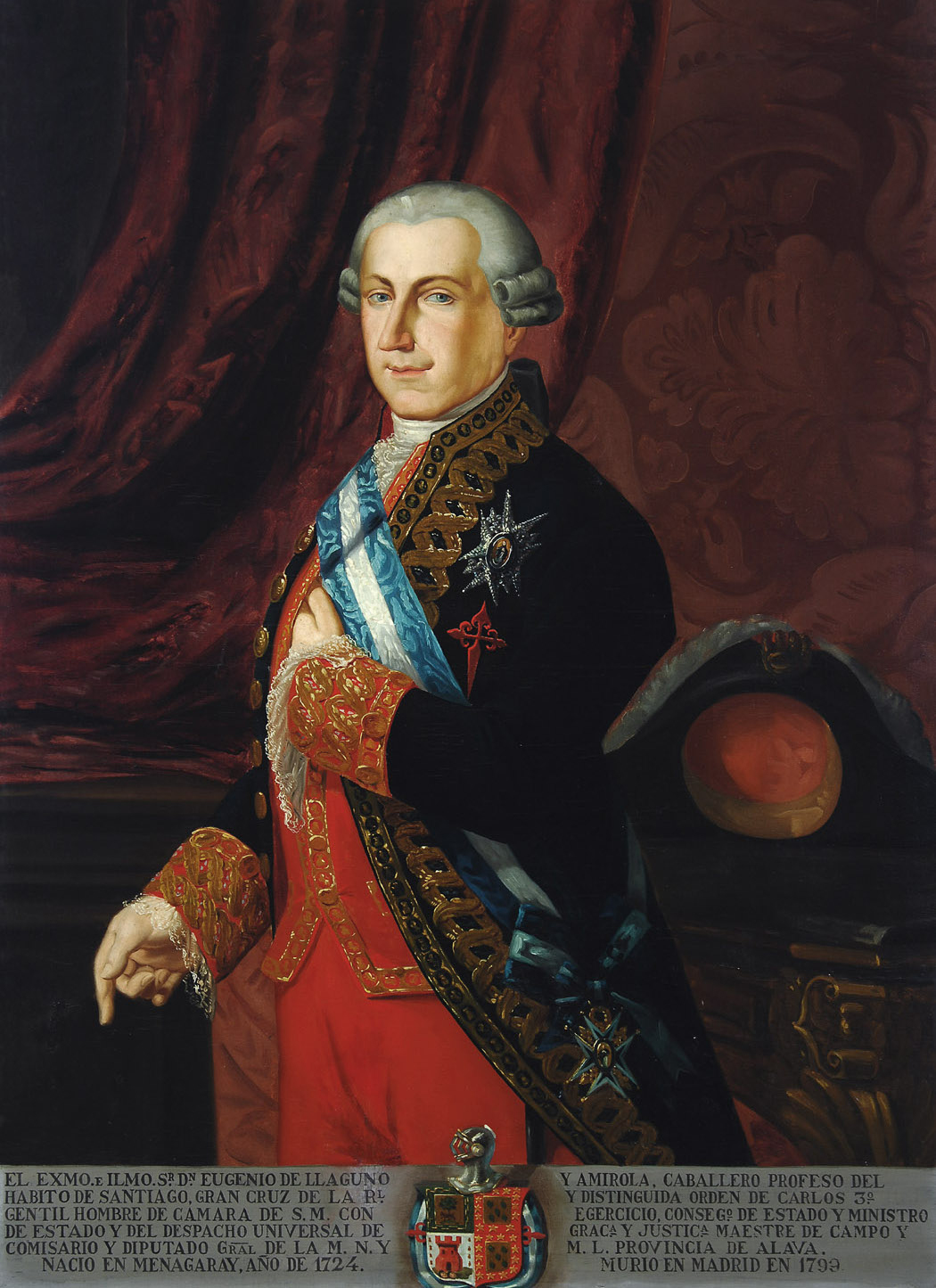
Eugenio de Llaguno y Amírola

Eugenio de Llaguno y Amírola (15 October 1724 – 10 February 1799) was a Spanish politician and writer.

== Biography ==
He was born in the Mendieta neighborhood of Menagarai, in Ayala/Aiara in the Basque Country. His father, Juan Andrés de Llaguno Fernández de Jauregi was a builder of churches. By around 1743, he was in Madrid under the guardianship of his uncle, Agustín de Montiano y Luyando, who served as director of the Royal Academy of History and secretary of the Chamber of Castile.

During the reign of Charles III, he served as an official in the Secretariat of the Chamber and State of Castile for Grace and Justice. Furthermore, he held the position of mayor of Menagarai in 1754. In 1764, he commissioned the painter Ginés Andrés de Aguirre to create a canvas depicting Saint Peter healing the lame man; the painting still hangs today on the main altarpiece of the Church of San Pedro in Menagarai. The same artist also painted a portrait of Eugenio de Llaguno in 1765. Additionally, in 1789, Llaguno published a corrected and expanded second (posthumous) edition of the famous Poética (Poetics) by the neoclassical writer Ignacio de Luzán, a work of great significance for its role in promoting the aesthetics of Neoclassicism. It is even believed that these additions and corrections may have been the work of Llaguno himself.

During the reign of Charles IV, beginning in 1792, he also served as a "political tutor" to Manuel Godoy, a role for which he was well-suited given his extensive experience in the field. Knight of the Order of Santiago (1758), King of Arms of the Illustrious Order of the Golden Fleece (1781), Secretary of the Council of State and of the Supreme Junta of State (1787), , Member of the Order of Charles III (1795), and Councilor of the Supreme Council of State (1797).

The province of Álava named him Honorary Deputy General and "Father of the Province" (1794), in recognition of the services he had rendered to it.

Between 1794 and 1797, he was Minister of Grace and Justice.
He died on 10 February 1799, in Madrid, from pneumonia, leaving no descendants.
