= Manifesto of Manzanares =

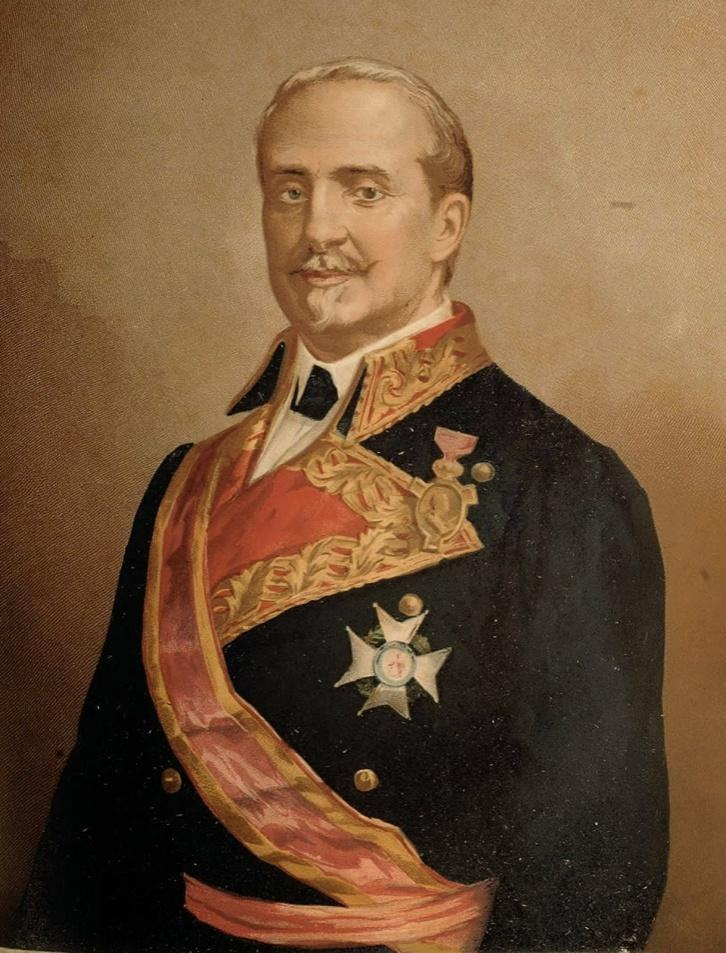
General Leopoldo O'Donnell

The Manifesto of Manzanares (Spanish: Manifiesto de Manzanares) was issued 7 July 1854 in Manzanares, Spain. Drafted by Antonio Cánovas del Castillo and signed by General Leopoldo O'Donnell, it called for political reforms and a constituent Cortes to bring about an authentic "liberal regeneration".

In 1854, Spain was at the tail end of the década moderada, slightly over ten years of rule by the Moderate Party. In the last few years, the regime had become increasingly corrupt, and even many of those who were sympathetic to its overt political views had turned against it. On 28 June 1854 Leopoldo O'Donnell, General in Chief of the Constitutional Army, led a coup attempt known as La Vicalvarada, which ended indecisively. He and his forces had moved south to Manzanares, Ciudad Real, where they reconnoitered with other like-minded forces.

On 7 July 1854 O'Donnell issued a short manifesto drafted by the young Antonio Cánovas del Castillo, future architect of Spain's Bourbon Restoration of 1874. The manifesto called on all Spaniards to preserve the Throne but to get rid of the current government. It reflected the politics of the Progressive Party. In its entirety it reads:

Spaniards: The enthusiastic reception that the liberal Army has encountered in the towns; the efforts of the soldiers who make it up, so heroically shown on the fields of Vicálvaro; the applause with which the news of our patriotic uprising has everywhere been received, now assure the triumph of liberty and laws that we have sworn to defend.

Within the last few days, the greater part of the provinces have thrown off the yoke of the tyrants; the entire Army has come to place itself under our banners, which are those of loyalty; the nation will enjoy the benefits of a representative regime, for which until now so much useless blood has been shed and so many costly sacrifices made. The day has come, it seems, to say what we are resolved to do on the day of victory.

We wish to preserve the Throne, but without the camarilla that dishonors it; we wish the rigorous practice of the fundamental laws, above all those of elections and the press; we wish to reduce taxes, based on a strict economy; we wish seniority and merit to be respected in civil and military employment; we wish to lift from the populations the centralization that is devouring them, giving them the local independence necessary to conserve and augment their own interests; and as a guarantee of all that we wish and to place ourselves on a solid basis, the National Militia. These are our intentions, which we express frankly without imposing these on the Nation.

The organs of government that ought to be constituted in free provinces, the Cortes generales that will later bring them together, the Nation itself, finally, will set the definitive bases for the liberal regeneration to which we aspire. We have consecrated our swords to the national will, and will not sheathe them until that will is satisfied.

General Barracks, Manzanares, 6 July 1854.

General in Chief of the Constitutional Army, Leopoldo O'Donnell, Count of Lucena.

The country heeded the call, and within weeks the Moderate government had fallen, ushering in the bienio progresista.
