= Francisco Javier González de Castejón y Elío, 8th Marquis of Vadillo =

Spanish lawyer and politician

The Marquis of Vadillo
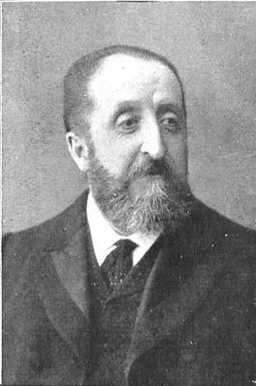

Minister of Grace and Justice
- In office 18 April 1900 – 6 March 1901
- Preceded by: Luis María de la Torre y de la Hoz
- Succeeded by: Julián García-San Miguel
- In office 27 October 1913 – 7 September 1914
- Preceded by: Pedro Rodríguez de la Borbolla
- Succeeded by: Eduardo Dato

Minister of Development
- In office 6 December 1902 – 20 July 1903
- Preceded by: Amós Salvador Rodrigáñez
- Succeeded by: Rafael Gasset Chinchilla
- In office 27 January 1905 – 23 July 1905
- Preceded by: José de Cárdenas Uriarte
- Succeeded by: Álvaro de Figueroa

Minister of the Interior
- In office 16 December 1904 – 27 January 1905
- Preceded by: Manuel Allendesalazar y Muñoz de Salazar
- Succeeded by: Augusto González Besada

Personal details
- Born: 25 May 1848 Pamplona, Spain
- Died: 25 November 1919 (aged 71) Madrid, Spain
- Party: Catholic Union; Conservative Party
- Occupation: Lawyer, politician

Francisco Javier González de Castejón y Elío, 8th Marquis of Vadillo (25 May 1848 - 25 November 1919) was a Spanish lawyer and politician who served as minister of Justice during the regency of Maria Christina of Austria, and served as minister of Development and minister of the Interior during the reign of Alfonso XIII. He also served as the Solicitor General of Spain.

== Biography ==
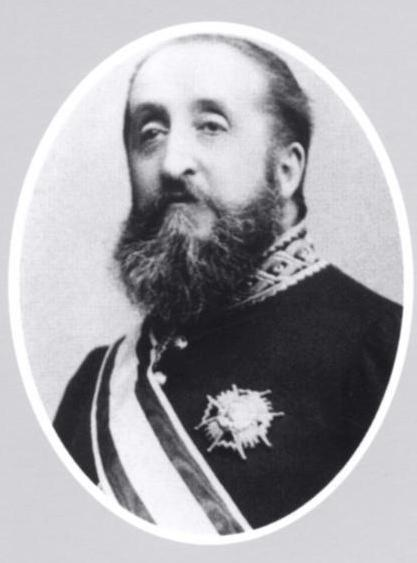
Portrait of González de Elío

He was born on 25 May 1848 in Pamplona. He was the firstborn child of Pedro González de Castejón y González de Castejón, 7th Marquess of Vadillo, and Manuela Elío y Mencos. After the death of his father in 1878, he inherited the marquessate and, in 1915, he also succeeded to the other two family titles: the Viscounty of Arberoa (1455) and the Barony of Beorlegui (1391).

He was a professor of natural law at the Complutense University of Madrid. A member of the Catholic Union and the Conservative Party, he began his political career as a representative for Navarre in the 1879 elections, he was reelected several times until 1914, he resigned in 1915 and was appointed senator for life.

He served as Minister of Justice between 18 April 1900 and 6 March 1901 during the premierships of Silvela and Azcarraga, he served again between 27 October 1913 and 7 September 1914 during the premiership of Dato. He served as Minister of Development from 6 December 1902 to 20 July 1903 and from 27 January to 23 June 1905. He was also Minister of the Interior from 16 December 1904 to 27 January 1905.

He was a member of the Royal Academy of Jurisprudence and Legislation and of the Academy of Moral and Political Sciences.

== Orders ==
- Knight Grand Cross of the Order of Isabella the Catholic. (Kingdom of Spain)
- Knight Grand Cross of the Order of St. Gregory the Great. (Holy See)
- Knight Grand Cross of the Order of Saint Michael. (Kingdom of Bavaria)

== Bibliography ==
- Vázquez de Prada Tiffé, Mercedes (1991). "El Marqués de Vadillo, figura clave del Partido Conservador en Navarra". Estudios de historia moderna y contemporánea: Homenaje a Federico Suárez Verdeguer. Madrid: Ediciones Rialp: 469–480. ISBN 84-321-2748-5. Archived from the original on 20 December 2016.
