= Saturnino Álvarez Bugallal =

Spanish lawyer, journalist and politician

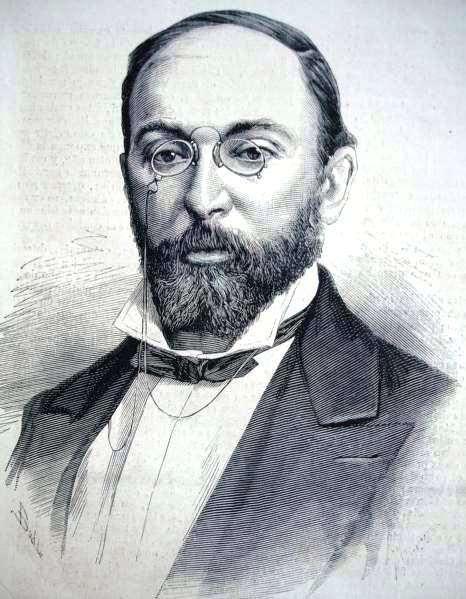
Saturnino Álvarez Bugallal

Saturnino Álvarez Bugallal (February 11, 1834 in Ponteareas – May 30, 1885) was a Spanish lawyer, journalist and politician.

He was Minister of Justice during the reign of Alfonso XII of Spain. He was a deputy in Congress on for Ourense (province) and Pontevedra (province) and elected in most of the elections between 1858 and 1884, as senator for Ourense in 1884. He was Minister of Justice on two occasions: between 6 January and 7 March 1879, and between 9 December 1879 and 8 February 1881 in individual governments presided over by Antonio Cánovas del Castillo. He also served as Prosecutor of the Supreme Court (1875–1877) and died on May 30, 1885.
