= José Canalejas =

José Canalejas may refer to:

- José Canalejas y Casas (1827–1902), Spanish politician and engineer
- José Canalejas y Méndez (1854–1912), Spanish politician who served as Prime Minister of Spain
- José Canalejas (actor) (1925–2015), Spanish actor
