= José de Castro y Orozco =

Spanish poet, playwright and politician

José de Castro y Orozco, 3rd Marquess of Gerona (1808 in Granada – 1869 in Madrid) was a Spanish aristocrat, politician, poet and playwright whose literary work is associated with the Romantic movement. He was a senator for life from 1853, and briefly Minister of Justice in 1853.
