= Pascual Amat y Esteve =

Spanish politician, military figure and lawyer

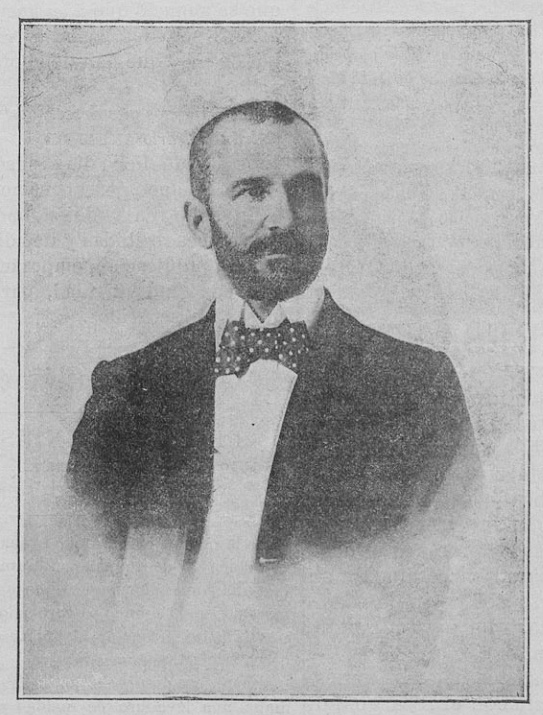
Pascual Amat y Esteve

Pascual Amat y Esteve (October 20, 1856 – August 10, 1928) was a Spanish politician, military figure and lawyer.

Born in Yecla, he was Minister of Justice of Spain during the reign of Alfonso XIII. He initiated his political career by joining the Liberal Fusionist Party, participating in the elections of 1893 to 1898 and successfully becoming deputy to Congress for Avila (province). In 1899 he joined the Conservative Party again representing Avila after the elections celebrated between 1903 and 1914 and then in 1916 representing the party in the Spanish Senate. Between 1918 and 1923 he returned to the Congress and again became senator in 1923. He served as Minister of Justice between 20 July and 12 December 1919 in a government presided over by Joaquín Sánchez de Toca Calvo.

He died in Madrid on August 10, 1928.
