= Luis Mayans y Enríquez de Navarra =

Spanish noble and politician (1805–1880)

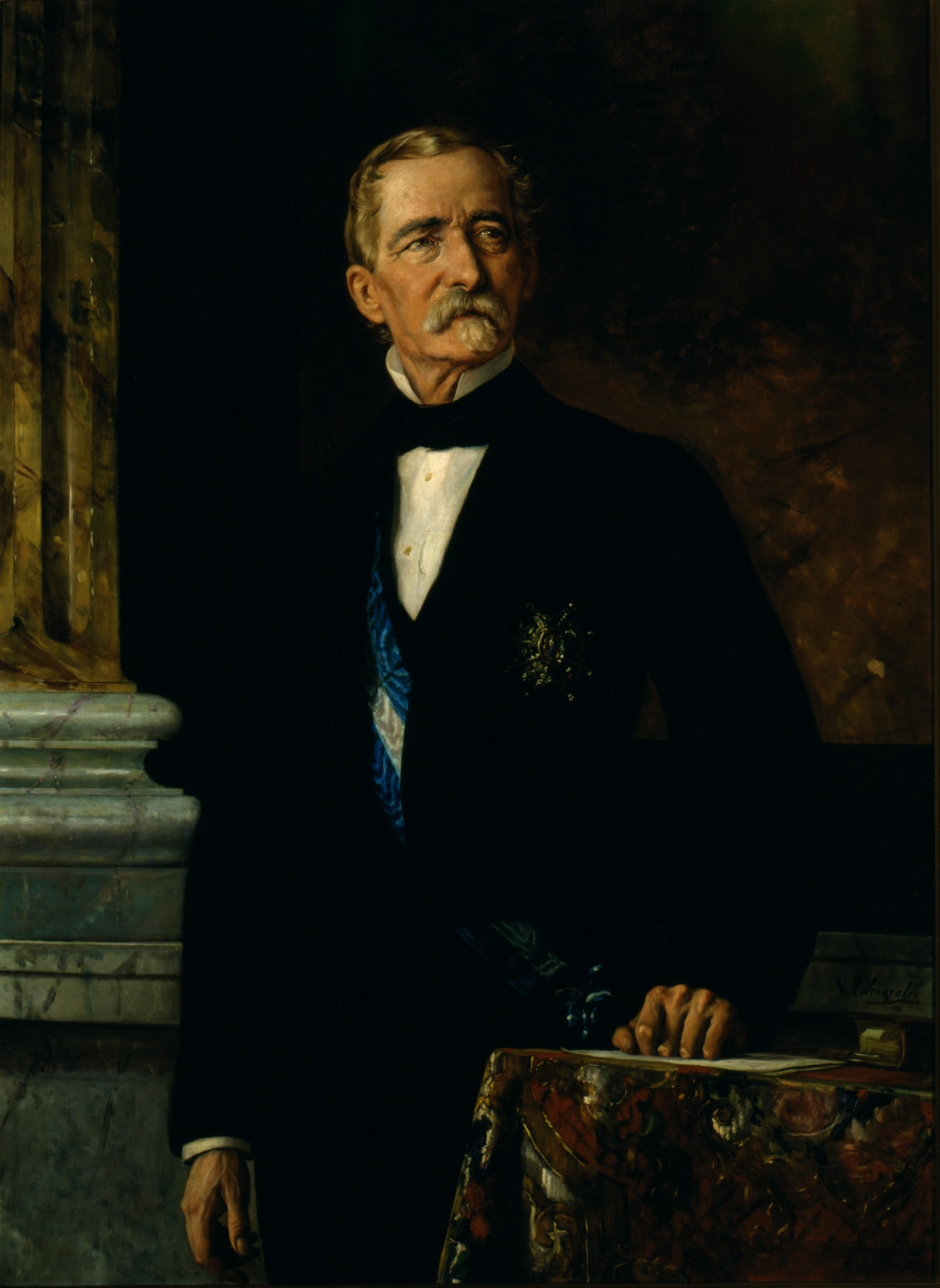
Don Luis Mayans

Luis Mayans y Enríquez de Navarra (22 July 1805 in Requena, Valencia – 14 September 1880 in Madrid) was a Spanish noble and politician who served as Minister of State in 1854 and President of the Congress of Deputies between 1848 and 1852.

Political offices
Preceded by Ángel Calderón de la Barca	Minister of State; 18 July 1854 – 20 July 1854	Succeeded by Joaquín Francisco Pacheco
