= Eduardo Alonso Colmenares =

Spanish lawyer, judge, and politician

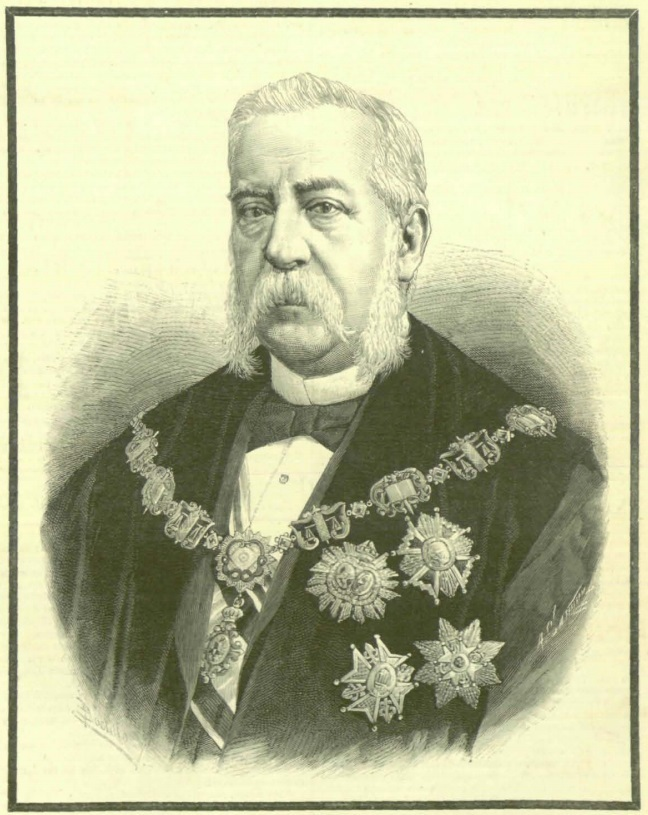

Minister of Justice
- In office 5 October 1871 – 26 May 1872
- Monarch: Amadeo I

Minister of Public Works and the Economy

Minister of Justice
- In office 3 September 1874 – 31 December 1874

Personal details
- Born: 13 October 1820 Corella, Navarre, Spain
- Died: 31 March 1888 (aged 67)
- Occupation: Lawyer, Judge, Politician

Eduardo Alonso Colmenares (13 October 1820 – 31 March 1888) was a Spanish lawyer, judge and politician. He was Minister of Justice during the reign of Amadeo I, later becoming Minister of Public Works and the Economy during the First Spanish Republic.

== Biography ==
Born in Corella on 13 October 1820, after qualifying in law in Madrid he practised law there and in Pamplona after which he became a judge and public prosecutor in the Courts of Seville, Barcelona and Granada until in 1859 when he moved to the Spanish colonies in the Caribbean. He served as a judge in Havana, Cuba and Santo Domingo, Dominican Republic and Chief quartermaster in Cuba.

With the Revolution of 1868, he returned to Spain and became active in politics, and was chosen deputy in Congress by the circumscription of Navarre Province in the elections of 1871, returning to be chosen in the elections of 1872 for Logroño (province) too.

Later, in 1877, he would become a life senator of the Senate. Alonso Colmenares was Minister of Justice between 5 October 1871 and 26 May 1872 in the governments of Jose Malcampo and Monge and Práxedes Mateo Sagasta. Later, and again under the presidency of Sagasta, he served again as Minister of Justice of Spain between 3 September and the 31 December 1874.

He died on 31 March 1888.
