= José García de León y Pizarro =

Spanish politician

The Most Excellent José García de León
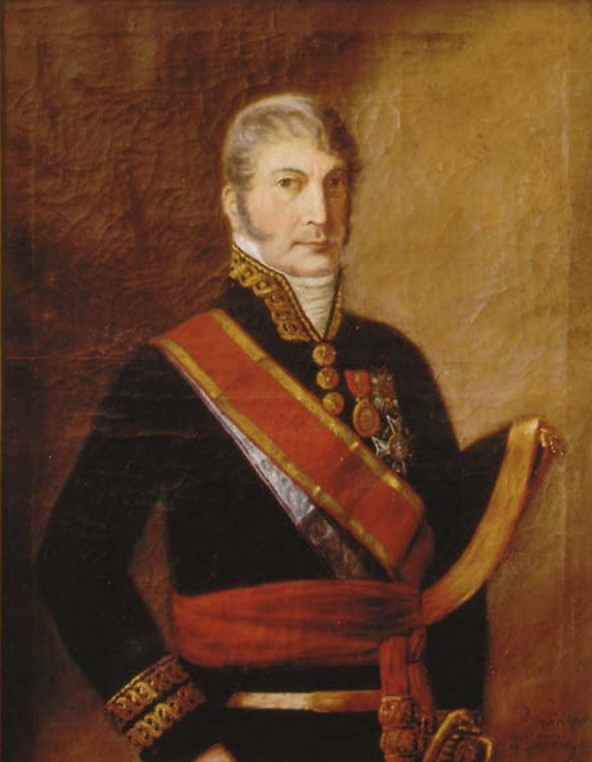

Prime Minister of Spain
- In office 30 October 1816 – 14 September 1818
- Monarch: Ferdinand VI
- Preceded by: Pedro Cevallos Guerra
- Succeeded by: Carlos Martínez de Irujo

Personal details
- Born: José García de León y Pizarro; 19 October 1770 Madrid, Spain
- Died: 27 January 1835 (aged 64) Madrid, Spain

José García de León y Pizarro (19 October 1770 in Madrid – 1835 in Madrid) was Minister of State (First Secretary of State) of Spain from 30 October 1816 to 14 September 1818. He married Maria Mercedes Avila and had a son, Rafael Garcia. He was a member of the Senate as a Hero of the Kingdom from 1834 to 1835. Prior to this, he briefly emigrated and settled in France from 1823 to 1830 after he was exiled.
