= Antonio Cánovas del Castillo =

Spanish politician and Bourbon Restoration architect (1828–1897)

The Most Excellent Antonio Cánovas del Castillo
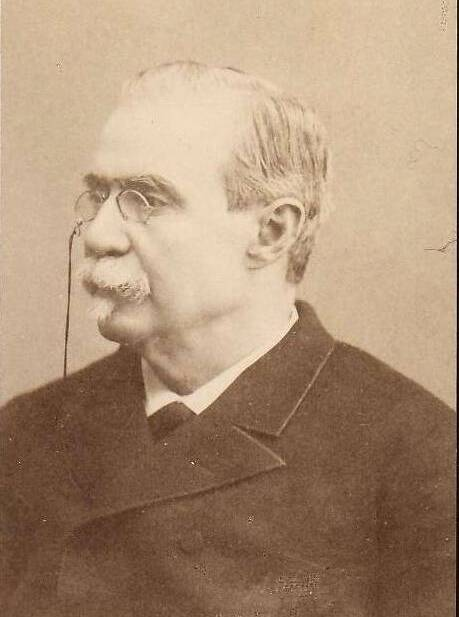

Prime Minister of Spain
- In office 24 March 1895 – 8 August 1897
- Monarch: Alfonso XIII
- Regent: Maria Christina of Austria
- Preceded by: Práxedes Mateo Sagasta
- Succeeded by: Marcelo Azcárraga
- In office 8 July 1890 – 13 December 1892
- Monarch: Alfonso XIII
- Regent: Maria Christina of Austria
- Preceded by: Práxedes Mateo Sagasta
- Succeeded by: Práxedes Mateo Sagasta
- In office 20 January 1884 – 28 November 1885
- Monarch: Alfonso XII
- Regent: Maria Christina of Austria
- Preceded by: José Posada Herrera
- Succeeded by: Práxedes Mateo Sagasta
- In office 11 December 1879 – 10 February 1881
- Monarch: Alfonso XII
- Preceded by: Arsenio Martínez Campos
- Succeeded by: Práxedes Mateo Sagasta
- In office 3 December 1875 – 8 March 1879
- Monarch: Alfonso XII
- Preceded by: Joaquín Jovellar
- Succeeded by: Arsenio Martínez Campos
- In office 10 January 1875 – 12 September 1875
- Monarch: Alfonso XII
- Preceded by: Himself (as President of the Ministry-Regency)
- Succeeded by: Joaquín Jovellar

President of the Ministry-Regency
- In office 31 December 1874 – 10 January 1875
- Preceded by: Práxedes Mateo Sagasta; as Prime Minister; Francisco Serrano; as President
- Succeeded by: Himself; as Prime Minister; Alfonso XII; as King

President of the Congress of Deputies
- In office 26 December 1885 – 8 March 1886
- Monarch: Alfonso XIII
- Regent: Maria Christina of Austria
- Prime Minister: Práxedes Mateo Sagasta
- Preceded by: Francisco de Borja Quiepo
- Succeeded by: Cristino Martos y Balbí

Minister of State of Spain
- Interim; 20 January – 19 March 1880
- Monarch: Alfonso XII
- Prime Minister: Himself
- Preceded by: Francisco de Borja Queipo
- Succeeded by: Marquess of Pazo de la Merced

Minister of Governance of Spain
- In office 1 March – 16 September 1864
- Monarch: Isabella II
- Prime Minister: Alejandro Mon y Menéndez
- Preceded by: Antonio de Benavides y Fernández de Navarrete
- Succeeded by: Luis González Bravo

Minister of Finance of Spain
- Interim; 28 May – 10 July 1866
- Monarch: Isabella II
- Prime Minister: Leopoldo O'Donnell
- Preceded by: Manuel Alonso Martínez
- Succeeded by: Manuel García Barzanallana

Minister of Overseas of Spain
- In office 21 June 1865 – 10 July 1866
- Monarch: Isabella II
- Prime Minister: Leopoldo O'Donnell
- Preceded by: Manuel Seijas Lozano
- Succeeded by: Alejandro de Castro Casal

Minister of the Navy of Spain
- Interim; 9 February – 8 June 1875
- Monarch: Alfonso XII
- Prime Minister: Himself
- Preceded by: Mariano Roca de Togrores
- Succeeded by: Santiago Durán Lira

Under Secretary of the Governance
- Interim; 5 July 1890 – 23 November 1891
- Monarch: Alfonso XIII
- Regent: Maria Christina of Austria
- Prime Minister: Himself
- Preceded by: José María Beránger
- Succeeded by: Florencio Montojo y Trillo
- In office 22 August 1860 – 21 January 1863
- Monarch: Isabella II
- Prime Minister: Leopoldo O'Donnell
- Minister of Governance: José Posada Herrera
- Preceded by: Juan Lorenzana
- Succeeded by: Nicolás Suárez Cantón

Personal details
- Born: Antonio Cánovas del Castillo; 8 February 1828 Málaga, Spain
- Died: 8 August 1897 (aged 69) Mondragón, Spain
- Resting place: Pantheon of Illustrious Men
- Party: Conservative Party
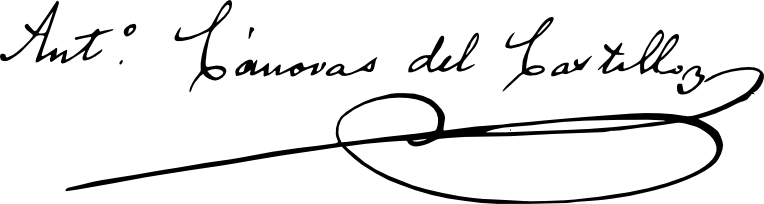
- Signature
- Nickname: El Monstruo

Antonio Cánovas del Castillo (8 February 1828 – 8 August 1897) was a Spanish politician and historian known principally for serving six terms as prime minister and his overarching role as "architect" of the regime that ensued with the 1874 restoration of the Bourbon monarchy. He was assassinated by Italian anarchist Michele Angiolillo.

As leader of the Liberal-Conservative Party—also known more simply as the Conservative Party—the name of Cánovas became symbolic of the alternate succession in the Restoration regime along with Práxedes Mateo Sagasta's.

== Early career ==
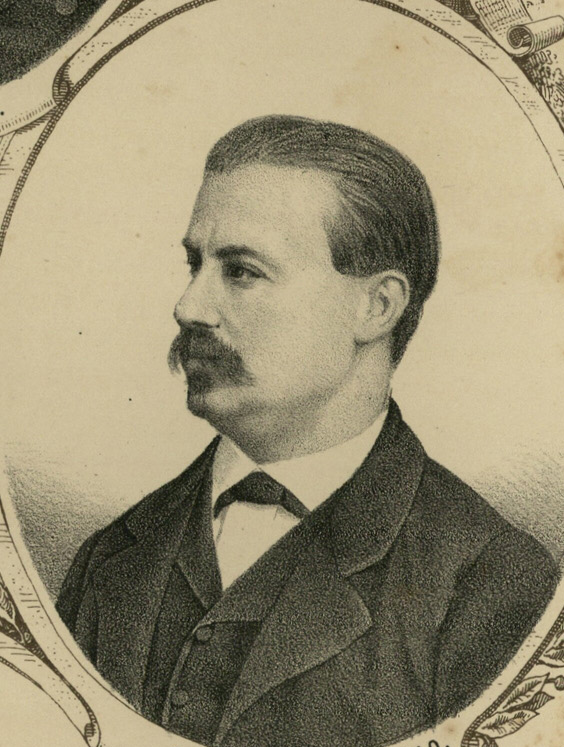
Portrait of Cánovas (c. 1869)

Born in Málaga as the son of Antonio Cánovas García and Juana del Castillo y Estébanez, Cánovas moved to Madrid after the death of his father where he lived with his mother's cousin, the writer Serafín Estébanez Calderón. Although he studied law at the University of Madrid, he showed an early interest in politics and Spanish history. His active involvement in politics dates to the 1854 revolution, led by General Leopoldo O'Donnell, when he drafted the Manifesto of Manzanares, which accompanied the military overthrow of the sitting government, laid out the political goals of the movement, and played a critical role as it attracted the masses' support when the coup seemed to fail. During the final years of Isabel II, he served in a number of posts, including a diplomatic mission to Rome, governor of Cádiz, and director general of local administration. That period of his political career culminated in his being twice made a government minister, first taking the interior portfolio in 1864 and then the overseas territories portfolio in 1865 to 1866. After the 1868 Glorious Revolution (Revolución Gloriosa), he retired from the government, but he was a strong supporter of the restoration of the Bourbon monarchy during the First Spanish Republic (1873–1874) and as the leader of the conservative minority in the Cortes, he declaimed against universal suffrage and freedom of religion. He also drafted the Manifesto of Sandhurst and prevailed upon Alfonso XII to issue it, just as he had done years previously with O'Donnell.

== Prime minister ==
Cánovas returned to active politics with the 1874 overthrow of the Republic by General Martínez Campos and the elevation of Isabell II's son Alfonso XII to the throne. He served as Prime Minister (Primer presidente del Consejo de Ministros) for six years starting in 1874 (although he was twice briefly replaced in 1875 and 1879). He was a principal author of the Spanish Constitution of 1876, which formalised the constitutional monarchy that had resulted from the restoration of Alfonso and limited suffrage to reduce the political influence of the working class and assuage the voting support from the wealthy minority becoming the protected status quo.

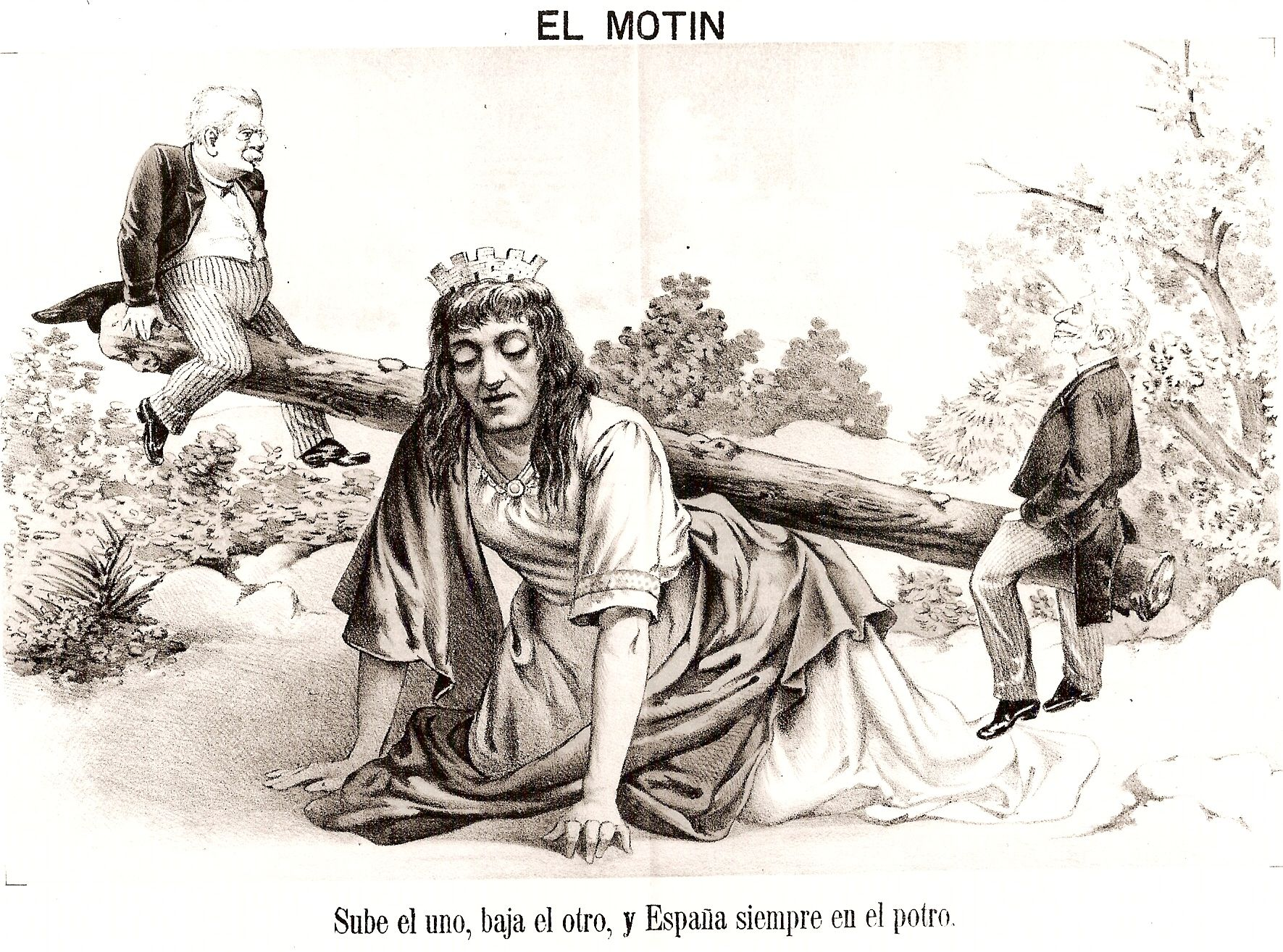
Cartoon in El Motín depicting Cánovas and Sagasta on a see-saw whose fulcrum is an allegory of Spain

Cánovas del Castillo played a key role in bringing an end to the last Carlist threat to Bourbon authority (1876) by merging a group of dissident Carlist deputies with his own Conservative party. More significantly, his term in office saw the victory achieved by the governmental Spanish troops in the Third Carlist War, the occupation of the Basque territory and the decree establishing an end to the centuries-long Basque specific status (July 1876) that resulted in its annexation to a centralist Spain. Against a backdrop of martial law imposed across the Basque Provinces (and possibly Navarre), heated negotiations with Liberal Basque high-ranking officials led to the establishment of the first Basque Economic Agreement (1878).

An artificial two-party system designed to reconcile the competing militarist, Catholic and Carlist power bases led to an alternating prime ministership (known as the turno pacifico) with the progressive Práxedes Mateo Sagasta after 1881. He also assumed the functions of the head of state during the regency of María Cristina after Alfonso's death in 1885.

== Political crisis ==
By the late 1880s, Cánovas' policies were under threat from two sources. First, his overseas policy was increasingly untenable. A policy of repression against Cuban nationalists was ultimately ineffective and Spain's authority was challenged most seriously by the 1895 rebellion led by José Martí. Spain's policy against Cuban independence brought her increasingly into conflict with the United States, an antagonism that culminated in the Spanish–American War of 1898. Second, the political repression of Spain's working class was growing increasingly troublesome, and pressure for expanded suffrage mounted amid widespread discontent with the cacique system of electoral manipulation.

Cánovas' policies included mass arrests and a policy of torture:

During a religious procession in 1896, at Barcelona, a bomb was thrown. Immediately three hundred men and women were arrested. Some were Anarchists, but the majority were trade unionists and Socialists. They were thrown into the notorious prison at the fortress of Montjuïc in Barcelona and tortured. After a number had been killed, or had gone insane, their cases were taken up by the liberal press of Europe, resulting in the release of a few survivors. Reputedly it was Cánovas del Castillo who ordered the torture, including the burning of the victims' flesh, the crushing of their bones, and the cutting out of their tongues. Similar acts of brutality and barbarism had occurred during his regime in Cuba, and Canovas remained deaf to the appeals and protests of civilized conscience.

His attempts to stabilize Spain's parliamentary system achieved a measure of success until World War I in which Spain was not spared the disturbances that ravaged much of the European continent. According to some views, his regime was a welcomed change from Spanish liberalism, considered by some to deny equal participation to political rivals. The restored parliamentary monarchy recognized the principle of allowing rival political opponents within the framework of a constitution. Yet, it would be decades before universal male suffrage and other typical characteristics of modern democratic systems were implemented; it was still very much an electoral system dominated by parties of established local elites.

== Man of letters ==
At the same time, Cánovas remained an active man of letters. His historical writings earned him a considerable reputation, particularly his History of the Decline of Spain (Historia de la decadencia de España) for which he was elected at the young age of 32 to the Real Academia de la Historia in 1860. That was followed by elevation to other bodies of letters, including the Real Academia Española in 1867, the Academia de Ciencias Morales y Políticas in 1871 and the Real Academia de Bellas Artes de San Fernando in 1887. He also served as the head of the Athenaeum in Madrid (1870–74, 1882–84 and 1888–89).

== Assassination ==
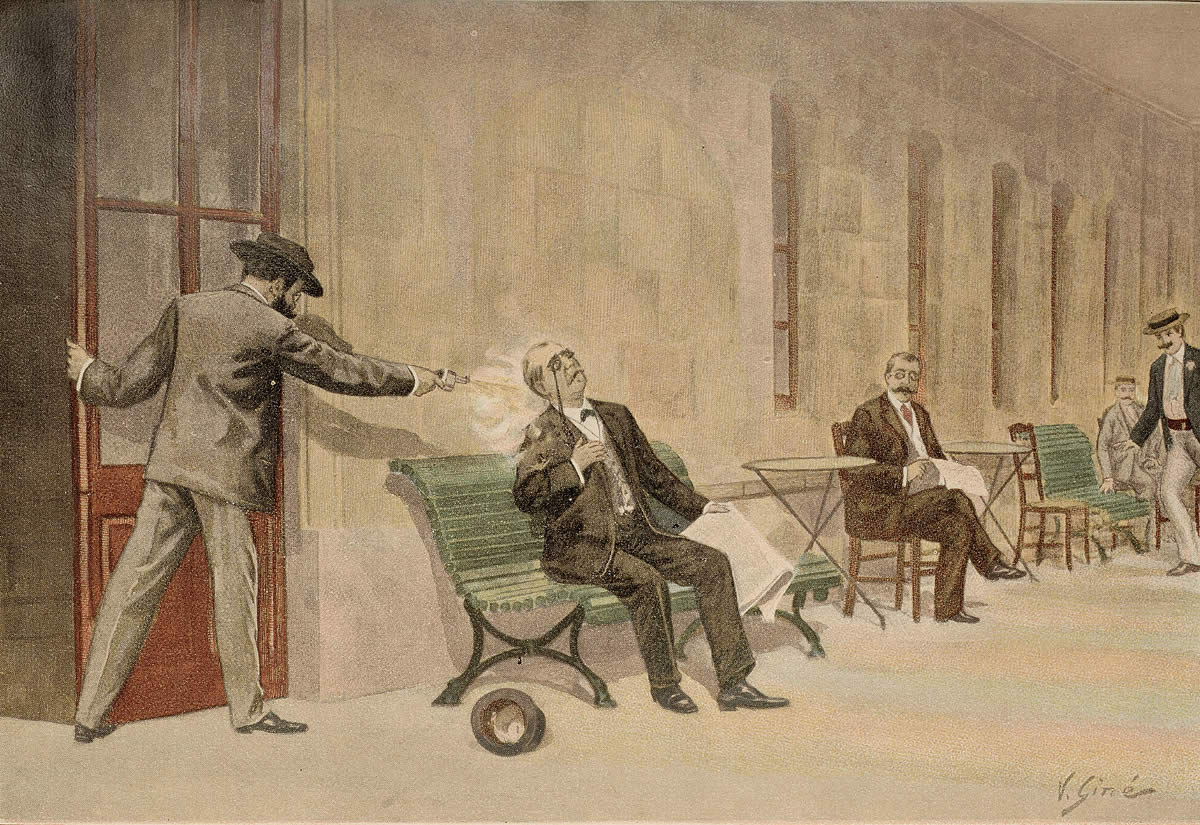
Assassination of Antonio Cánovas del Castillo on 8 August 1897, Mondragón.

In 1897, he was shot dead by Michele Angiolillo, an Italian anarchist, at the spa Santa Águeda, in Mondragón, Guipúzcoa. Angiolillo invoked vengeance on Canovas on behalf of the execution of Jose Rizal and other Barcelona anarchists. He thus did not live to see Spain's loss of her final colonies to the United States after the Spanish–American War.

== Personal life ==
He married María de la Concepción Espinosa de los Monteros y Rodrigo de Villamayor on 20 October 1860; he was widowed on 3 September 1863. He married Joaquina de Osma y Zavala on 14 November 1887. No progeny survived him.

== Ideology and thought ==
Cánovas was the chief architect of the Restoration regime, that strived for bringing stability to the Spanish society. It has been emphasized that the two figures most influential to his political ideas were Edmund Burke (from whom he derived a brand of traditionalism with a historicist rather than religious matrix) and Joaquín Francisco Pacheco. Cánovas embraced an essentialist, metaphysical and providentialist conception of the nation. A staunch opponent to universal suffrage, he held the view that "universal suffrage begets socialism in a natural, necessary and inevitable way".

A supporter of slavery, he declared in November 1896 in a press interview: "Blacks in Cuba are free; they can enter into contracts, work or not work, and I think that slavery was much better than this freedom which they only took advantage of to do nothing and form masses of unemployed. Anyone who knows the blacks will tell you that in Madagascar, the Congo, as in Cuba, they are lazy, savage, prone to misbehavior, and that you have to lead them with authority and firmness to get anything out of them. These savages have no owner other than their own instincts, their primitive appetites".

In reference to his political and intellectual stature, Cánovas was nicknamed as el Monstruo ("The Monster") by his peers.

== Legacy ==
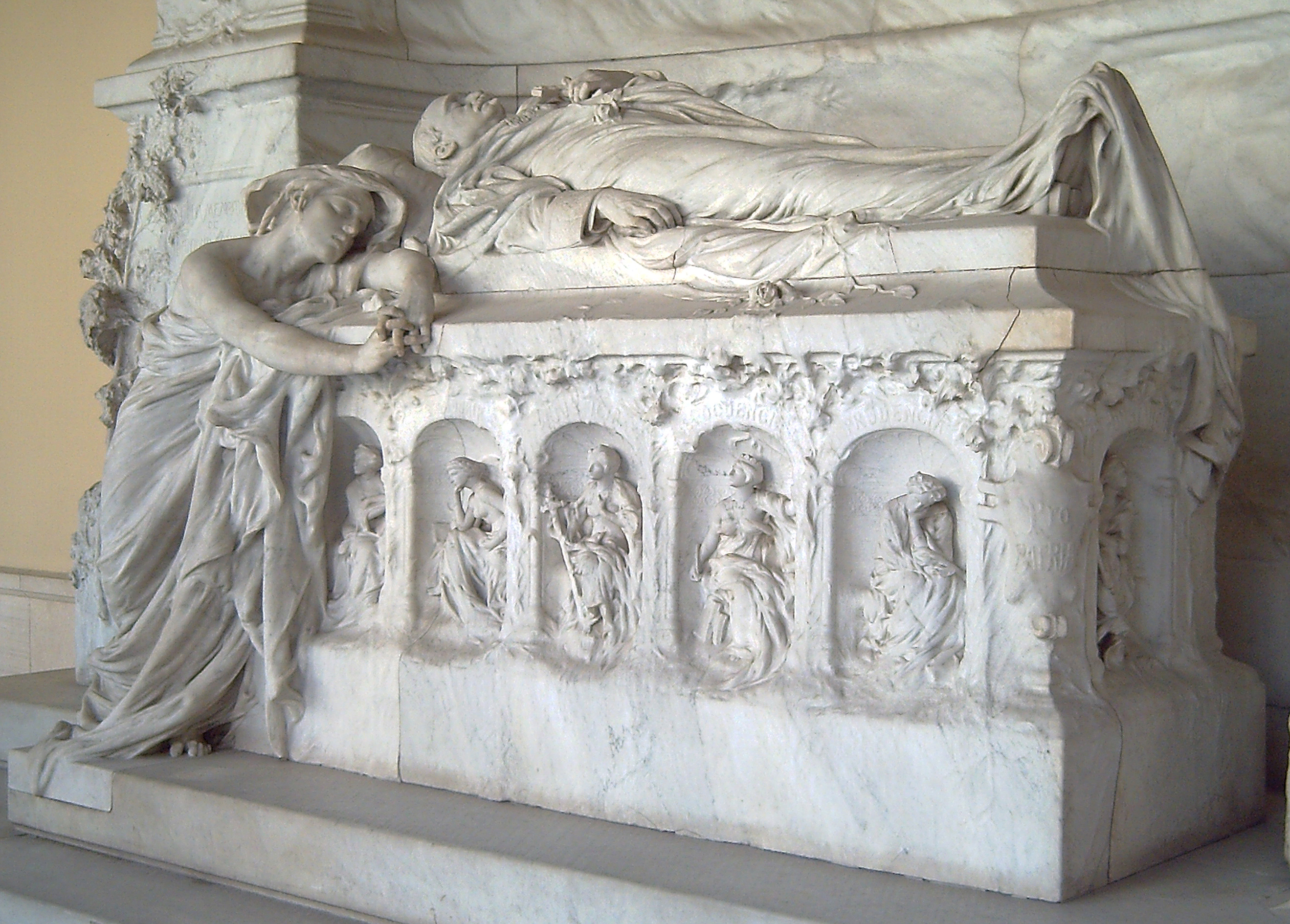
Cánovas's tomb at the Pantheon of Illustrious Men in Madrid

The policies of repression and political manipulation that Cánovas made a cornerstone of his government helped foster the nationalist movements in both Catalonia and the Basque provinces and set the stage for labour unrest during the first two decades of the 20th century. The disastrous colonial policy not only led to the loss of Spain's remaining colonial possessions in the Pacific and Caribbean but also seriously weakened the government at home. A failed postwar coup by Camilo de Polavieja set off a long period of political instability, which ultimately led to the collapse of the monarchy and the dissolution of the constitution that Cánovas had authored.

His white marble mausoleum was carved by Agustí Querol Subirats at the Pantheon of Illustrious Men, in Madrid.

== Arms ==

Political offices
Preceded by Antonio de Benavides	Minister of the Governation; 1864	Succeeded by Luis González Bravo
Preceded by Manuel Seijas Lozano	Minister of the Overseas; 1865–1866	Succeeded by Alejandro de Castro Casal
Preceded by Francisco Serrano as President	President of the Minister-Regency; 1874-1875	Succeeded by Alfonso XII as King of Spain
Preceded by Práxedes Mateo Sagasta	Prime Minister of Spain; 1875	Succeeded by Joaquín Jovellar Soler
Preceded by Joaquín Jovellar Soler	Prime Minister of Spain; 1875–1879	Succeeded by Arsenio Martínez-Campos Antón
Preceded by Arsenio Martínez-Campos Antón	Prime Minister of Spain; 1879–1881	Succeeded by Práxedes Mateo Sagasta
Preceded by José Posada Herrera	Prime Minister of Spain; 1884–1885	Succeeded by Práxedes Mateo Sagasta
Preceded by Francisco de Borja Queipo de Llano	President of the Congress of Deputies; 1885–1886	Succeeded by Cristino Martos Balbi
Preceded by Práxedes Mateo Sagasta	Prime Minister of Spain; 1890–1892	Succeeded by Práxedes Mateo Sagasta
Preceded by Práxedes Mateo Sagasta	Prime Minister of Spain; 1895–1897	Succeeded by Marcelo Azcárraga Palmero
Party political offices
Preceded by Party created	Leader of the Conservative Party; 1874–1897	Succeeded by Francisco Silvela
