= Francisco Silvela =

Spanish politician

The Most Excellent Francisco Silvela
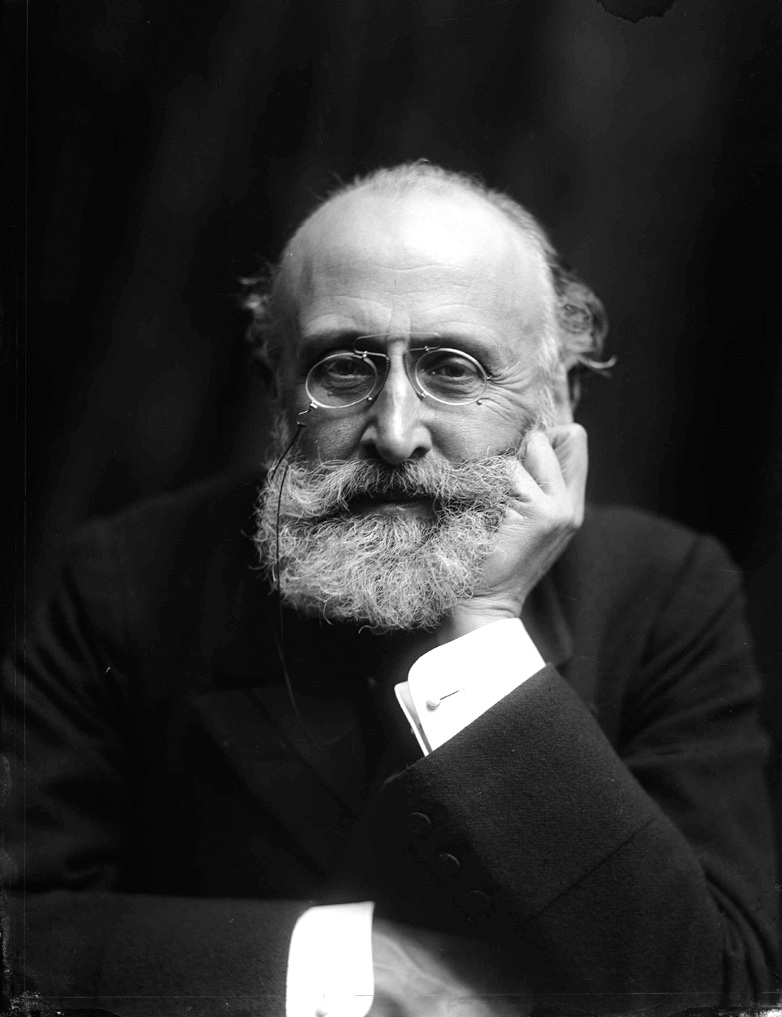
- Photograph by Kaulak

Prime Minister of Spain
- In office 6 December 1902 – 20 July 1903
- Monarch: Alfonso XIII
- Regent: Maria Christina of Austria
- Preceded by: Práxedes Sagasta
- Succeeded by: Raimundo Fernández-Villaverde
- In office 3 May 1899 – 22 October 1900
- Monarch: Alfonso XIII
- Regent: Maria Christina of Austria
- Preceded by: Práxedes Sagasta
- Succeeded by: Marcelo Azcárraga

Minister of Governance of Spain
- In office 7 March – 9 June 1879
- Monarch: Alfonso XII
- Prime Minister: Arsenio Martínez-Campos
- Preceded by: Francisco Romero Robledo
- Succeeded by: Francisco Romero Robledo
- In office 5 July 1890 – 23 November 1891
- Monarch: Alfonso XIII
- Regent: Maria Christina of Austria
- Prime Minister: Antonio Cánovas del Castillo
- Preceded by: Trinitario Ruiz Capdepón
- Succeeded by: José Elduayen Gorriti

Minister of State of Spain
- In office 4 March 1899 – 18 April 1900
- Monarch: Alfonso XIII
- Regent: Maria Christina of Austria
- Prime Minister: Himself
- Preceded by: Juan Manuel Sánchez
- Succeeded by: Ventura García-Sancho

Minister of Grace and Justice of Spain
- In office 18 January 1884 – 27 November 1885
- Monarch: Alfonso XII
- Regent: Maria Christina of Austria
- Prime Minister: Antonio Cánovas del Castillo
- Preceded by: Aureliano Linares Rivas
- Succeeded by: Manuel Alonso Martínez

Minister of the Navy of Spain
- In office 18 April – 23 October 1900
- Monarch: Alfonso XIII
- Regent: Maria Christina of Austria
- Prime Minister: Himself
- Preceded by: José Gómez-Imaz Simón
- Succeeded by: Marcelo Azcárraga Palmero

Under Secretary of the Governance
- In office 27 January – 13 July 1875
- Monarch: Alfonso XII
- Prime Minister: Antonio Cánovas del Castillo
- Minister of Governance: Francisco Romero Robledo
- Preceded by: Mariano Zacarías Cazurro y García
- Succeeded by: Francisco Barca Corral

Seat K of the Real Academia Española
- In office 30 April 1893 – 29 May 1905
- Preceded by: Mariano Roca de Togores
- Succeeded by: Cristóbal Pérez Pastor (Note: Pérez Pastor was elected for the position in 1905 but never took the seat)

Personal details
- Born: Francisco Silvela y Vielleuze; 15 December 1843 Madrid, Spain
- Died: 29 May 1905 (aged 61) Madrid, Spain

Francisco Silvela y Le Vielleuze (15 December 1843, in Madrid – 29 May 1905, in Madrid) was a Spanish politician who became Prime Minister of Spain on 3 May 1899, succeeding Práxedes Mateo Sagasta. He served in this capacity until 22 October 1900. Silvela also served a second term from 6 December 1902 to 20 July 1903, in which he succeeded another one of Práxedes Mateo Sagasta's many separate terms as prime minister.

Francisco Silvela belonged to the Conservative Party led by Antonio Cánovas del Castillo. He was a Deputy in Parliament continuously from 1876 to 1903, mostly representing Ávila, but for one term he served Pontevedra. He became leader of the Party after the assassination of Cánovas in 1897. His government concluded the German–Spanish Treaty (1899), selling the remainder of the Spanish East Indies.

Silvela named the general Arsenio Linares y Pombo, who had fought in the Spanish–American War, Minister of War in 1900. He withdrew from politics in 1903 and appointed Antonio Maura as his successor. He died in Madrid in 1905.

Silvela was elected to seat K of the Real Academia Española, he took up his seat on 30 April 1893.

== Family ==
Francisco Silvela married Amalia Loring y Heredia; their children were Jorge and Tomas.

Political offices
| Preceded by The Duke of Almodóvar del Río | Minister of State; 4 March 1899 – 18 April 1900 | Succeeded by The Marquis of Aguilar de Campoo |
