= Miguel García Cuesta =

His Eminence Miguel García Cuesta
- Archbishop of Santiago de Compostela
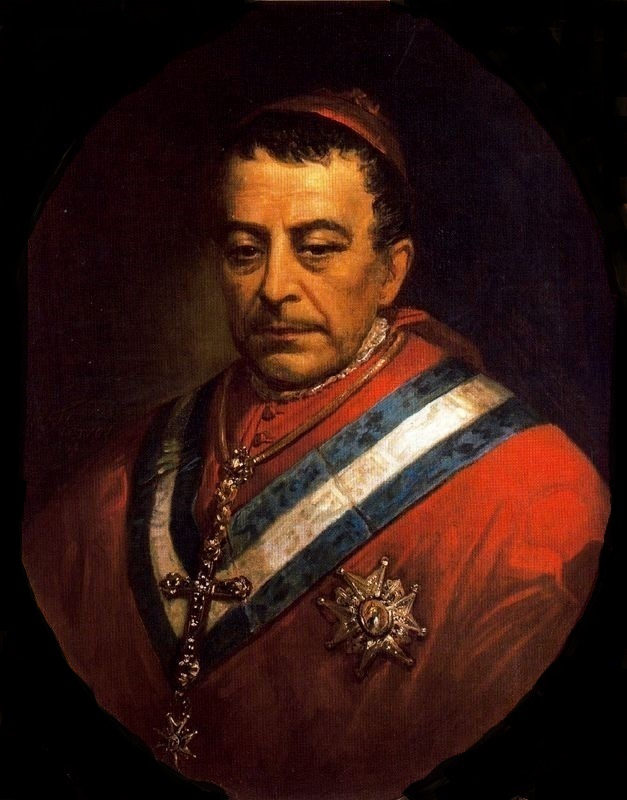
- Portrait - Dionisio Fierros.
- Church: Roman Catholic Church
- Archdiocese: Santiago de Compostela
- See: Santiago de Compostela
- Appointed: 5 September 1851
- Term ended: 18 April 1873
- Predecessor: Rafael Manuel José Benito de Vélez Téllez
- Successor: Miguel Payá y Rico
- Other post: Cardinal-Priest of Santa Prisca (1862-73)
- Previous post: Bishop of Jaca (1848-51)

Orders
- Ordination: 1 March 1828 by Agustín Lorenzo Varela Temes
- Consecration: 16 July 1848 by Juan Antonio Rivadeneyra
- Created cardinal: 27 September 1861 by Pope Pius IX
- Rank: Cardinal-Priest

Personal details
- Born: Miguel García Cuesta; 6 October 1803 Macotera, Kingdom of Spain
- Died: 18 April 1873 (aged 69) Santiago de Compostela, First Spanish Republic
- Buried: Santiago de Compostela Cathedral
- Parents: Francisco García Madrid; Isabel Cuesta Rubio
- Education: University of Salamanca

Miguel García Cuesta (6 October 1803 in Macotera – 18 April 1873 in Santiago de Compostela) was a professor at the University of Salamanca, Bishop of Jaca (1848), Archbishop of Santiago de Compostela (1851), Senator for Life (1851) and Cardinal (1861).

== Biography ==
In 1815, at the age of twelve, he left his native village with his uncle, who was the chaplain of the Sanctuary of the Virgin of Valdejimena in Horcajo Medianero. Three years later, he was enrolled at the seminary in Salamanca, where he studied philosophy and theology and became a substitute professor of mathematics. He took his bachelor's degree from the University of Salamanca.

In 1825, he received the four minor orders and a subdeaconate. The following year, he was ordained a deacon and was named a professor of philosophy at the University. In 1828, he became a presbyter and obtained his doctorate in Holy Scripture. He was also a professor at the seminary and later became its rector.

In 1848, he was named Bishop of Jaca and, in 1851, was promoted to Archbishop of Santiago de Compostela. Queen Isabella II made him a Senator for Life and awarded him the Order of Charles III.

At the request of Pope Pius IX, he participated in the preparatory acts and the declaration of the dogmatic definition for the Immaculate Conception, after which the Pope created him a Cardinal with the titular church of Santa Prisca.

He was chosen as a deputy to the Cortes Constituyentes de 1869, where he defended the established Catholic Confessionalism of the Kingdom of Spain. This led to a dispute with the Provisional Government that prevented him from attending the First Vatican Council. Later, he was elected a senator from the Province of Vizcaya. A year before his death, he presided over the consecration of the central cupolas at the Basílica del Pilar.

He died at the Archbishop's Palace in Santiago de Compostela, and is interred in the Pantheon of Archbishops at the Metropolitan Cathedral.

== Sources ==
- Cardinals of the Holy Roman Church created by Pius IX @ Florida International University
- García Cuesta @ Catholic-Hierarchy.org
- Miguel García Cuesta @ the Spanish Senate website.
