= Tierra de Peñaranda =

Coordinates: 40°53′23″N 5°14′45″W

- Comarca
- Location in Salamanca
- Country: Spain
- Autonomous community: Castile and León
- Province: Salamanca

Area
  - Total: 597.45 km^{2} (230.68 sq mi)

Population (2014)
  - Total: 12,186
  - Density: 20.397/km^{2} (52.827/sq mi)
- Time zone: UTC+1 (CET)
  - Summer (DST): CEST

Tierra de Peñaranda is a comarca in the province of Salamanca, Castile and León. It contains 19 municipalities: Alaraz, Alconada, Aldeaseca de la Frontera, Bóveda del Río Almar, Cantaracillo, El Campo de Peñaranda, Macotera, Malpartida, Mancera de Abajo, Nava de Sotrobal, Paradinas de San Juan, Peñaranda de Bracamonte, Rágama, Salmoral, Santiago de la Puebla, Tordillos, Ventosa del Río Almar, Villar de Gallimazo, and Zorita de la Frontera.
