= Spanish Enlightenment =

Enlightenment movement in Spain

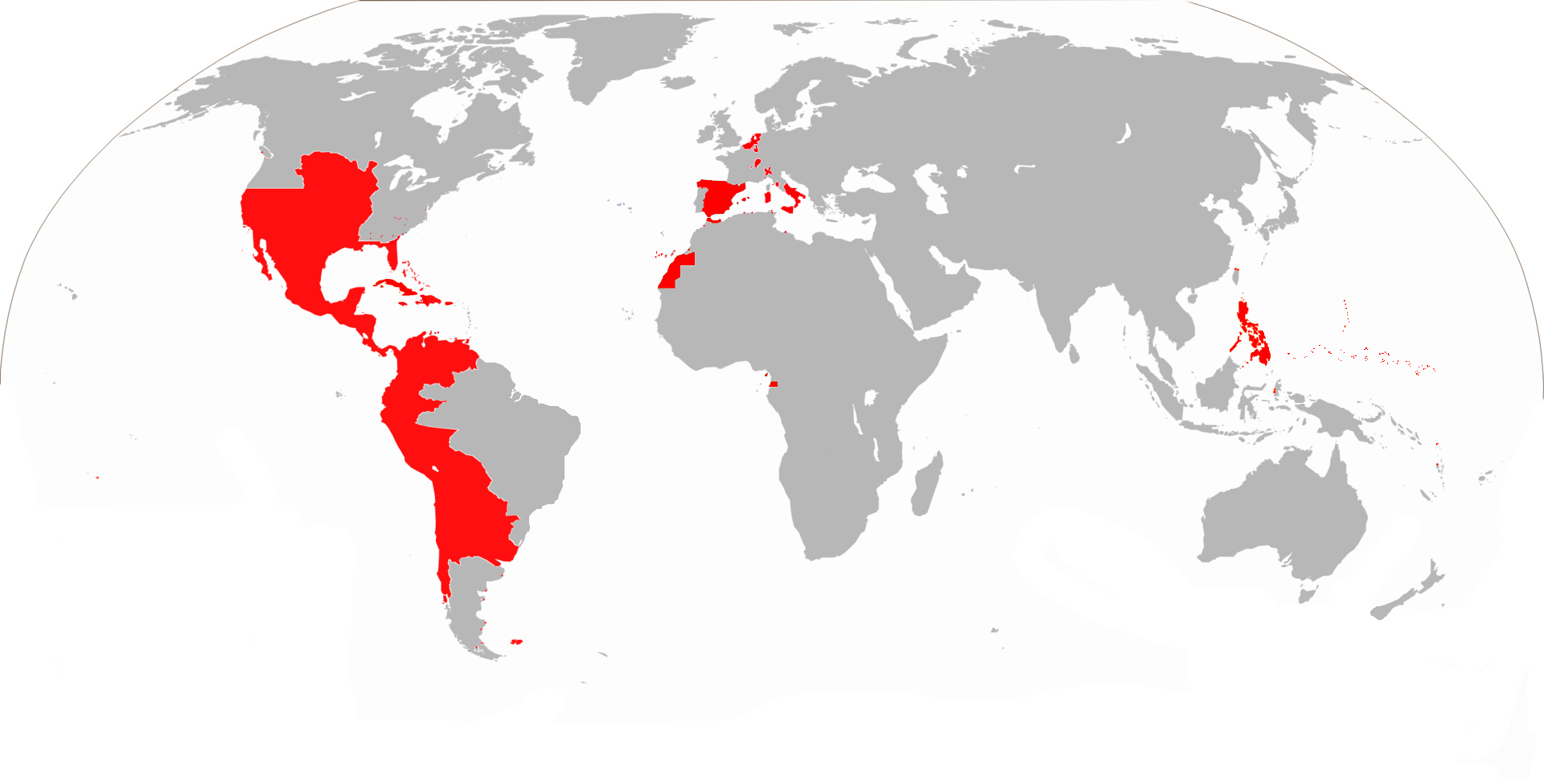
Map of the Spanish Empire

The Spanish Enlightenment (Spanish: la Ilustración española) was an 18th-century intellectual and cultural movement that was part of the broader Western Enlightenment.

The ideas of the Enlightenment came to Spain with the new Bourbon dynasty, following the death of the last Habsburg monarch, Charles II, in 1700. The period of reform and 'enlightened despotism' under the eighteenth-century Bourbons focused on centralizing the power of the Spanish government, and improvement of infrastructure, beginning with the rule of King Charles III and the work of his minister, José Moñino, count of Floridablanca. In the political and economic sphere, the crown implemented a series of changes, collectively known as the Bourbon reforms, which were aimed at making the overseas Spanish Empire more prosperous to the benefit of Spain.

The Spanish Enlightenment sought the expansion of scientific knowledge, which had been urged by Benedictine monk Benito Feijóo. From 1777 to 1816, the Spanish crown funded scientific expeditions to gather information about the potential botanical wealth of the empire. When Prussian scientist Alexander von Humboldt proposed a self-funded scientific expedition to Spanish America, the Spanish crown accorded him not only permission, but the instructions to crown officials to aid him. Spanish scholars sought to understand the decline of the Spanish empire from its earlier glory days, with the aim of reclaiming its former prestige.

The Spanish Enlightenment influenced the Spanish American Enlightenment to some extent, especially in the early phases of the movement, with elite American-born Spanish men involved in these projects; however, Spanish American Enlightenment ideas became increasingly shaped by local realities and more radical.

The Napoleonic invasion of the Iberian peninsula was enormously destabilizing for Spain and the Spanish overseas empire. The ideas of the Hispanic Enlightenment have been seen as a major contributor to the Spanish American wars of independence, although the situation is more complex.

== Historical background ==
The French Bourbons had a strong claim on the Spanish throne following the death of the last Habsburg monarch, Charles II, who died without an heir in 1700. After the War of the Spanish Succession, the Bourbon dynasty was to rule the Spanish crown, on the concession to their enemies that the Spanish and French crowns were never merged, and the cession of Spanish possessions elsewhere in Europe. Once they consolidated rule in Spain, the Bourbon monarchs embarked upon a series of reforms to revitalize the Spanish empire, which had significantly declined in power in the late Habsburg era. The ideas of the Age of Enlightenment had a strong impact in Spain and a ripple effect in Spanish American Enlightenment in Spain's overseas empire. Despite the general anticlerical tendencies of the Enlightenment, Spain and Spanish America held Roman Catholicism as a core identity. When French forces under Napoleon Bonaparte invaded the Iberian peninsula and placed Napoleon's brother Joseph on the throne of Spain, there was a crisis of legitimacy in both Spain and its overseas empire. The Cortes of Cádiz, which served as a democratic Regency after Ferdinand VII was deposed, ratified a liberal constitution in 1812, limiting the power of the monarchy constitutionally as well as the power of the Catholic Church. Ferdinand VII claimed he supported the liberal constitutions, but once restored to power in 1814, he renounced it and reverted to unfettered absolutist rule. In most parts of Spanish America during the Napoleonic period in Spain, wars of independence broke out, so that by the time Bourbon Ferdinand VII was restored to the throne in 1814, much of Spanish America had achieved independence and established constitutional republics. New Spain (Mexico) and Peru were the exceptions, becoming independent in 1821 (Mexico) and 1824 (Peru). Mexico briefly had a monarchy under royalist military officer turned insurgent Agustín de Iturbide, who was overthrown in favor of a federated republic under the Constitution of 1824.

== Development ==
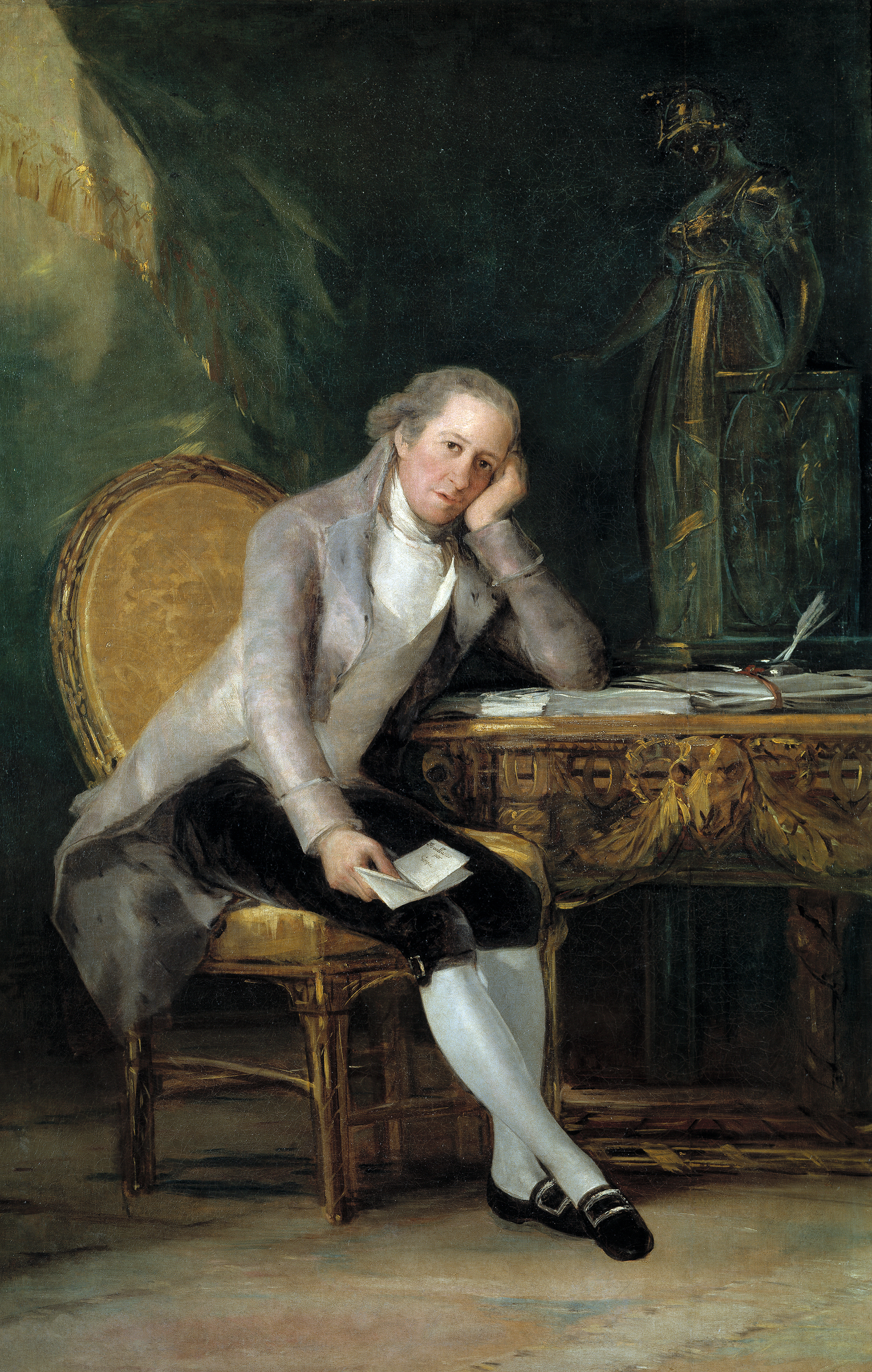
Gaspar Melchor de Jovellanos, painted by Francisco Goya

The ideas of the French Enlightenment came to Spain following the establishment of the Bourbon dynasty in Spain in 1715, with the end of the War of the Spanish Succession. In Spain, as elsewhere in much of Europe, there was no consistent pattern of the Enlightenment on the monarchy, which continued to follow existing frameworks of authority and hierarchy.

A leading Spanish figure was Benito Feijóo (1676–1764) a Benedictine monk and professor. He was a successful popularizer noted for encouraging scientific and empirical thought in an effort to debunk myths and superstition. His Teatro crítico universal (1726–39) bemoaned that "physics, and mathematics are almost foreigners in Spain."

The eighteenth century was an era with increasing absolutism in Europe, with centralization of power of monarchies, which sought to undermine rival powers, such as the Roman Catholic Church, modernize administration and promote economic measures for greater prosperity, and gain power in the international sphere. In Spain, the ideas of the Age of Enlightenment reached Spain in attenuated form about 1750, and emphasized there reforms that would increase Spain's prosperity and return it to its former position as a major power. Attention focused on medicine and physics, with some philosophy. French and Italian visitors were influential but there was little challenge to Catholicism or the Church such as characterized the French philosophes.

In Spain, one of the leading intellectuals was Minister of Justice Gaspar Melchor de Jovellanos, who in an address to the Royal Academy of History, called on "patriots" to study legal history, particularly of the deep past of the Visigothic era, and faulted Spain for its failure "to conserve the constitution in its primitive purity." In his Informe en el expediente de ley agraria (1795), he deplored the accumulation of land by aristocrats and the Church, which kept most Spaniards landless. A solution, also urged by Campomanes, was the sale of all Church lands.

Historian Jonathan Israel argues that King Charles III cared little for the Enlightenment and his ministers paid little attention to the Enlightenment ideas influential elsewhere on the Continent. Quoting Israel, "Only a few ministers and officials were seriously committed to enlightened aims. Most were first and foremost absolutists and their objective was always to reinforce monarchy, empire, aristocracy...and ecclesiastical control and authority over education."

=== Science and religion ===
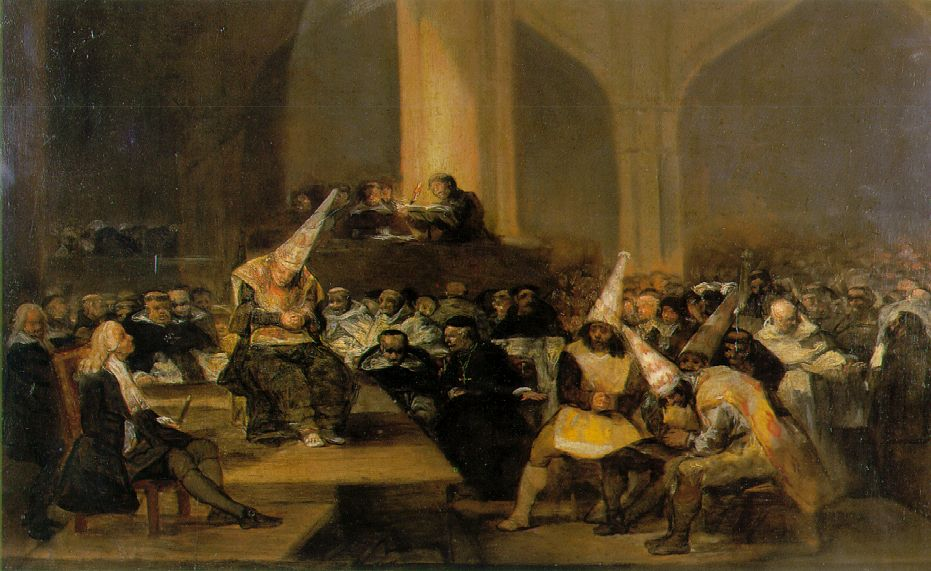
Inquisition Scene by Francisco Goya. The Spanish Inquisition was still in force in the late eighteenth century. but much reduced in power.

The Enlightenment emphasized scientific inquiry and approaches to the world, which could be in conflict with religious world views. The Spanish Inquisition had the power to censor books and suppress unorthodox thought, increasingly ideas of the Enlightenment circulated in Spain. By the 1770s the conservatives had launched a counterattack and used censorship and the Inquisition to suppress Enlightenment ideas, but the "French Encyclopédie... was nonetheless available to readers who wanted it." The writings of Montesquieu, Rousseau, Adam Smith, Condillac, Raynal, Buffon, and Linnaeus were in circulation among intellectual elites in Spain.

The 1755 Lisbon earthquake and tsunami that destroyed much of the Portuguese capital was felt on the entire Iberian peninsula and beyond. Intellectuals and others debated whether the earthquake was divine retribution or a natural phenomenon.

=== Scientific expeditions and scientific institutions ===
The crown sponsored a series of scientific expeditions of its own and authorized foreign scientists, such as La Condamine and Alexander von Humboldt, to its overseas empire, usually closed to foreigners. There were extended Royal Botanical Expeditions to Chile and Peru (1777–88), New Granada (1783–1816), and New Spain (1787–1803), which scholars are now examining afresh. which produced a huge number of detailed botanical drawings and specimens destined for the Royal Botanical Garden and the Royal Natural History Cabinet in Madrid. The Malaspina Expedition was an important scientific expedition headed by Spanish naval commander Alejandro Malaspina over five years (1789–94), with naturalists and botanical illustrators gathering information for the Spanish crown. The illustrators on the voyage included José de Pozo, trained at the Royal Academy of Fine Arts in Madrid, and, with other artists on the voyage, produced a plethora of botanical images as well as coastal views, ethnographic images, views of the expedition's ships, Descubierta and Atrevida, and a self-portrait in Patagonia. In Mexico, the Malaspina Expedition helped spur the founding of a botanical garden in Mexico City, as well as the Museo de Historia Natural. The crown also funded the Balmis Expedition in 1804 to vaccinate colonial populations against smallpox.

Much of the scientific research done under the auspices of the Spanish government in the eighteenth century was never published or otherwise disseminated, in part due to budgetary constraints on the crown. Starting in the late twentieth century, research on the history of science in Spain and the Spanish empire has blossomed, with primary sources being published in scholarly editions or reissued, as well the publication of a considerable number of important scholarly studies. An exception was Alexander von Humboldt, who published at his own expense his scientific findings and observations during his self-funded expedition to Spanish America 1799–1804.

=== New institutions ===
Even at the beginning of the Bourbon era, Spain was already creating institutions to systematize and promote intellectual research in the early eighteenth century with the founding of the National Library (1711), Royal Spanish Academy (1713), and the Royal Academy of History (1738). Institutions founded in the later eighteenth century were designed to promote scientific knowledge, such as the Royal Botanical Gardens (1755) in Madrid, where specimens from the Malaspina Expedition augmented the collection. In Mexico, the crown established the School of Mines (1792), based on the Basque institute at Vergara, headed by scientist Fausto Elhuyar, to increase scientific knowledge about mining Spain's most valuable commodity, silver.

As part of the attempt to revitalize the historiography of Spain and Charles III's general centralizing policies, the Archive of the Indies was established in Seville in 1785 to bring together documents pertaining to Spain's overseas empire.

=== Architecture ===
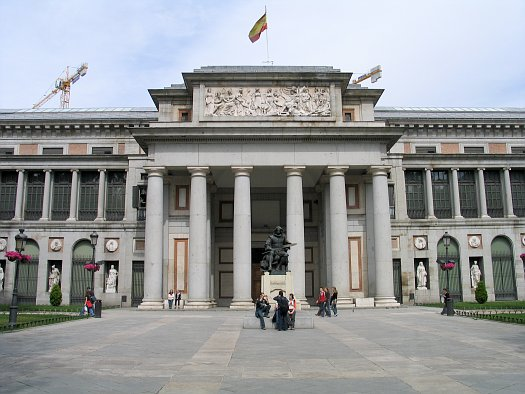
The Prado Museum, Madrid

The Palacio de Minería in Mexico City was designed in the neoclassical style by Spanish architect Manuel Tolsá. The Spanish crown had mandated that "all new churches and other public buildings should be constructed in the neo-classic style, their design first approved by the Academy of San Fernando." Madrid had a number of buildings constructed in neoclassic style; Charles III's architect, Juan de Villanueva, designed a neoclassical building in 1785 to hold the Natural History Cabinet, but which became the Prado Museum to display paintings and sculpture.

=== Literature ===
Spanish Enlightenment literature came between Baroque and Romantic literature. Major figures of Spanish Enlightenment literature include Feijoo and Jovellanos.

== Influence on the Spanish American Enlightenment ==
The Spanish Enlightenment helped shape the early Spanish American Enlightenment. However, Spanish American thinkers increasingly turned to more radical ideas.

== See also ==
- Spanish Renaissance
- History of Spain (1700–1808)
- Social class in 18th-century Spain

== Sources ==
- Bleichmar, Daniela, ed. (2008). Science in the Spanish and Portuguese Empires, 1500–1800. Stanford University Press.
- Bleichmar, Daniela (2012). Visible Empire: Botanical Expeditions & Visible Culture in the Hispanic Enlightenment. University of Chicago Press.
- Brading, David (1971). Miners and Merchants in Bourbon Mexico, 1763–1810. Cambridge University Press.
- Brading, David (1991). The First America: The Spanish Monarchy, Creole Patriots, and the Liberal State, 1492–1867. Cambridge University Press.
- Cañizares-Esguerra, Jorge (2001). How to Write the History of the New World: Histories, Epistemologies, and Identities in the Eighteenth-Century Atlantic World. Stanford University Press.
- Cañizares-Esguerra, Jorge (2006). Nature, Empire, and Nation: Explorations in the History of Science in the Iberian World. Stanford University Press.
- De Vos, Paula S. (2006). "Research, Development, and Empire: State Support of Science in Spain and Spanish America, Sixteenth to Eighteenth Centuries". Colonial Latin America Review. 15 (1): 55–79. doi:10.1080/10609160600607432. S2CID 218576951.
- Florescano, Enrique (2000). "The Creation of the Museo Nacional de Antropología and its scientific, educational, and political purposes". In Hutchinson, John; Smith, Anthony D. (eds.). Nationalism: Critical concepts in Political Science. Vol. 4. London: Routledge.
- Herr, Richard (2000). "Flow and Ebb, 1700–1833". In Carr, Raymond (ed.). Spain: A History. Oxford University Press.
- Israel, Jonathan (2011). Democratic Enlightenment:Philosophy, Revolution, and Human Rights 1750–1790. Oxford University Press. ISBN 978-0-19-162004-1.
- Lynch, John (1989). Bourbon Spain 1700–1808.
- Payne, Stanley G. (1973). A History of Spain and Portugal. Vol. 2.
- Rickett, Harold W. (1947). "The Royal Botanical Expedition to New Spain". Chronica Botanica. 11 (1): 1–81.
- Udías, Agustín (2009). "Earthquakes as God's punishment in 17th-and 18th-century Spain". Geological Society, London, Special Publications. 310 (1): 41–48. Bibcode:2009GSLSP.310...41U. doi:10.1144/SP310.6.
