= Carlos Valverde =

Carlos Valverde may refer to:

- Carlos Valverde (footballer, born 1985), Spanish footballer
- Carlos Valverde (footballer, born 1988), Spanish footballer
