= Malpartida =

- Municipality
- Location in Salamanca

- Location in Spain
- Coordinates: 40°45′46″N 5°14′00″W
- Country: Spain
- Autonomous community: Castile and León
- Province: Salamanca
- Comarca: Tierra de Peñaranda

Government
  - Mayor: José Luís Salinero Ruano (People's Party)

Area
  - Total: 10 km^{2} (3.9 sq mi)
- Elevation: 900 m (3,000 ft)

Population (2025-01-01)
  - Total: 74
  - Density: 7.4/km^{2} (19/sq mi)
- Time zone: UTC+1 (CET)
  - Summer (DST): UTC+2 (CEST)
- Postal code: 37313

Malpartida is a municipality located in the province of Salamanca, Castile and León, Spain.
