= Mancera de Abajo =

- Municipality
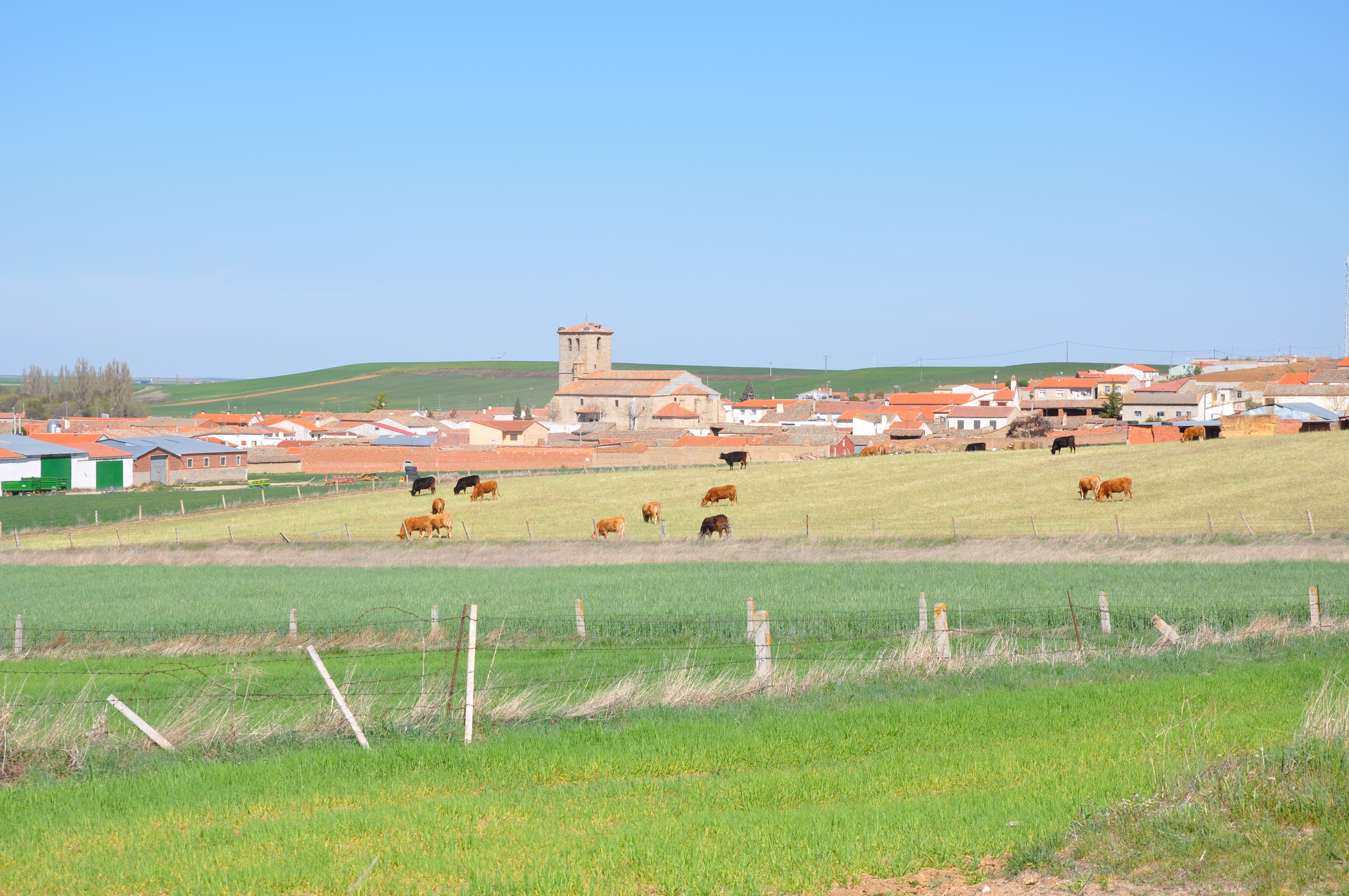
- Panorama of Mancera de Abajo

- Flag Coat of arms

- Location in Salamanca

- Location in Spain
- Coordinates: 40°50′N 5°12′W
- Country: Spain
- Autonomous community: Castile and León
- Province: Salamanca
- Comarca: Tierra de Peñaranda

Government
  - Alcalde (Mayor): Juan Carlos Zaballos Martínez, PP

Area
  - Total: 23 km^{2} (8.9 sq mi)
- Elevation: 898 m (2,946 ft)

Population (2025-01-01)
  - Total: 192
  - Density: 8.3/km^{2} (22/sq mi)
- Time zone: UTC+1 (CET)
  - Summer (DST): UTC+2 (CEST)
- Postal code: 37315

Mancera de Abajo is a village and municipality in the province of Salamanca, western Spain, part of the autonomous community of Castile-Leon. It is located 48 kilometres (30 mi) from the provincial capital city of Salamanca and has a population of 225 people.

== Geography ==
The municipality covers an area of 23 km^{2} (8.9 sq mi). It lies 898 metres (2,946 ft) above sea level and the postal code is 37315.

== Economy ==
- The basis of the economy is agriculture.

== See also ==
- List of municipalities in Salamanca
