= Nava de Sotrobal =

- Municipality
- Coat of arms

- Location in Salamanca
- Coordinates: 40°53′22″N 5°17′11″W
- Country: Spain
- Autonomous community: Castile and León
- Province: Salamanca
- Comarca: Tierra de Peñaranda

Government
  - Mayor: Juan Antonio Díaz Gómez (People's Party)

Area
  - Total: 45 km^{2} (17 sq mi)
- Elevation: 855 m (2,805 ft)

Population (2025-01-01)
  - Total: 147
  - Density: 3.3/km^{2} (8.5/sq mi)
- Time zone: UTC+1 (CET)
  - Summer (DST): UTC+2 (CEST)
- Postal code: 37850

Nava de Sotrobal is a municipality located in the province of Salamanca, Castile and León, Spain. As of 2016 the municipality has a population of 163 inhabitants.
