= Paradinas de San Juan =

- Municipality
- Flag Coat of arms

- Location in Salamanca
- Coordinates: 40°59′1″N 5°9′12″W
- Country: Spain
- Autonomous community: Castile and León
- Province: Salamanca
- Comarca: Tierra de Peñaranda

Government
  - Mayor: Florencia Castillo (People's Party)

Area
  - Total: 36 km^{2} (14 sq mi)
- Elevation: 852 m (2,795 ft)

Population (2025-01-01)
  - Total: 380
  - Density: 11/km^{2} (27/sq mi)
- Time zone: UTC+1 (CET)
  - Summer (DST): UTC+2 (CEST)
- Postal code: 37318

Paradinas de San Juan is a village and municipality in the province of Salamanca, western Spain, part of the autonomous community of Castile-Leon. It is located 50 kilometres (31 mi) from the provincial capital city of Salamanca and has a population of 410 people.

== Geography ==
The municipality covers an area of 36 km^{2} (14 sq mi). It lies 852 metres (2,795 ft) above sea level and the postal code is 37318.

== See also ==
- List of municipalities in Salamanca
