= Villar de Gallimazo =

- Municipality
- Location in Salamanca
- Coordinates: 40°57′15″N 5°17′20″W
- Country: Spain
- Autonomous community: Castile and León
- Province: Salamanca
- Comarca: Tierra de Peñaranda

Government
  - Mayor: Sergio González (People's Party)

Area
  - Total: 44 km^{2} (17 sq mi)
- Elevation: 855 m (2,805 ft)

Population (2025-01-01)
  - Total: 192
  - Density: 4.4/km^{2} (11/sq mi)
- Time zone: UTC+1 (CET)
  - Summer (DST): UTC+2 (CEST)
- Postal code: 37320

Villar de Gallimazo is a municipality located in the province of Salamanca, Castile and León, Spain. As of 2016 the municipality has a population of 202 inhabitants.
