= Carlos Valverde (footballer, born 1988) =

Spanish footballer

Personal information
- Full name: Carlos Valverde Madrid
- Date of birth: 5 March 1988 (age 38)
- Place of birth: Santiago de la Puebla, Spain
- Height: 1.80 m (5 ft 11 in)
- Position: Left back

Team information
- Current team: Plasencia

Youth career
- Salamanca

Senior career*
Years	Team	Apps	(Gls)
2006–2011	Salamanca B		
2008–2011	Salamanca	5	(0)
2011–2012	Badajoz	8	(0)
2012–2013	Guijuelo	10	(0)
2013–2014	Quintanar Rey	15	(1)
2014–2015	Puertollano	15	(0)
2015	Boiro	11	(1)
2015–2016	Zamora	34	(0)
2016–2017	Salmantino		
2017–2018	Guadalajara	26	(0)
2018–	Plasencia	0	(0)
- * Club domestic league appearances and goals as of 20 May 2018

Carlos Valverde Madrid (born 5 March 1988 in Santiago de la Puebla, Province of Salamanca) is a Spanish footballer who plays for UP Plasencia as a left back.
