= Alconada =

- Municipality
- Location in Salamanca

- Location in Spain
- Coordinates: 40°54′41″N 5°21′48″W
- Country: Spain
- Autonomous community: Castile and León
- Province: Salamanca
- Comarca: Tierra de Peñaranda

Government
  - Mayor: Julián Flores García (People's Party)

Area
  - Total: 21 km^{2} (8.1 sq mi)
- Elevation: 820 m (2,690 ft)

Population (2025-01-01)
  - Total: 130
  - Density: 6.2/km^{2} (16/sq mi)
- Time zone: UTC+1 (CET)
  - Summer (DST): UTC+2 (CEST)
- Postal code: 37329

Alconada is a village and municipality in the province of Salamanca, western Spain, part of the autonomous community of Castile and León.
