= Cantaracillo =

- Municipality
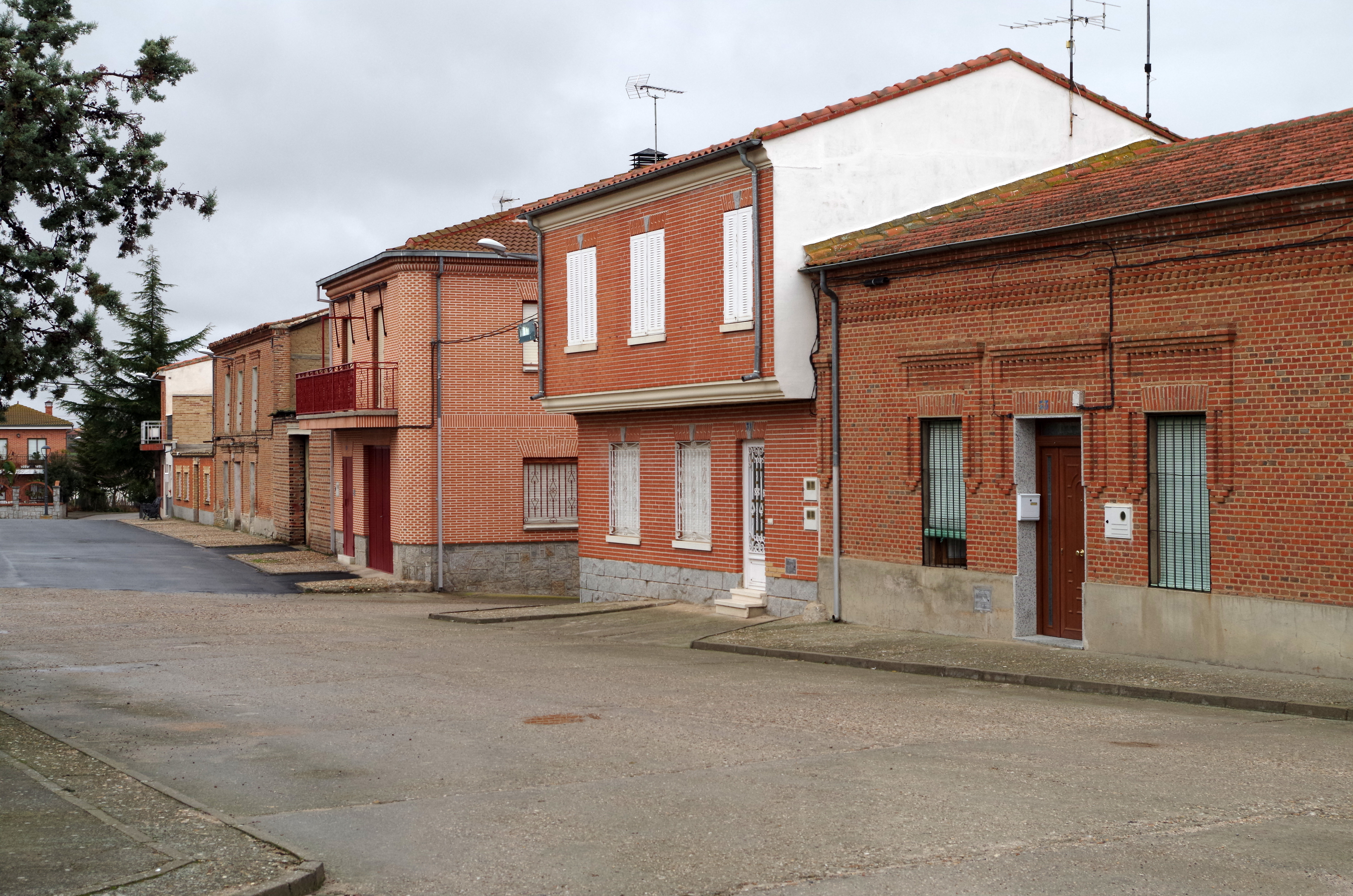

- Location in Salamanca

- Location in Spain
- Coordinates: 40°54′N 5°10′W
- Country: Spain
- Autonomous community: Castile and León
- Province: Salamanca
- Comarca: Tierra de Peñaranda

Government
  - Mayor: J. Carlos Martín (People's Party)

Area
  - Total: 37 km^{2} (14 sq mi)
- Elevation: 913 m (2,995 ft)

Population (2025-01-01)
  - Total: 188
  - Density: 5.1/km^{2} (13/sq mi)
- Time zone: UTC+1 (CET)
  - Summer (DST): UTC+2 (CEST)
- Postal code: 37319

Cantaracillo is a village and municipality in the province of Salamanca, western Spain, part of the autonomous community of Castile and Leon. It is located 42 kilometres (26 mi) from the city of Salamanca and as of 2016 has a population of 204 people. The municipality covers an area of 37 km^{2} (14 sq mi).

The village lies 913 metres (2,995 ft) above sea level.

The postal code is 37319.
