= Tordillos =

- Municipality
- Flag Coat of arms

- Location in Salamanca
- Coordinates: 40°51′15″N 5°21′09″W
- Country: Spain
- Autonomous community: Castile and León
- Province: Salamanca
- Comarca: Tierra de Peñaranda

Government
  - Mayor: Ángel Luis Alonso (People's Party)

Area
  - Total: 25 km^{2} (9.7 sq mi)
- Elevation: 841 m (2,759 ft)

Population (2025-01-01)
  - Total: 306
  - Density: 12/km^{2} (32/sq mi)
- Time zone: UTC+1 (CET)
  - Summer (DST): UTC+2 (CEST)
- Postal code: 37840

Tordillos is a municipality located in the province of Salamanca, Castile and León, Spain. As of 2016 the municipality has a population of 377 inhabitants.
