= Zorita de la Frontera =

- Municipality
- Flag Coat of arms

- Location in Salamanca

- Location in Spain
- Coordinates: 41°00′51″N 5°12′50″W
- Country: Spain
- Autonomous community: Castile and León
- Province: Salamanca
- Comarca: Tierra de Peñaranda

Government
  - Mayor: José Manuel Partearroyo Rodero (People's Party)

Area
  - Total: 32.13 km^{2} (12.41 sq mi)
- Elevation: 831 m (2,726 ft)

Population (2025-01-01)
  - Total: 140
  - Density: 4.4/km^{2} (11/sq mi)
- Time zone: UTC+1 (CET)
  - Summer (DST): UTC+2 (CEST)
- Postal code: 37408

Zorita de la Frontera is a municipality in the province of Salamanca, western Spain, part of the autonomous community of Castile and León. It is located 54 kilometers from the city of Salamanca.
