= El Campo de Peñaranda =

- Municipality
- Location in Salamanca

- Location in Spain
- Coordinates: 40°59′N 5°15′W
- Country: Spain
- Autonomous community: Castile and León
- Province: Salamanca
- Comarca: Tierra de Peñaranda

Government
  - Mayor: Campo de Peñaranda (PSOE)

Area
  - Total: 45.2 km^{2} (17.5 sq mi)
- Elevation: 839 m (2,753 ft)

Population (2025-01-01)
  - Total: 241
  - Density: 5.33/km^{2} (13.8/sq mi)
- Time zone: UTC+1 (CET)
  - Summer (DST): UTC+2 (CEST)
- Postal code: 37317

El Campo de Peñaranda is a village and municipality in the province of Salamanca, western Spain, part of the autonomous community of Castile-Leon. It is located 40 kilometres (25 mi) from the provincial capital city of Salamanca and has a population of 274 people.

== Geography ==
The municipality covers an area of 45 km^{2} (17 sq mi). It lies 839 metres (2,753 ft) above sea level and the postal code is 37317.

== Economy ==
- The basis of the economy is agriculture.

== See also ==
- List of municipalities in Salamanca
