= Salmoral =

- Municipality
- Location in Salamanca
- Coordinates: 40°48′5″N 5°13′13″W
- Country: Spain
- Autonomous community: Castile and León
- Province: Salamanca
- Comarca: Tierra de Peñaranda

Government
  - Mayor: Carlos Hernández (People's Party)

Area
  - Total: 23 km^{2} (8.9 sq mi)
- Elevation: 909 m (2,982 ft)

Population (2025-01-01)
  - Total: 107
  - Density: 4.7/km^{2} (12/sq mi)
- Time zone: UTC+1 (CET)
  - Summer (DST): UTC+2 (CEST)
- Postal code: 37314

Salmoral is a municipality located in the province of Salamanca, Castile and León, Spain. As of 2016 the municipality has a population of 147 inhabitants.
