= Jorge Canizares-Esguerra =

Jorge Cañizares-Esguerra is a faculty member in the history department at the University of Texas at Austin, where he holds the Alice Drysdale Sheffield Professorship in History. He is most notable for his work in Atlantic history, the history of science in the early modern Spanish Empire, and the colonizing ideologies of the Iberian and British empires.

The core of his intellectual project has been to demonstrate the deep formative role of Latin America both to the colonial history of the U.S. and to the history of Western modernity as a whole. While Latin America does appear in the histories of slavery, globalization, and capitalism, Canizares-Esguerra goes beyond these narratives and introduces the region as the cradle of modern science, abolitionism, republicanism, and democracy.

He was born in Ecuador, and grew up in Mexico and Colombia. He earned his doctorate in the History of Science Department at University of Wisconsin and has held a number of fellowships. Cañizares-Esguerra has held a Visiting Leverhulme Trust Professorship at the Institute of Advanced Studies, University of London, one of the most distinguished professorships in the UK. The Institute of Advanced Studies of Warwick University has also hosted Cañizares-Esguerra as distinguished visiting professor.

He is a permanent distinguished professor at the Facultad Latinoamericana de Ciencias Sociales (FLACSO) in Quito.

In 2018, he received the Nancy Lyman Roelker Mentorship Award by the American Historical Association, established to honor teachers of history who taught, guided, and inspired their students in a way that changed their lives. Cañizares-Esguerra got the prize for his dedication to the mentorship of graduate students and junior faculty.

Cañizares-Esguerra is the author and editor of a dozen books, many of which have been translated into several languages. His book How to Write the History of the New World won several academic prizes and was also selected as one of the best books of the year by The Economist, The Independent, and The Times Literary Supplement.

He has published more than 85 peer-reviewed journal articles and book chapters. His articles have appeared in the most prestigious journals of the historical profession in the US, Germany, Italy, and Spain, including articles in the American Historical Review (3), The William and Mary Quarterly (2), Isis (2), Journal of Early Modern History (2), Archiv für Reformationsgeschichte, Ricerche di Storia Politica, and Revista de Occidente. He is also known for having co-authored the Hispanic Equity Report, a scathing sociological and statistical analysis of structural discrimination of Hispanic faculty at the University of Texas-Austin.

== Selected books ==
- How to Write the History of the New World: Histories, Epistemologies, and Identities in the Eighteenth-Century Atlantic World (Stanford University Press, 2002), Winner, John E. Fagg Prize in Spanish and Latin American history, American Historical Association; the book also won the James A. Rawley Prize in Atlantic History, American Historical Association.
- Nature, Empire, and Nation: Explorations of the History of Science in the Iberian World (Stanford University Press, 2006)
- Puritan Conquistadors: Iberianizing the Atlantic, 1550-1700 (Stanford University Press, 2006), Honorable Mention, Murdo J. MacLeod Prize, The Southern Historical Association Latin American and Caribbean Section
- Entangled Empires: The Anglo-Iberian Atlantic 1500-1824 (University Of Pennsylvania Press, 2017).
