= Macotera =

- Municipality
- Flag Coat of arms

- Location in Salamanca
- Coordinates: 40°50′N 5°17′W
- Country: Spain
- Autonomous community: Castile and León
- Province: Salamanca
- Comarca: Tierra de Peñaranda

Government
  - Mayor: Francisco Bláquez Sánchez

Area
  - Total: 33 km^{2} (13 sq mi)
- Elevation: 892 m (2,927 ft)

Population (2025)
  - Total: 1,009
  - Density: 31/km^{2} (79/sq mi)
- Demonym: Macoterano
- Time zone: UTC+1 (CET)
  - Summer (DST): UTC+2 (CEST)
- Postal code: 37310
- Distances: 10 km to Peñaranda de Bracamonte; 50 km (31 mi) to Salamanca; 179 km (111 mi) to Valladolid; 177 km (110 mi) to Madrid
- Rivers: River Margañán

Macotera is a village and municipality in the province of Salamanca, western Spain, part of the autonomous community of Castile-Leon. It is located 50 kilometres (31 mi) from the capital city of Salamanca.

== See also ==
- List of municipalities in Salamanca
