= Santiago de la Puebla =

- Municipality
- Coat of arms

- Location in Salamanca
- Coordinates: 40°28′7″N 5°1′43″W
- Country: Spain
- Autonomous community: Castile and León
- Province: Salamanca
- Comarca: Tierra de Peñaranda

Government
  - Alcalde (Mayor): Casimiro García Pérez (2011) (PSOE)

Area
  - Total: 53 km^{2} (20 sq mi)
- Elevation: 867 m (2,844 ft)

Population (2025-01-01)
  - Total: 280
  - Density: 5.3/km^{2} (14/sq mi)
- Time zone: UTC+1 (CET)
  - Summer (DST): UTC+2 (CEST)
- Postal code: 37311
- Dialing code: 923
- Website: santiagodelapuebla.es

Santiago de la Puebla is a village and municipality in the province of Salamanca, western Spain, part of the autonomous community of Castile-Leon. It is located 54 kilometres from the provincial capital city of Salamanca and has a population of 417 people.

== Geography ==
The municipality covers an area of 53 km². It lies 824 metres above sea level.

== Economy ==
The economy is based primarily on agriculture and olive growing.

== See also ==
- List of municipalities in Salamanca
