= Ventosa del Río Almar =

- Municipality
- Coat of arms

- Location in Salamanca

- Location in Spain
- Coordinates: 40°55′44″N 5°20′53″W
- Country: Spain
- Autonomous community: Castile and León
- Province: Salamanca
- Comarca: Tierra de Ledesma

Government
  - Mayor: Ángel Moro Sánchez (People's Party)

Area
  - Total: 18 km^{2} (6.9 sq mi)
- Elevation: 854 m (2,802 ft)

Population (2025-01-01)
  - Total: 97
  - Density: 5.4/km^{2} (14/sq mi)
- Time zone: UTC+1 (CET)
  - Summer (DST): UTC+2 (CEST)
- Postal code: 37329

Ventosa del Río Almar is a municipality located in the province of Salamanca, Castile and León, Spain. As of 2016 the municipality has a population of 121 inhabitants.
