= Spanish American Enlightenment =

Philosophical movement leading to revolutions

The ideas of the Spanish Enlightenment, which emphasized reason, science, practicality, clarity rather than obscurantism, and secularism, were transmitted from France to the New World in the eighteenth century, following the establishment of the Bourbon monarchy in Spain. In Spanish America, the ideas of the Enlightenment affected educated elites in major urban centers, especially Mexico City, Lima, and Guatemala, where there were universities founded in the sixteenth and seventeenth centuries. In these centers of learning, American-born Spanish intellectuals were already participants in intellectual and scientific discourse, with Spanish American universities increasingly anti-scholastic and opposed to “untested authority” even before the Spanish Bourbons came to power. The best studied is the University of San Carlos Guatemala, founded in 1676.

== History ==
In Spanish America, just as in Spain, the Enlightenment had some aspects of anticlericalism, but many priests were in favor of science and scientific thinking and were practitioners themselves. Some clergy were proponents of the Enlightenment as well as independence. Enlightenment texts circulating in Spanish America have been linked to the intellectual underpinnings of Spanish American independence.

Works by Enlightenment philosophers were owned and read in Spanish America, despite restrictions on the book trade and their inclusion on the Inquisition’s list of forbidden books . The Jesuits were instrumental introducing new trends in philosophy to Spanish America, and following their expulsion in 1767, the Franciscans continued exploring this line of thought. Spanish American secular clergy owned such works, including Mexican priest Miguel Hidalgo y Costilla, whose free-thinking lost him his position as rector of the seminary of San Nicolás and he was sent to the small parish of Dolores.

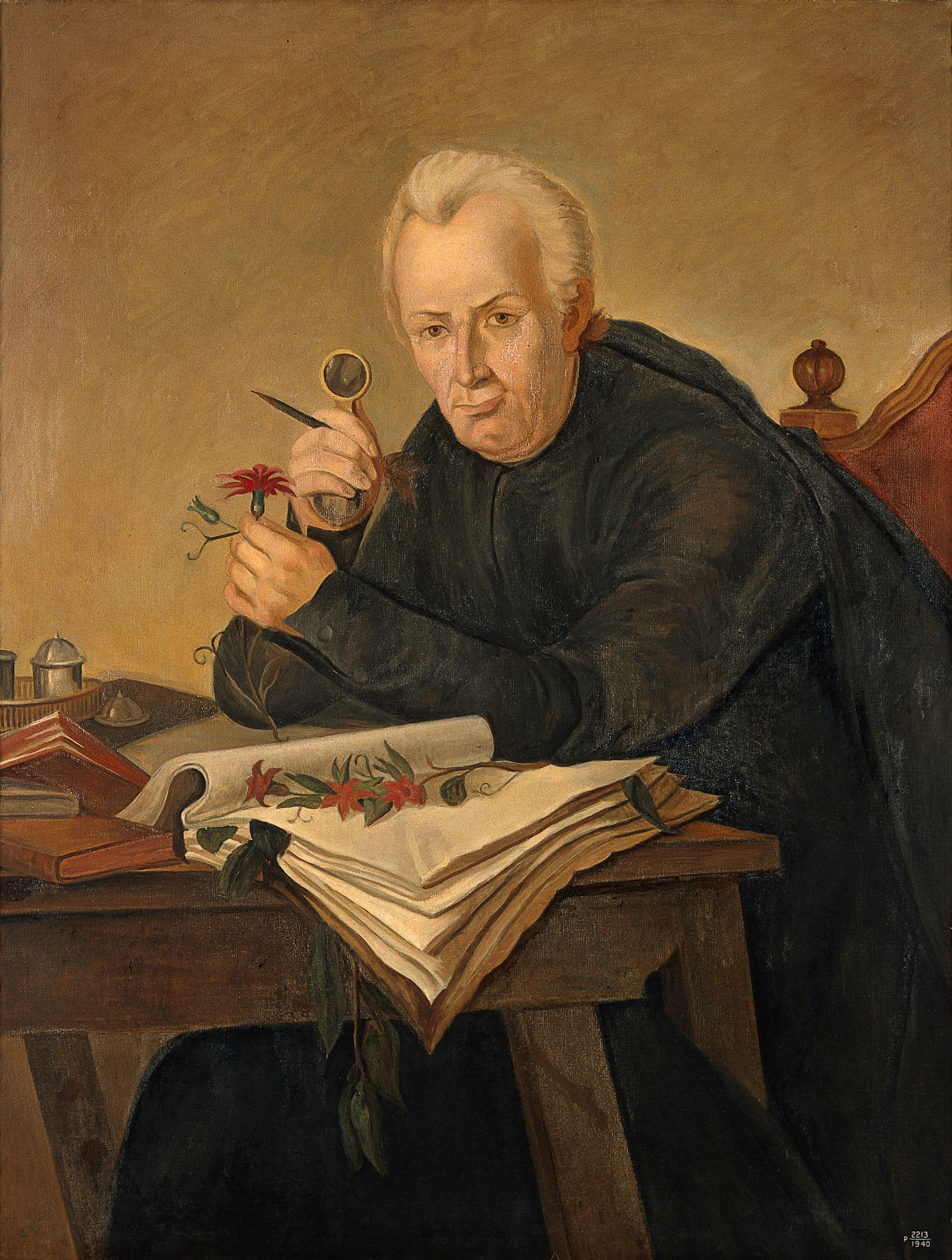
José Celestino Mutis, botanist of the Spanish American Enlightenment

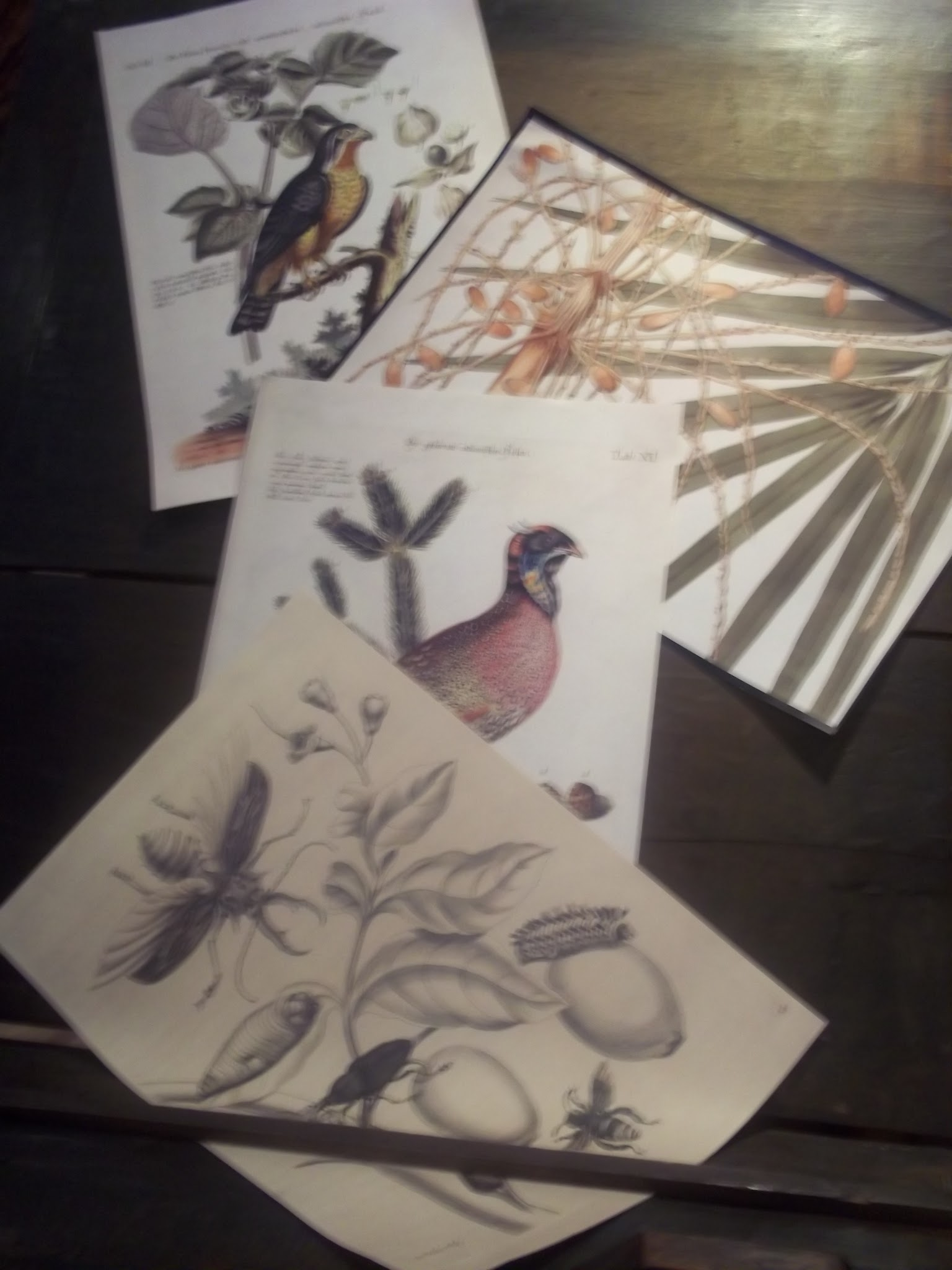
Illustrations from Spanish botanist José Celestino Mutis's work in Colombia.

Priests pursued science, even in the seventeenth-century “baroque” era, most prominently Mexican creole intellectual Don Carlos de Sigüenza y Góngora, as well as the remarkable Mexican nun, Sor Juana Inés de la Cruz. In the eighteenth century, there were several Spanish-born as well as American-born priests practicing science. Prominent among them was Spanish-born José Celestino Mutis in New Granada, who headed the royal botanical expedition to New Granada. He was educated in mathematics, astronomy, and medicine. Mutis trained Francisco José de Caldas. In Peru, Hipólito Unanue, a secular cleric trained in medicine, contributed to a Peruvian publication, Mercurio Peruano. Similar to him was Mexican secular cleric José Antonio de Alzate y Ramírez, who founded important newspapers that disseminated knowledge about scientific findings, including his own. Alexander von Humboldt met and consulted with Mutis, Caldas, and read the works of Alzate (who died just before Humboldt arrived in New Spain) during his scientific expedition to Spanish America at the beginning of the nineteenth century. Humboldt was impressed by the intellectual level of science in Spanish America.

Two strains of philosophical thought were evident in Spanish America, one was enlightened despotism and the other variations on constitutionalism. Divisions among clerics in Spanish America were between those supporting regalism, that is, the supremacy of the crown over the Catholic Church, and those adhering to ultramontanism, supporting the power of the papacy over monarchs. The Bourbon Reforms put into place by the Spanish crown made a strong impact on centralizing issues in Spanish America back to Spain. This had a large impact on the Catholic Church's loss of power in Spanish America The Spanish crown moved to consolidate its supremacy over the Catholic Church by suppressing the Society of Jesus in Spain and in its overseas empire in 1767. The Jesuits were “soldiers of the Pope”, taking a vow to serve the pontiff. They were successful in their missions to indigenous peoples on the frontiers of the Spanish empire, such as northern Mexico and most famously in Paraguay. Jesuit educational institutions had as pupils the sons of American born Spaniards, and were places where ideas of the Enlightenment were disseminated. The Jesuits held a considerable number of profitable landed estates, or haciendas, which were run efficiently by Jesuits trained in management. Their loyalty to the pope and their defiance of the crown authority as well as their clear success in important realms where the diocesan clergy or other religious orders might have excelled meant that their expulsion in 1767 was not opposed by the episcopal hierarchy or religious orders.

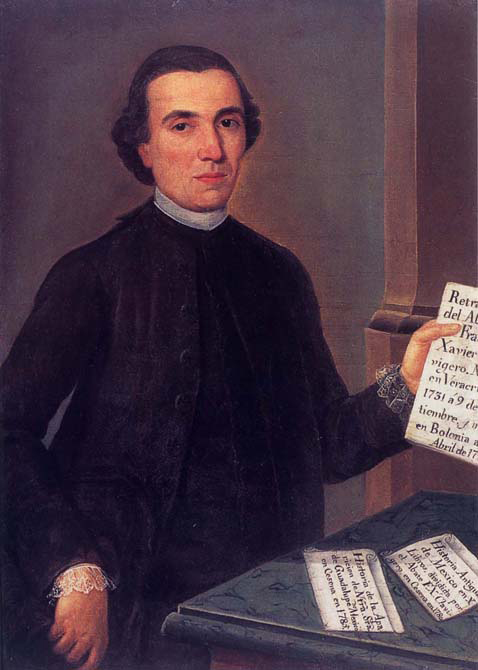
Francisco Javier Clavijero, Jesuit Mexican creole patriot.

The exile of the Jesuits to Europe was a blow to elite American-born Spanish families, whose sons were educated by the Jesuits or themselves Jesuits and has been seen as contributing to creole alienation from the Bourbon monarchy. An important exiled Jesuit was Francisco Javier Clavijero, who wrote a major history of Mexico, seeing its origins in the achievements of indigenous civilizations and creating an idea of Mexico separate from peninsular Spain.

The Spanish crown also moved against the clergy as a whole by attempted to limit the corporate privileges of the Catholic Church, the fuero eclesiástico, which gave clerics the right to be judged for all offenses in canonical rather than crown courts. The fuero had been an important factor in strengthening the prestige and power of the lower secular clergy. Parish priests were often the only person of European ethnicity in indigenous parishes, who exercised both political and sacred power.

In late colonial Mexico, an important bishop-elect Manuel Abad y Queipo, considered liberal, and sought social, economic, and political reforms, but he firmly opposed Father Hidalgo’s 1810 uprising for independence. Abad y Queipo gave Humboldt some of his writings on conditions in New Spain and the need for reform to Humboldt, and his ideas found their way into Humboldt’s famous ‘’Political Essay on the Kingdom of New Spain’’.

Another development in Spanish America was the formation of economic societies and “friends of the country,” by elite men to improve the local economy through science. They also functioned as discussion groups that considered political issues, particularly as crown policies increasingly favored the peninsula.

The Bourbon Reforms that started to gain traction in Spanish America in the mid-18th century encouraged economic progress and activities. The Bourbon Reforms also sought to make progress through education programs in Spanish America. The crown founded a number of institutions aimed at scientific and economic progress, as well as cultural advancement. In Mexico, the crown established of the College of Mines in 1792, directed by Spanish mineralogist Fausto Elhuyar. It was designed to train experts for the empire’s most lucrative industry, silver mining.

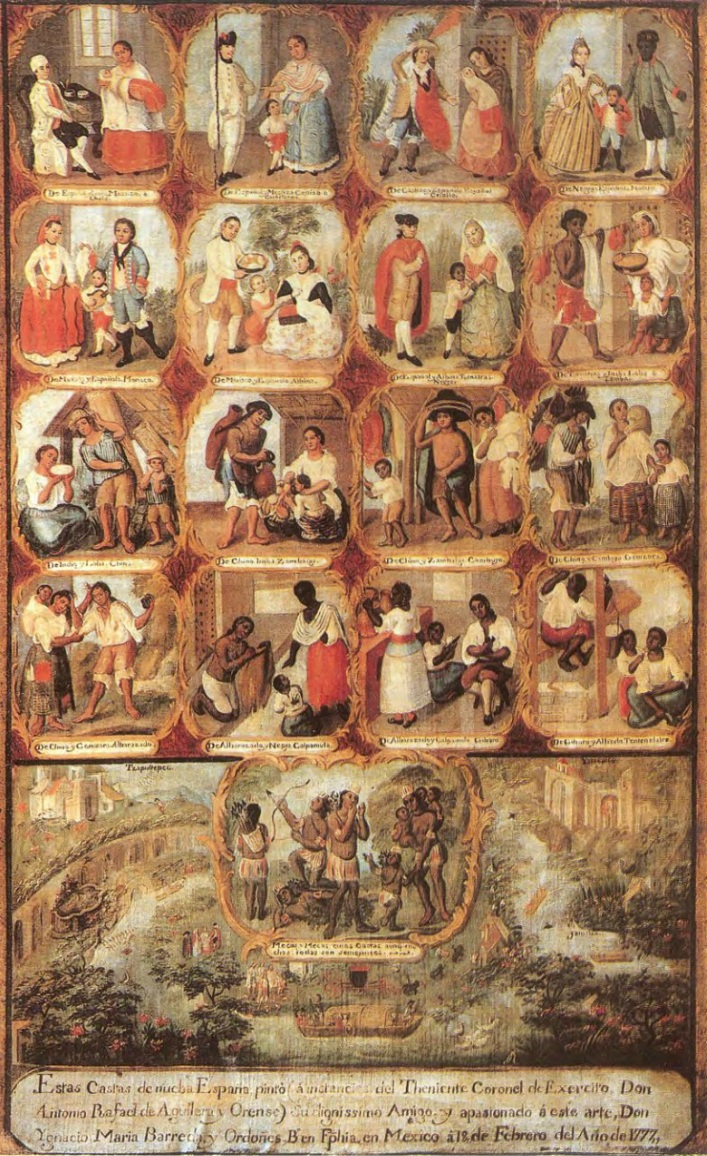
Depiction of the casta system in Mexico.

Art and architecture were cultural expressions that felt the impact of Enlightenment ideas. The Academy of San Carlos was founded in 1781 as the School for Engraving, and two years later renamed the Real Academia de la Tres Nobles Artes de San Carlos. Miguel Cabrera was one of its most important members. The Palacio de Minería in Mexico City and the hospicio in Guadalajara, as well as the cathedral in Buenos Aires were designed in the neoclassical style, favoring clean lines and minimal decoration, in contrast to the more ornate baroque architecture. "Readily understandable and providing solace in its promise of heavenly glory, the Baroque is an art for the people. It was this very popularity that led to the anti-Baroque movement of the highbrow Neoclassical academies of the eighteenth century." The growth of scientific ideas and the development of different kinds of taxonomy, such as Carl Linnaeus’s, may well have been the impetus behind the emergence of secular paintings of racial mixture and racial hierarchy in late eighteenth-century Mexico, called casta paintings.

The crown attempted to rein in popular aspects of “baroque” Catholicism, eliminating burials in the interior of churches and churchyards as a public health measure. It successfully suppressed Carnival in Mexico and sought to downsize popular pious practices such as religious processions. Secular entertainments such as bullfighting were no longer supported by the crown, and theatrical productions had didactic and secular themes rather than religious.

== See also ==
- Spanish Empire
- Spanish Enlightenment
- Historiography of Colonial Spanish America
