= Jerónimo Grimaldi, 1st Duke of Grimaldi =

Spanish diplomat and politician

The Most Excellent Jerónimo Grimaldi 1st Duke of Grimaldi GE
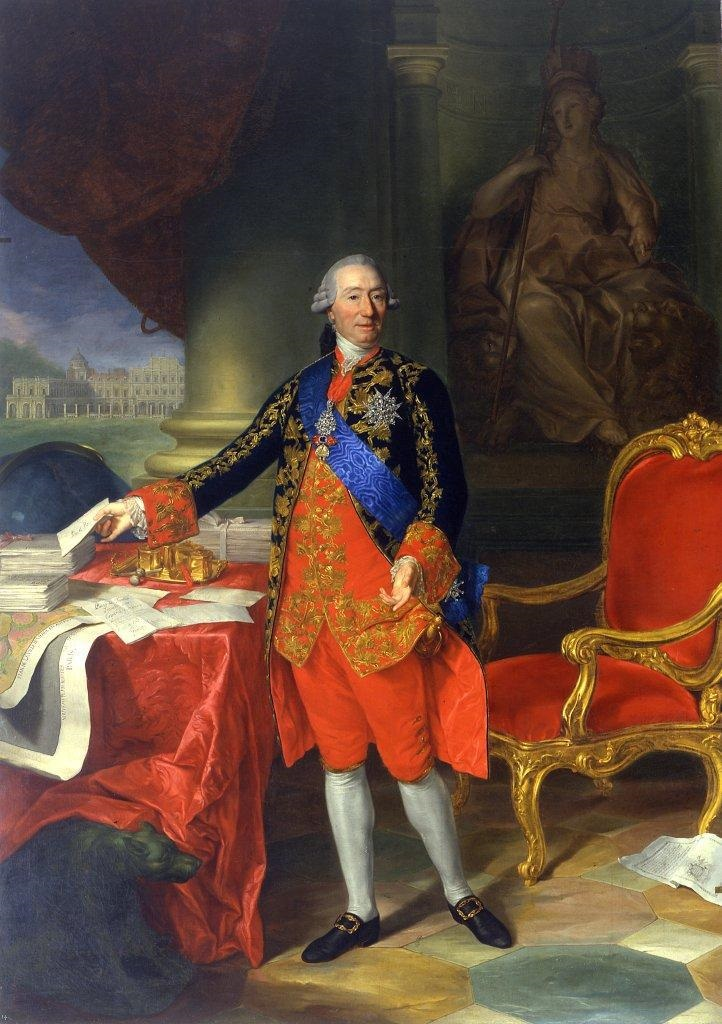
- Portrait by Francisco Javier Ramos

Chief Minister of Spain
- In office 9 October 1763 – 19 February 1777
- Monarch: Charles III
- Preceded by: Ricardo Wall
- Succeeded by: José Moñino

Personal details
- Born: Pablo Jerónimo Grimaldi y Pallavicini; 10 July 1710 Genoa, Republic of Genoa
- Died: 1 October 1789 (aged 79) Genoa, Republic of Genoa

Pablo Jerónimo Grimaldi y Pallavicini, 1st Duke of Grimaldi, GE (6 July 1710 – 1 October 1789) was a Spanish diplomat and politician. After extensive experience as an Ambassador, Grimaldi served as Chief Minister of Spain between 1763 and 1778 helping to rebuild Spanish power following its defeat during the Seven Years' War. For his services as Secretary of State, he was granted the title of Duke of Grimaldi by King Charles III of Spain. Grimaldi was of Genoese descent, and a member of the House of Grimaldi.

== Early life ==
Pablo Jeronimo was born as the younger son of Francesco Maria Grimaldi (d. 1754), Senator of the Republic of Genoa and his wife, Maria Giovanna Pallavicini (1679-1741). His brother Raniero Grimaldi also served as the Senator of the Republic of Genoa.

== Career ==
In the service of Spanish Kings Ferdinand VI and Charles III, Grimaldi was minister plenipotentiary in Sweden and Parma, and ambassador to the States-General of the United Provinces. Charles III named him ambassador to Paris, where together with French Secretary of State Étienne François, duc de Choiseul he negotiated the third Family Compact between France and Spain. This provoked the entry of Spain into the war with Britain. He also signed the Peace of Paris in 1763.

In September 1763, after the dismissal of Ricardo Wall he was named Spanish Minister of State, a position he held until 1776. He was a reformer, a member of the group known as golillas. Together with the Leopoldo de Gregorio, Marquis of Esquilache he helped suppress the 1766 riots provoked by Esquilache's reforms. (His house was sacked during the rioting.) He was a member of the junta that voted for the suppression of the Jesuits in 1767.

In 1776, after various conflicts, particularly the defeat of the 1775 expedition to Algiers, he was removed from office and made ambassador in Rome. He was made grandee of Spain and decorated with the Order of the Golden Fleece, 1765. He was also granted the title of Duque de Grimaldi, 8 April 1777, by King Charles III of Spain, a.k.a. former King Charles VII of Naples, for his services to the Spanish Crown. The successor in his government positions was also a "golilla", namely, José Moñino, 1st Count of Floridablanca, (Murcia, Spain, 21 October 1728 - Seville, Spain, 30 December 1808).

== See also ==
- List of French Ambassadors to Great Britain

Political offices
Preceded by Ricardo Wall	Secretary of State (Chief Minister); 1763–1777	Succeeded by Count of Floridablanca
Spanish nobility
Preceded by New creation	Duke of Grimaldi; 1777–1789	Succeeded by Francisco Grimaldi
