= Colegio Pestalozzi =

Colegio Pestalozzi or Pestalozzi Schule may refer to:

- Colegio Pestalozzi (Argentina) (German school)
- Colegio Pestalozzi (Peru) (Swiss school)
