= Portrait of José Nicolás de Azara =

Painting by Anton Raphael Mengs

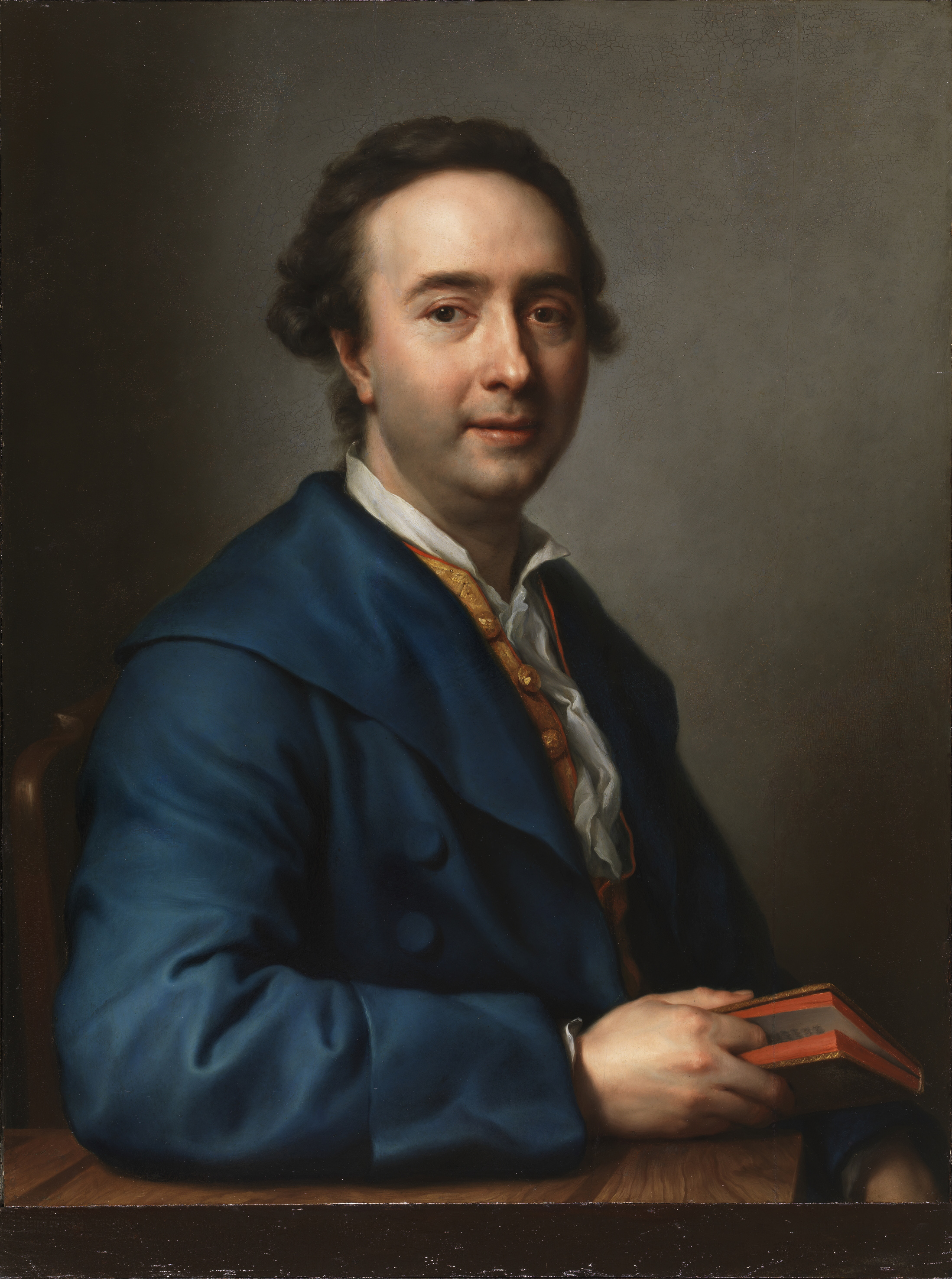
- Artist: Anton Raphael Mengs
- Year: 1774
- Medium: Oil on poplar panel
- Dimensions: 77 cm × 61.5 cm (30 in × 24.2 in)
- Location: Museo del Prado, Madrid

Portrait of José Nicolás de Azara is a 1773–1774 oil on poplar panel portrait by Anton Raphael Mengs. It shows the Spanish diplomat José Nicolás de Azara, a friend of the artist and was completed in Florence in January 1774.

Azara also commissioned Domenico Cunego to engrave the portrait in burin and drypoint in 1781 from a drawing by Francisco Javier Ramos, a Spanish artist who had studied with Mengs. It was also engraved in 1784 by Jacopo Bossi, again in Rome, for inclusion in an Italian translation of Johann Joachim Winckelmann's History of the Art of Antiquity dedicated to Azara by Winckelmann himself. The painting remained in the subject's family after his death and between 1928 and 1976 they loaned it to the Museum of Fine Arts of Zaragoza.

The painting was bought by the Museo del Prado in November 2012 for €180,000 from Azara's descendants.

Another version of the portrait, virtually identical and considered Mengs' autograph, although painted on canvas, is exhibited at the Getty Center, in Los Angeles. It was donated to the museum in 2019.
