= Johann Heinrich Pestalozzi =

Swiss pedagogue and educational reformer (1746–1827)

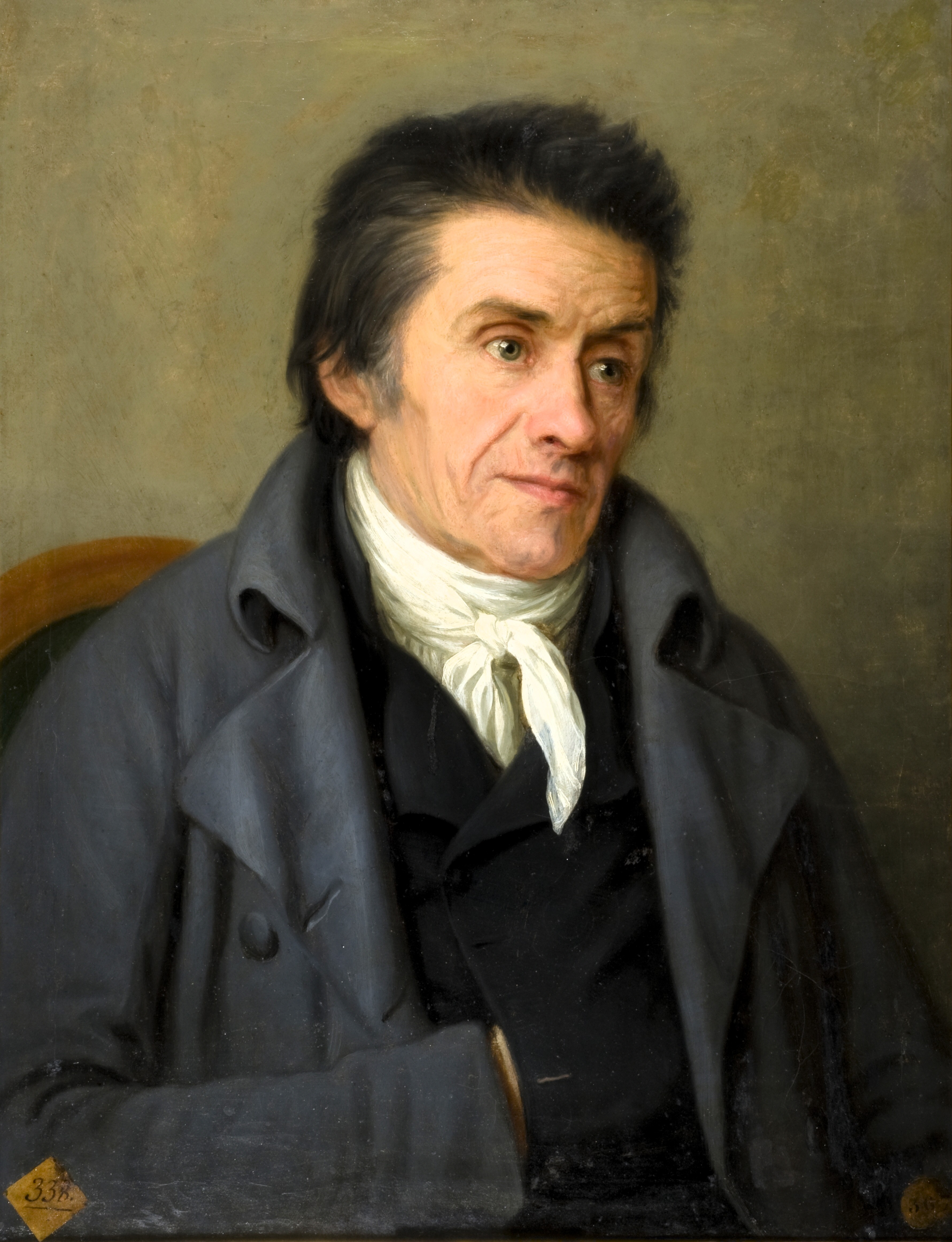
- Portrait by Francisco Javier Ramos, Real Academia de Bellas Artes de San Fernando, Madrid (c. 1806)
- Born: 12 January 1746; Zürich, Switzerland
- Died: 17 February 1827 (aged 81); Brugg, Switzerland

Philosophical work
- Era: 19th-century philosophy
- Region: Western philosophy
- School: German Romanticism
- Notable ideas: Four-sphere concept of life

Johann Heinrich Pestalozzi (/pɛstəˈlɒtsi/ pes-tuh-LOT-see; German: [ˈjoːhan ˈhaɪnrɪç pɛstaˈlɔtsiː]; Italian: [pestaˈlɔttsi]; 12 January 1746 – 17 February 1827) was a Swiss pedagogue and educational reformer who exemplified Romanticism in his approach.

He founded several educational institutions both in German- and French-speaking regions of Switzerland and wrote many works explaining his revolutionary modern principles of education. His motto was "Learning by head, hand and heart". Thanks to Pestalozzi, illiteracy in 18th-century Switzerland was overcome almost completely by 1830.

== Life ==
=== Early years, 1746–1765 ===
Coat of arms of Pestalozzi's family from Zürich

Pestalozzi was born on 12 January 1746, in Zürich, Switzerland. His father was a surgeon and oculist who died at age 33 when Pestalozzi, the second of three children, was five years old; he belonged to a family who had fled the area around Locarno due to its Protestant faith. His mother, whose maiden name was Hotze, was a native of Wädenswil on the lake of Zürich. The family also had a maid, Barbara Schmid, nicknamed Babeli. After the death of Pestalozzi's father it was only through the help of Babeli that Pestalozzi's mother could financially support the family.

In 1761, Pestalozzi attended the Gymnasium (Collegium Humanitatis) and received instruction from educators Johann Jakob Bodmer, who taught history and politics, and Johann Jakob Breitinger, who taught Greek and Hebrew.

On holidays Pestalozzi would visit his maternal grandfather, a clergyman in Höngg. Together they would travel to schools and the houses of parishioners. It was through these visits that Pestalozzi learned the poverty of country peasants. He saw the consequences of putting children to work in factories at an early age and he saw how little the Catechism schools did for them. Their ignorance, suffering and inability to help themselves left an impression on Pestalozzi, an impression that would guide his future educational ideas.

Pestalozzi was educated to become a clergyman. As a clergyman, he expected to have ample opportunity to carry out his educational ideas; however, the failure of his first sermon and influence from philosopher Jean-Jacques Rousseau led him to pursue a career in law and political justice.

The ideal system of liberty, also, to which Rousseau imparted fresh animation, increased in me the visionary desire for a more extended sphere of activity, in which I might promote the welfare and happiness of the people. Juvenile ideas as to what it was necessary and possible to do in this respect in my native town, induced me to abandon the clerical profession, to which I had formerly leaned, and for which I had been destined, and caused the thought to spring up within me, that it might be possible, by the study of the law, to find a career that would be likely to procure for me, sooner or later, the opportunity and means of exercising an active influence on the civil condition of my native town, and even of my native land.

— Johann Heinrich Pestalozzi

=== Young adulthood and early political aspirations, 1765–1767 ===
During the mid-18th century the government in Switzerland condemned Rousseau's Emile and Social Contract, saying they were dangerous to the State and the Christian religion. A prison sentence was issued upon Rousseau. Bodmer, Pestalozzi's former professor, embraced the teachings of Rousseau and founded the Helvetic Society with about 20 other philosophers in 1765. Their goal was the advancement of freedom. The 19-year-old Pestalozzi was an active member, contributing many articles to the Society's newspaper, Der Erinnerer.

Pestalozzi brought to light several cases of official corruption and was believed to be an accessory to the escape of a fellow newspaper contributor. Although he was later proven innocent, he was under arrest for three days. These events caused Pestalozzi to have many political enemies and destroyed any hope of a legal career.

=== Neuhof, 1769–1779 ===
After the failure of his political aspirations and at the suggestion of several friends, Pestalozzi decided to become a farmer. During this time, Johann Rudolf Tschiffeli, who was also a member of the Helvetic Society, attracted widespread attention regarding his successful business model. He had converted a large plot of worthless land into several valuable farms. In 1767 Pestalozzi visited Tschiffeli to learn about his method. After a year with Tschiffeli, Pestalozzi purchased 15 acres of waste land in the neighborhood of Zürich. He obtained financial support from a Zürich banker, bought more land and, in 1769, he married Anna Schulthess.

Pestalozzi began to build a house on the heavily mortgaged property, calling it "Neuhof". The land he had bought, however, was unsuitable to farm. Unfavorable reports led the banker to withdraw his support. Pestalozzi added a wool-spinning business to the farm, hoping to improve his financial situation. The challenges increased as much as his debt. Three months after their financial support was withdrawn, Schulthess gave birth to the couple's only son, Jean-Jacques Pestalozzi. He was nicknamed Schaggeli and often had epileptic fits that led Pestalozzi and Schulthess to worry constantly about his health.

==== Transition from farm to industrial school at Neuhof ====
After the failure of his farming venture, Pestalozzi wanted to help the poor. He had been poor himself most of his life and had observed orphans who gained apprenticeships as farmers only to be overworked and underfed. He desired to teach them how to live self-respecting lives. This led him to the conception of converting Neuhof into an industrial school. Against the wishes of his wife's family, Pestalozzi gained the support of philosopher Isaak Iselin of Basel, who published it in Die Ephemerides, a periodical devoted to social and economic questions. The publication led to subscriptions and loans free of interest. The new foundation had a short period of apparent prosperity, but after a year Pestalozzi's old faults again led the institution to near ruin. An appeal for public support in 1777 brought much-needed help, and Pestalozzi contributed to the periodical a series of letters on the education of the poor. The appeal, however, only postponed the failure of the institution. In 1779, Pestalozzi had to close Neuhof. With help from his friends, Pestalozzi was able to save the house at Neuhof for himself and his family to live in. Despite the property being saved, they were in financial ruin and were reduced to poverty. His family connections abandoned him, along with most people who had shown interest in his ideas.

=== Period of literary activity, 1780–1797 ===
==== The Evening Hours of a Hermit, 1780 ====
Iselin remained a friend of Pestalozzi and encouraged him to continue writing. In 1780 Pestalozzi published anonymously in Die Ephemerides, a series of aphorisms entitled The Evening Hours of a Hermit. They are his earliest works which outline ideas that would later be known as Pestalozzian. The aphorisms attracted little attention at the time of publication.

==== Leonard and Gertrude, 1781, 1783, 1785, 1787 ====
Pestalozzi knew the country peasant life much more intimately than his contemporaries did, from the visits of his childhood with his grandfather to his current state of poverty. He drew from these experiences and published four volumes of a story titled Leonard and Gertrude. These four volumes revolve around the lives of four characters: Gertrude, Glüphi, an unnamed parish clergyman and Arner. Gertrude is a wife and mother from the village of Bonnal, who teaches her children how to live moral upstanding lives through the belief and love of God. Glüphi, a school teacher, sees the success Gertrude has with her children and tries to model his school around her teachings. A parish clergyman also adopts Gertrude's teachings and the work of Gertrude, Glüphi and the clergyman are helped by Arner, a politician, who solicits aid from the state. Through these four institutions, harmony is achieved and a comprehensive education is offered to all people.

The first volume was very successful; however, the second through fourth volumes were not widely published or read.

===== Fifth and sixth volumes =====
Pestalozzi had planned a fifth and sixth volume, but the manuscript of the fifth was lost in his 1804 trip to Paris and it is not known if a sixth was ever written.

==== Christopher and Elizabeth and the Schweizerblatt, 1782 ====
Pestalozzi wrote Christopher and Elizabeth in 1782 as a series of evening conversations to address social and political corruption. A weekly newspaper called the Schweizerblatt was also founded and disbanded during the same year with Pestalozzi briefly acting as the chief editor.

==== Enquiries into the Course of Nature in the Development of the Human Race, 1797 ====
In 1794 Pestalozzi visited his sister in Leipzig. During the visit, he met Johann Wolfgang von Goethe, Christoph Martin Wieland and Johann Gottfried Herder. On his return trip to Neuhof, he met Johann Gottlieb Fichte. Fichte saw in Pestalozzi's ideas the key to the solution of the educational problem, and suggested to Pestalozzi that he write about his views on human nature and the problem of its development. After three years, Pestalozzi wrote and published Enquiries into the Course of Nature in the development of the Human Race. Few people read his work, and in an 1821 edition, Pestalozzi wrote: "Scarcely any one has noticed the book, although it has been before the public for more than twenty years."

This work marked the end of his eighteen-year literary period, during which time Pestalozzi and his family lived a life of poverty. His wife was often ill, and in 1797 his son returned home from his apprenticeship in Basel in a similar state of health.

=== Stans, 1799 ===
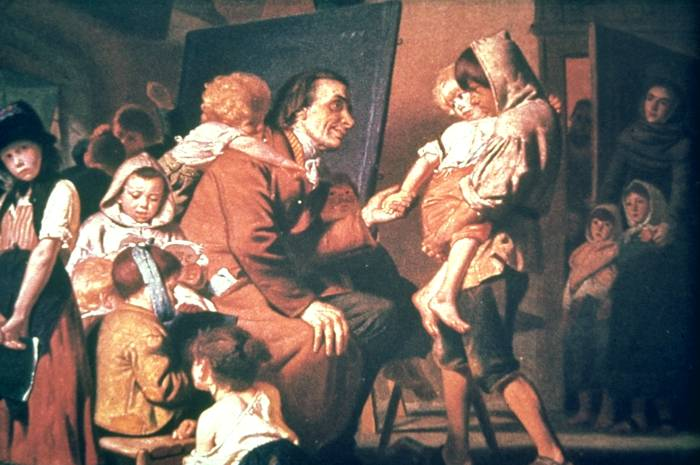
Grob, Konrad (1879), Pestalozzi with the orphans in Stans (oil on canvas painting)

Political changes were taking place, and when serfdom was abolished in Switzerland in 1798, Pestalozzi decided to become an educator. He wrote a plan for a school and submitted it to Philipp Albert Stapfer, the new Minister of Arts and Sciences, who approved of Pestalozzi's plan. Pestalozzi was not able to implement his new school right away, because a suitable site could not be found quickly enough. In the meantime, Pestalozzi was asked to take charge of a government newspaper, the Helvetisches Volksblatt, in hopes that he could win the acceptance of the people of Switzerland. Political change of any kind during this period was viewed as tyrannical.

When the French army invaded the town of Stans in 1798, many children were left without a home or family. The Swiss government established an orphanage and recruited Pestalozzi on 5 December 1798, to take charge of the newly formed institution. On 7 December, Pestalozzi went to Stans, writing:

I went gladly, for I hoped to offer these innocent little ones some compensation for the loss they had sustained, and to find in their wretchedness a basis for their gratitude. In my zeal to put my hands to the task which had been the great dream of my life, I should have been ready to begin even in the highest Alps and without fire and water, so to speak, had I only been allowed.

— Johann Heinrich Pestalozzi

The buildings of the Ursuline Convent at Stans were supposed to have been converted into an orphanage, but little had been done when Pestalozzi arrived. On 14 January 1799, a number of orphans came to the newly established institution. Pestalozzi wrote, "They were in a dreadful condition, both of body and of mind". He took many roles at Stans, including a master, servant, father, guardian, sick-nurse and teacher. He had no school materials and his only assistant was a housekeeper.

Drawing from previous experience, his aim at Stans was similar to that of Neuhof: the combination of education and industry. However, he no longer looked at the products of the children's labors as a possible source of income. Any work was considered by Pestalozzi as a way to train physical dexterity, promote efficiency and encourage mutual helpfulness. He wanted to cultivate the fundamental activities of the mind—"the powers of attention, observation, and memory, which must precede the art of judgment and must be well established before the latter is exercised." It was during his time at Stans that Pestalozzi realized the significance of a universal method of education, which he would attempt to apply at future institutions.

In June 1799, the French army, after being defeated by the Austrians, took back Stans. They needed every available building to house their troops, and the school was broken up. Even during the short time of the orphanage, Pestalozzi's success was apparent in the well-being of the children. He left Stans in order to recover in Gurnigel, an Alpine health resort, hoping to return to the orphanage when the buildings were free, but he was not permitted to return.

=== Burgdorf, 1800–1804 ===
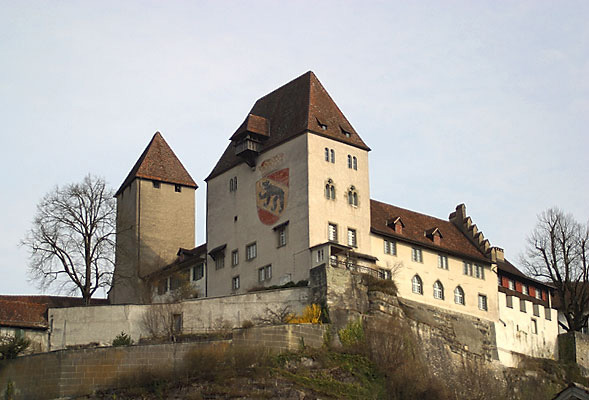
The Burgdorf Castle where Pestalozzi ran his institute from 1800 to 1804

During his recovery in Gurnigel, Stapfer assigned Pestalozzi to the town of Burgdorf. He was to receive a small quarterly salary, an apartment and a position teaching at the lowest school in town. Pestalozzi's position was not held long; the shoemaker who ran the school before Pestalozzi had arrived did not agree with his ideas. Shortly after, Pestalozzi was able to transfer to a different school. The children were five to eight years old. Pestalozzi was nervous at first, but he continued his investigations and experiments in education carried out at Stans.

A book was suggested to Pestalozzi by a friend, Herbart, Johann Friedrich, Vous voulez mécaniser l'education [The Application of Psychology to the Science of Education] (in French). Although Pestalozzi said he did not know much French, what he was able to understand "threw a flood of light upon my whole endeavor". It confirmed his ideas of education that he had developed at Neuhof, Stans, and now Burgdorf, in which all understanding can be achieved through a psychologically ordered sequence.

In January 1800, a young teaching assistant, Hermann Krüsi, offered to help Pestalozzi. Krüsi already had some practical teaching experience and followed the example set by Pestalozzi. After eight months of teaching, Pestalozzi was evaluated by school authorities who praised him for his progress. In eight months, he had not only taught children of five and six years of age to read perfectly, but also to write, draw and understand arithmetic. The school board promoted Pestalozzi to a mastership in the second boys' school where he continued his educational experiments.

Fueled by his success, in October 1800 Pestalozzi decided to open another school in Burgdorf, the "Educational Institute for the Children of the Middle Classes", in the Burgdorf Castle. Here, two educators joined Pestalozzi, Johann Georg Tobler and Johann Christoff Büss. During this time Pestalozzi systemized and codified many of his methods and ideas about education.

==== How Gertrude Teaches her Children, 1801 ====
Pestalozzi for the second time in his literary career attracted a wide circle of readers after publishing How Gertrude Teaches her Children. The book had a profound impact on the opinion and practice of education. It is written in the form of fourteen letters from Pestalozzi to his friend Heinrich Gessner, a bookseller in Berne. The first three letters describe how he, Krüsi, Tobler, and Büss came to their present situation at Burgdorf. Letters four to eleven are his reflections and experience in pedagogical instruction and educational theory. The twelfth letter is about physical education while the last two letters talk about moral and religious education. Pestalozzi's purpose in these letters was to show that, by reducing knowledge to its elements and by constructing a series of psychologically ordered exercises, anybody could teach their children effectively.

Because of this literary success, people from all parts of Switzerland and Germany came to see the school in Burgdorf. The school grew, but Pestalozzi still felt that he was not doing enough. Though a financial success, the school could not do what Pestalozzi desired: educate the poor. He communicated to the Swiss government that he would like more opportunity to educate the poor. In response it sent two commissioners to investigate his work and, following their favorable review, the government decided to transform Pestalozzi's school into a national institution. Staff would receive fixed salaries and money would be spent to publish textbooks written by Pestalozzi and his staff. Using this money, in 1803 Pestalozzi published three elementary books: The ABC of Sense Perception, Lessons on the Observation of Number Relations and The Mother's Book.

Two additions were made to Pestalozzi's staff during this time: Johann Joseph Schmid (1785–1851) and Johannes Niederer (1779–1843). Schmid had been at the institute as a poor pupil but was added to the staff for his teaching ability. Niederer had formerly been a minister.

Pestalozzi's family finally joined him in the institute to live and work. In 1801 Pestalozzi's son, Jean-Jacques, died at the age of 31, but his daughter-in-law and grandchild, Gottlieb, moved from Neuhof to Burgdorf to live at the institute.

==== Trip to Paris, 1804 ====
Political changes by Napoleon during this time put Pestalozzi's institute in jeopardy through reform in the Swiss government. A national deputation was sent to Paris to interview Napoleon on behalf of Switzerland. Pestalozzi was elected as a member of this deputation. Before going, he published his ideas about political effort. It is a unique document in Pestalozzi's work that shows the connection of his political, social and educational influence. Pestalozzi did not enjoy his time in Paris; Napoleon had no interest in his work.

On his return, Pestalozzi found the new Swiss government questioning his right to use the facilities at Burgdorf. They notified him that his services were no longer needed on the grounds that the buildings were needed for their own officials. To avoid being criticized by the public, however, the authorities offered Pestalozzi the use of an old monastery in Münchenbuchsee. Pestalozzi received offers to establish his institute in other towns, but ultimately he decided to accept the Government's offer and, in June 1804, Pestalozzi's work in Burgdorf ended.

=== Münchenbuchsee, 1804–1805 ===
Pestalozzi's stay at Münchenbuchsee was short. Nearby in Hofwil, there was another educational establishment run by Philipp Emanuel von Fellenberg. Pestalozzi's colleagues convinced him to collaborate with Fellenberg to plan the new institute at Münchenbuchsee. Pestalozzi and Fellenberg did not get along and after months of planning it was decided to move the institute to Yverdon.

=== Yverdon, 1805–1825 ===
By far, the institute at Yverdon was the longest lasting of Pestalozzi's endeavors. Pestalozzi spent the first few months of his stay at Yverdon in quiet literary work, thanks to a monetary gift from the King of Denmark, Christian VII. During this time he wrote Views and Experiences relating to the idea of Elementary Education.

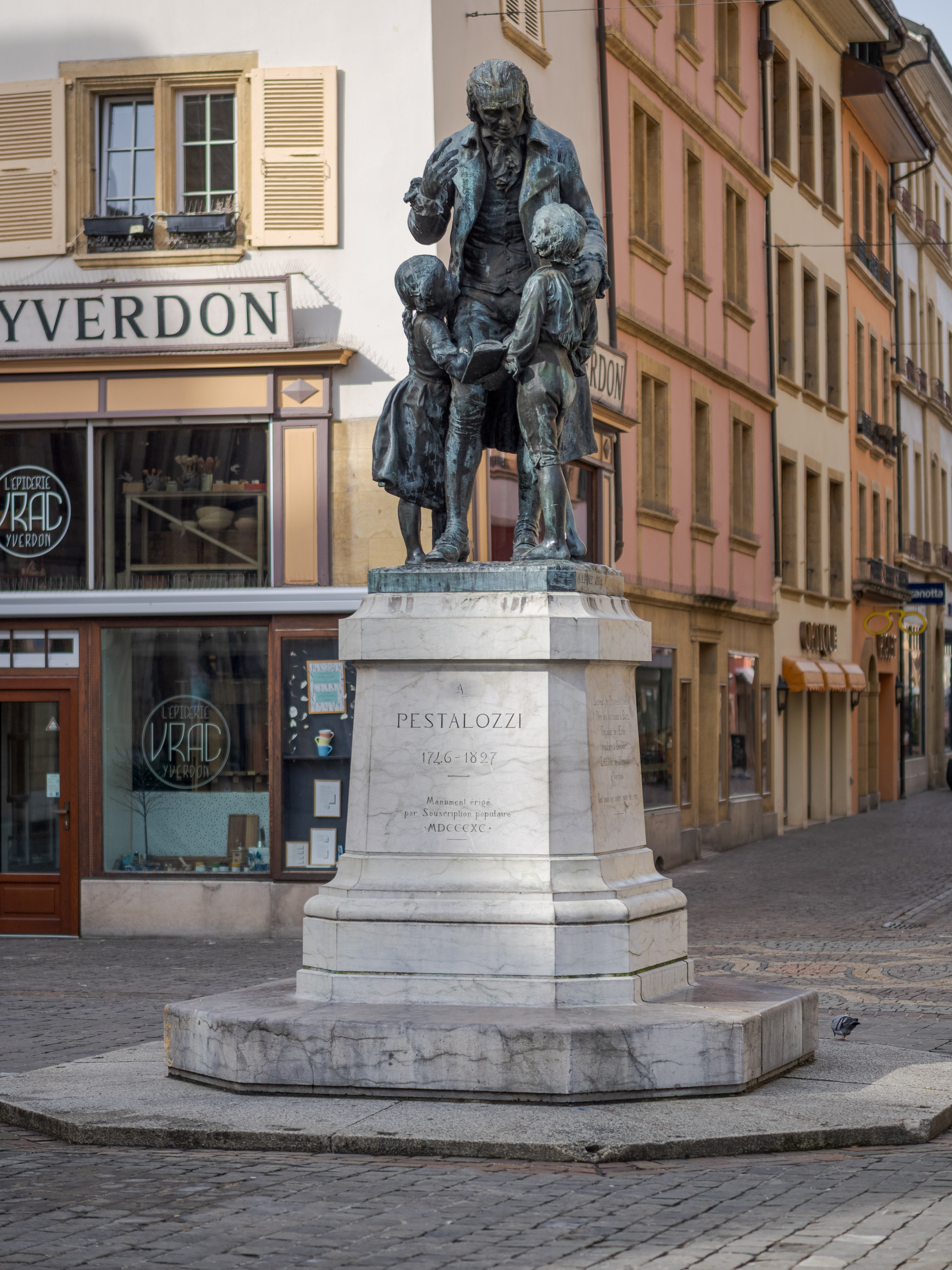
Memorial in Yverdon

In July 1805 the institute at Yverdon opened and attracted visitors and pupils from all over Europe. Many governments sent their own educators to study with Pestalozzi with the desire to implement a similar system in their own nations. In May 1807, Die Wochenschrift fur Menschenbildung, a newspaper published by the institute, was started by Niederer and regularly included philosophical discussions about education and reports to parents and the public about the institute's progress. Some notable changes to the institute at Yverdon were that pupils of any age were educated, not just young children; German, French, Latin and Greek were taught along with geography, natural history, history, literature, arithmetic, geometry, surveying, drawing, writing and singing. At the height of the institution's fame Pestalozzi was highly regarded for his work as an educator and in educational reform.

As time went on, Pestalozzi felt that his colleagues were growing farther apart, something he called the "canker of disunion". Disagreement had not yet developed into open conflict, but different views about policy were represented by Niederer and Schmid. Niederer had gained influence in the institution and started to add subjects that teachers were not competent to teach. Schmid was open about his criticisms and the division grew among the institute's staff. In 1809 and 1810 the criticism was so great that Niederer suggested to Pestalozzi that an impartial commission be brought in from the Government to assess the conduct and efficiency of the institute. Against Schmid's wishes, Pestalozzi agreed, and in 1810 the state commissioners visited Yverdon. The commissioners' report looked favorably upon Pestalozzi's ideas but not on the practices of the institute. Any hope of Yverdon becoming a state institution was cut off.

Pestalozzi felt that justice had not been done. Schmid resigned his post and neither Pestalozzi nor Niederer could fill his position as teacher of mathematics, so instead they opened a printing and bookselling business. This proved to be a financial failure, and only through the help of friends was the institute able to stay on its feet until 1815, when Schmid returned. During the period of Schmid's absence, Pestalozzi wrote Swansong, a restatement of his educational doctrines, and Life's Destiny, a review of his life's work. These were not published until 1826 when they were joined into one book called Pestalozzi's Swansong. In 1814 he also wrote an article titled "To the Innocent, Serious, and Magnanimous of my Fatherland", a testimony to the many people living in poverty which his institutions could not reach.

After the death of Pestalozzi's wife in 1815, Krüsi resigned from the institute. Niederer followed in 1817. Overcome by troubles, Pestalozzi sought Schmid's help. Schmid managed to raise £2,500 by publishing a compilation of Pestalozzi's works. The institute remained open for another 10 years, during which time Pestalozzi tried to convince Krüsi and Niederer to return. In 1825 the institute had to be closed due to a lack of funds.

=== Death ===
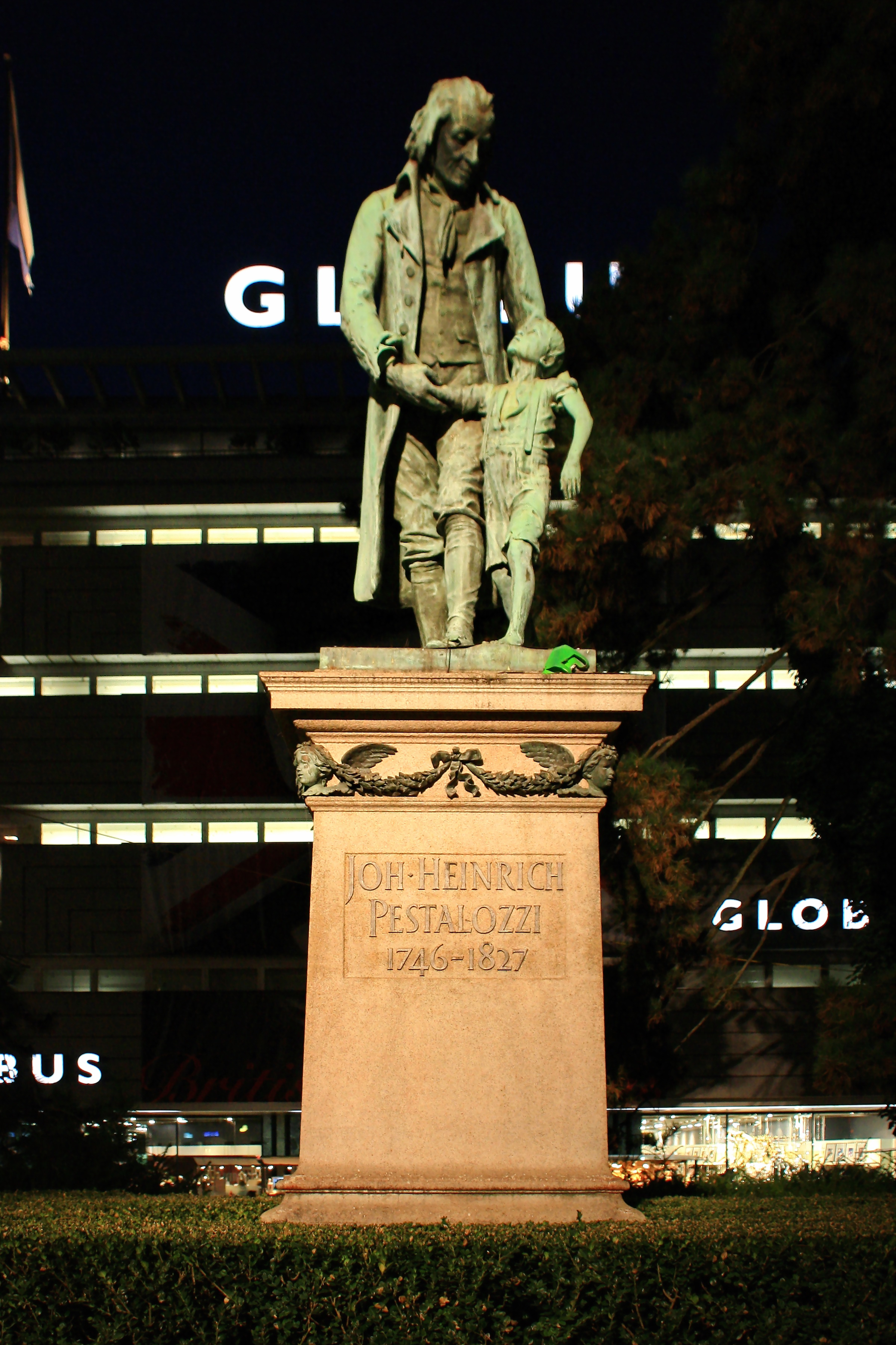
Memorial at Pestalozziwiese (Bahnhofstrasse) in Zurich, Switzerland

Pestalozzi returned to his old home at Neuhof and published Pestalozzi's Swansong. This provoked many bitter responses, by Fellenberg and Niederer in particular. Pestalozzi did not take lightly to these criticisms. He became sick on 15 February 1827, and died two days later in Brugg on 17 February 1827. His last words were, "I forgive my enemies. May they now find peace to which I am going forever."

The inscription on Pestalozzi's grave reads:

Heinrich Pestalozzi:
born in Zurich January 12, 1746
died in Brugg February 17, 1827
Saviour of the Poor on the Neuhof.
Preacher to the People in Leonard and Gertrude
In Stans, Father of the orphan,
In Burgdorf and Münchenbuchsee,
Founder of the New Primary Education.
In Yverdon, Educator of Humanity.
He was an individual, a Christian and a citizen.
He did everything for others, nothing for himself!
Bless his name!

== Ideas ==
Pestalozzi was a Romantic who felt that education must be broken down to its elements in order to have a complete understanding of it. Based on what he had learnt by operating schools at Neuhof, Stans, Burgdorf and Yverdon, Pestalozzi emphasized that every aspect of the child's life contributed to the formation of the child's personality, character, and capacity to reason. His educational methods were child-centered and based on individual differences, sense perception, and the student's self-activity. He worked in Yverdon to "elementarize" the teaching of ancient languages, principally Latin, but also Hebrew and Greek. In 1819, Stephan Ludwig Roth came to study with Pestalozzi, and his new humanism contributed to the development of the method of language teaching, including considerations such as the function of the mother tongue in the teaching of ancient languages. Pestalozzi and Niederer were important influences on the theory of physical education; they developed a regimen of physical exercise and outdoor activity linked to general, moral and intellectual education that reflected Pestalozzi's ideal of harmony and human autonomy.

Pestalozzi's philosophy of education was based on a four-sphere concept of life and the premise that human nature was essentially good. The first three "exterior" spheres—home and family, vocational and individual self-determination, and state and nation—recognized the family, the utility of individuality, and the applicability of the parent-child relationship to society as a whole in the development of a child's character, attitude toward learning, and sense of duty. The last "exterior" sphere—inner sense—posited that education, having provided a means of satisfying one's basic needs, results in inner peace and a keen belief in God.

== Legacy ==
As Pestalozzi said himself, the real work of his life did not lie in Burgdorf or in Yverdon. It lay in the principles of education which he practised, in the development of his observation, in the training of the whole person, and in the sympathetic way of dealing with students, principles and practices which he illustrated in his six months' labors at Stans. He had the deepest effect on all branches of education, and his influence continues.

Friedrich Fröbel, the creator of the concept of the kindergarten, was a student of Pestalozzi. Pestalozzi's ideas inspired Charles Mayo who returned from Switzerland to work with his sister Elizabeth Mayo. Charles had lived with Pestalozzi from 1819 to 1822 at Yverdon. The two siblings were credited with founding the formal education of infant teachers in Britain.

Schools that are named after Pestalozzi include Pestalozzi-Gymnasium Biberach and Pestalozzischule Raunheim in Germany, Johann Heinrich Pestalozzi (Macedonian: Јохан Хајнрих Песталоци) Elementary School in Skopje, North Macedonia, Colegio Pestalozzi in Argentina, Asociación Colegio Pestalozzi in Peru, and the Johann Pestalozzi Bilingual Academy in Aibonito, Puerto Rico, US. In fact, when the Swiss government joined the international rebuilding effort after the devastating 1963 Skopje earthquake by donating funds for the construction of a school in Skopje, it enrolled the famous Swiss architect Alfred Roth to design the new school, equipped it with the first modern application of seismic isolation, and named it after the Swiss pedagogue.

The Pestalozzi-Stiftung Hamburg, created in 1847, runs child day care centers and residential homes.

Pestalozzi's method was used by the Old Cantonal School Aarau that Albert Einstein attended, and which has been credited with fostering Einstein's process of visualizing problems and his use of "thought experiments". Einstein said of his education at Aarau, "It made me clearly realize how much superior an education based on free action and personal responsibility is to one relying on outward authority."

The British charity Pestalozzi International sponsors students from developing countries to study in their countries of origin.

Today the Pestalozzi-Fröbel-Haus in Berlin continues to train nursery school teachers.

Pestalozzianum in Zürich was named after Pestalozzi and was established in 1875. Based in Zürich, the foundation promoted the school teacher's instruction and postgraduate training. In 2003 it was renamed in Stiftung Pestalozzianum as its teacher-oriented objectives were integrated in the new model of university-like Fachhochschule colleges that was introduced in Switzerland in 2002.

Kinderdorf Pestalozzi in Trogen, Switzerland, was established as a foundation in 1945 to provide the Kinderdorf (children's village) for war-affected children. In 1946 the foundation stone in the municipality of Trogen in the Canton of Appenzell Ausserrhoden was laid, and in the same year children from war-torn countries settled the first houses. From 1960, in addition to European children, war orphans from Tibet lived at the orphanage, later mostly children from Korea, Tunisia, Ethiopia, Vietnam, Cambodia and Lebanon, and orphans from Switzerland since 1983. The length of stay varies from a few weeks (educational or recreational reasons) up to several years. As of 2012, the projects of the foundation benefited 321,000 children and adolescents in Switzerland and abroad.

The 1989 film Pestalozzi's Mountain is a biopic about his life and career. Gian Maria Volonté plays the part of Pestalozzi.

A prominent street in St. Louis, Missouri, U.S.A., is named for him.

== See also ==
- Education in Switzerland
- Jan Amos Komenský
- Johann Julius Hecker
- Johann Ignaz von Felbiger
- Maria Montessori
