= Konrad Grob =

Swiss painter (1828–1904)

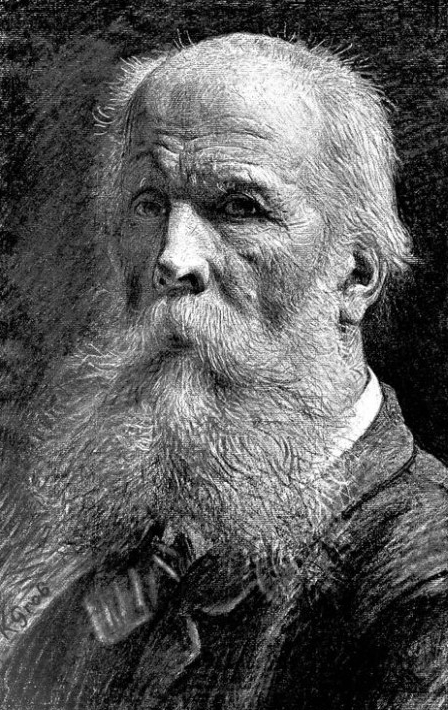
- Self-portrait, 1900
- Born: 3 September 1828; Andelfingen, Switzerland
- Died: 9 January 1904 (aged 75); Munich, Germany
- Known for: Painting, etching, lithography
- Notable work: Pestalozzi with the Orphans of Stans

Konrad Grob (3 September 1828 – 9 January 1904) was a Swiss painter, etcher and lithographer. After training in lithography in Winterthur, he studied at the Academy of Fine Arts in Munich and later opened a studio there. He was best received for genre paintings of rural life and Swiss folk customs. His 1879 painting Pestalozzi with the Orphans of Stans was an important contribution to Swiss history painting.

== Biography ==
Grob was born in Andelfingen in the canton of Zurich on 3 September 1828. He grew up in Veltheim, now part of Winterthur. From 1842 to 1845, support from citizens of Andelfingen enabled him to undertake a lithography apprenticeship in Winterthur. He then worked as a lithographer in several places, including St. Gallen, Verona and Naples, where he remained until 1865 with the firm Richter & Co.

Grob moved to Munich in 1865 and continued his training at the Academy of Fine Arts. In 1870, he entered the class of Arthur von Ramberg. Grob later opened his own studio in Munich. He died in Munich on 9 January 1904.

== Work ==
Grob produced paintings, etchings and lithographs. His genre paintings depicted rural life, domestic interiors and Swiss folk customs, subjects that were well received by his contemporaries.

He was less successful as a history painter. His historical work The Battle of Sempach was shown at the Paris Exposition in 1878, but failed to receive an award. Nevertheless, his 1879 painting Pestalozzi with the Orphans of Stans (German: Pestalozzi bei den Waisen von Stans) was an important contribution to Swiss history painting.

His works are held in collections including the Öffentliche Kunstsammlung Basel, Kunstmuseum St. Gallen, Kunstmuseum Winterthur and Kunsthaus Zürich.

== Gallery ==
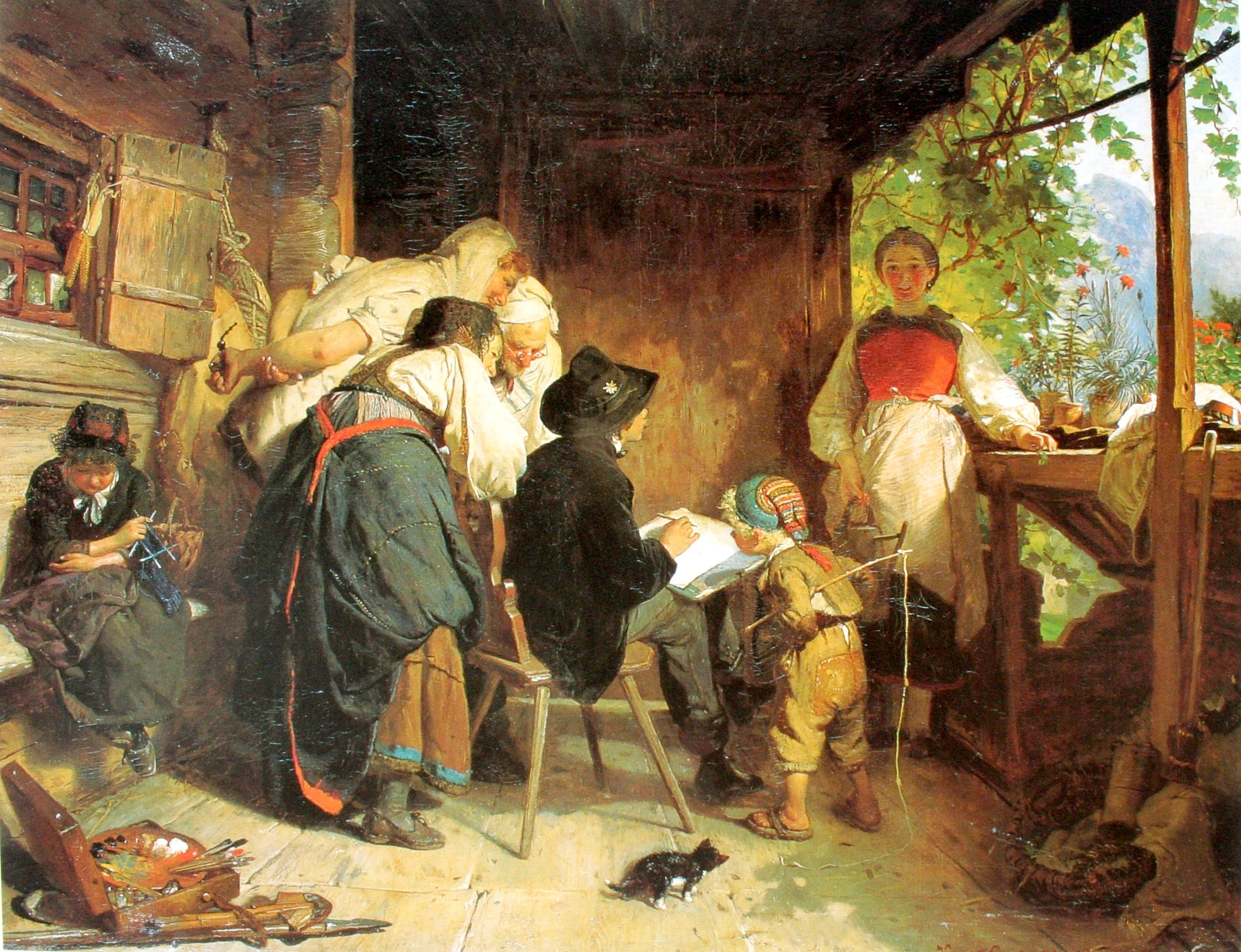
The Painter on a Study Trip, 1872

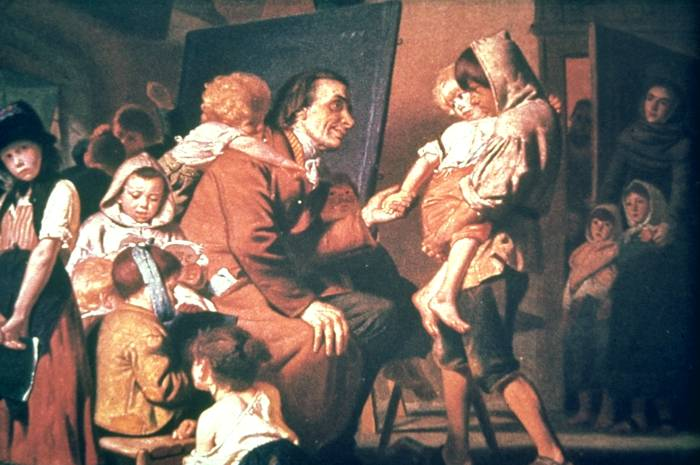
Pestalozzi with the Orphans of Stans, 1879

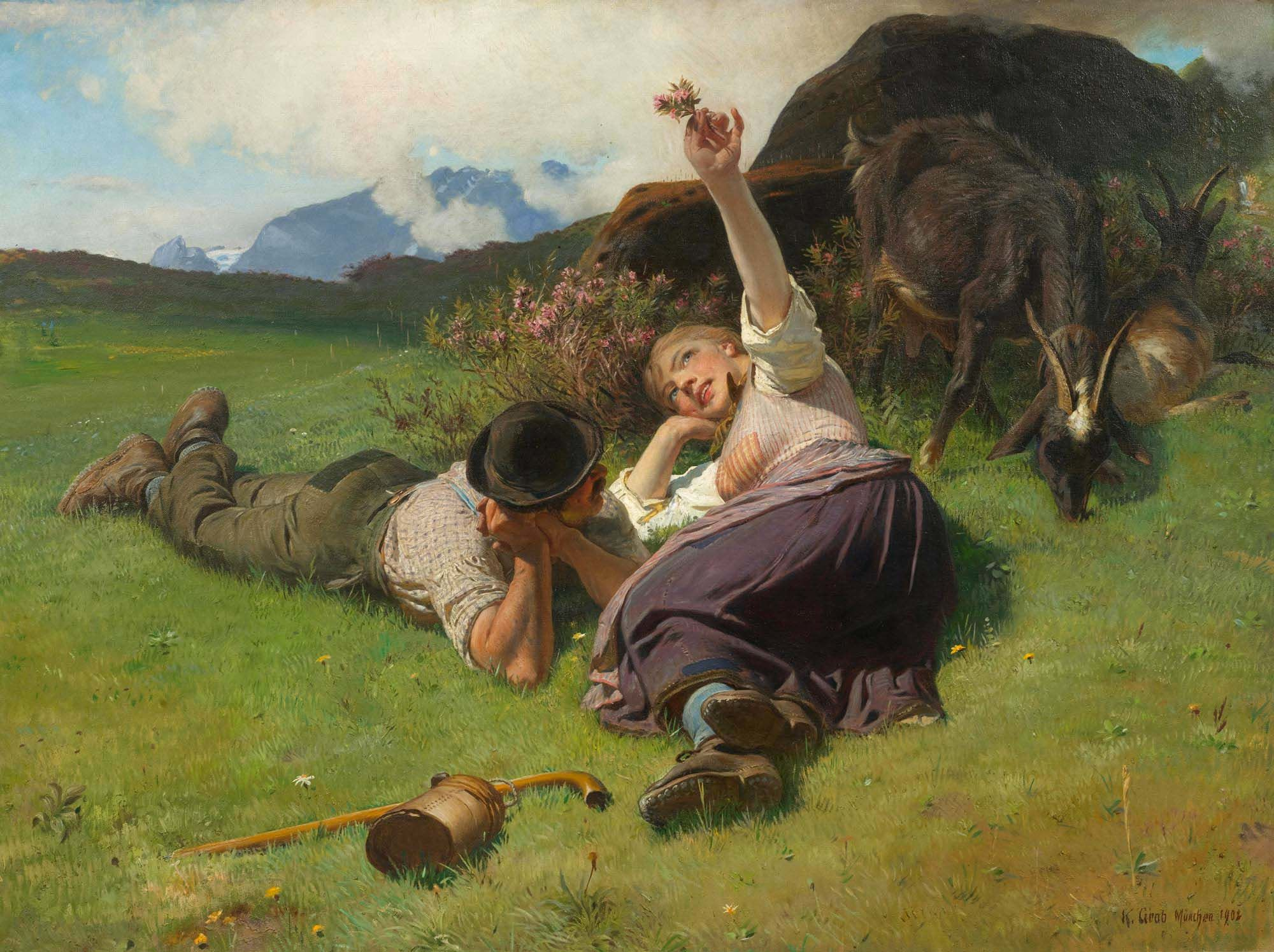
Alpine Idyll, 1902
