= Dorsum Azara =

Wrinkle ridge on the Moon

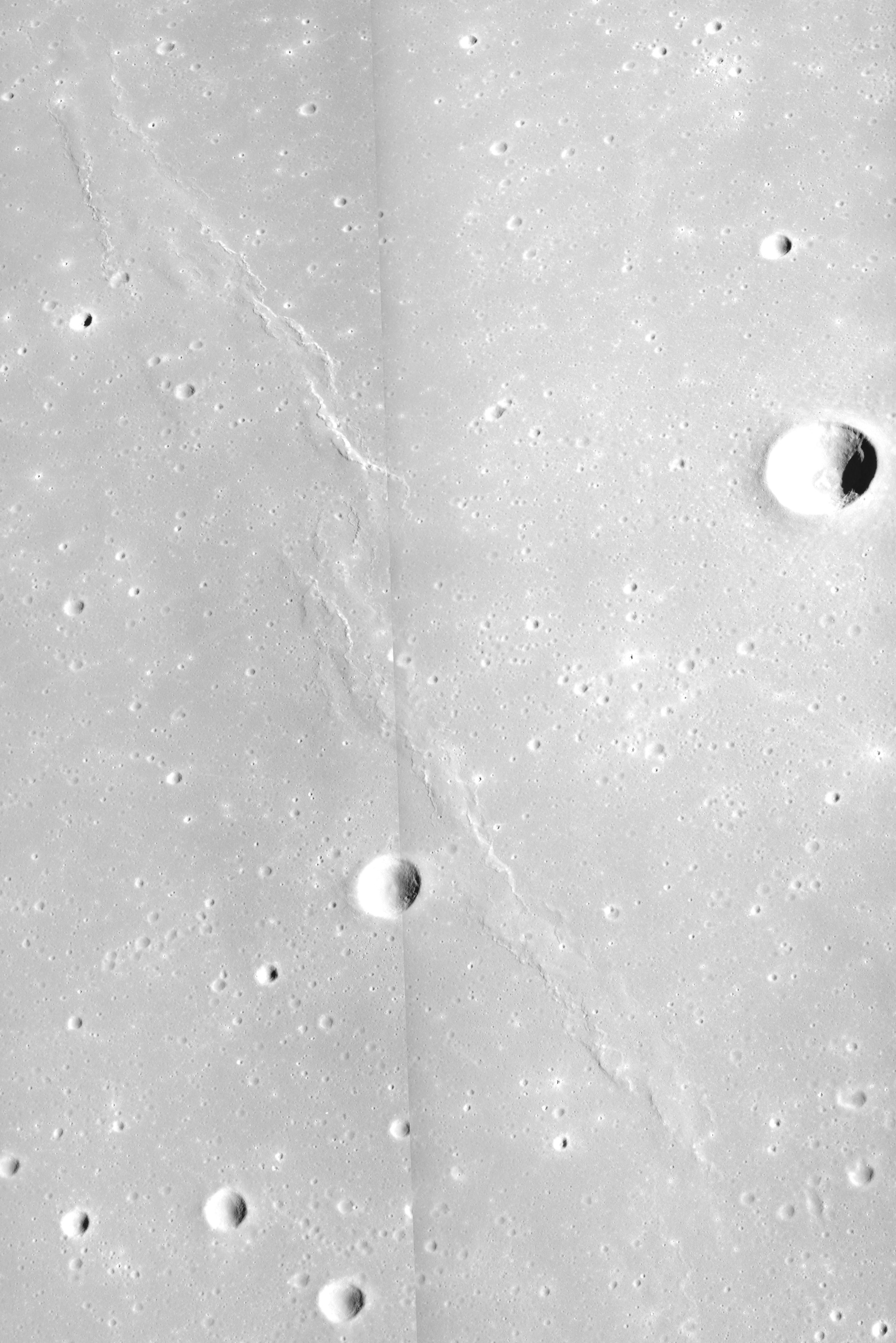
Mosaic of Apollo 15 images showing Dorsum Azara, facing north. Bessel D is the largest crater at right.

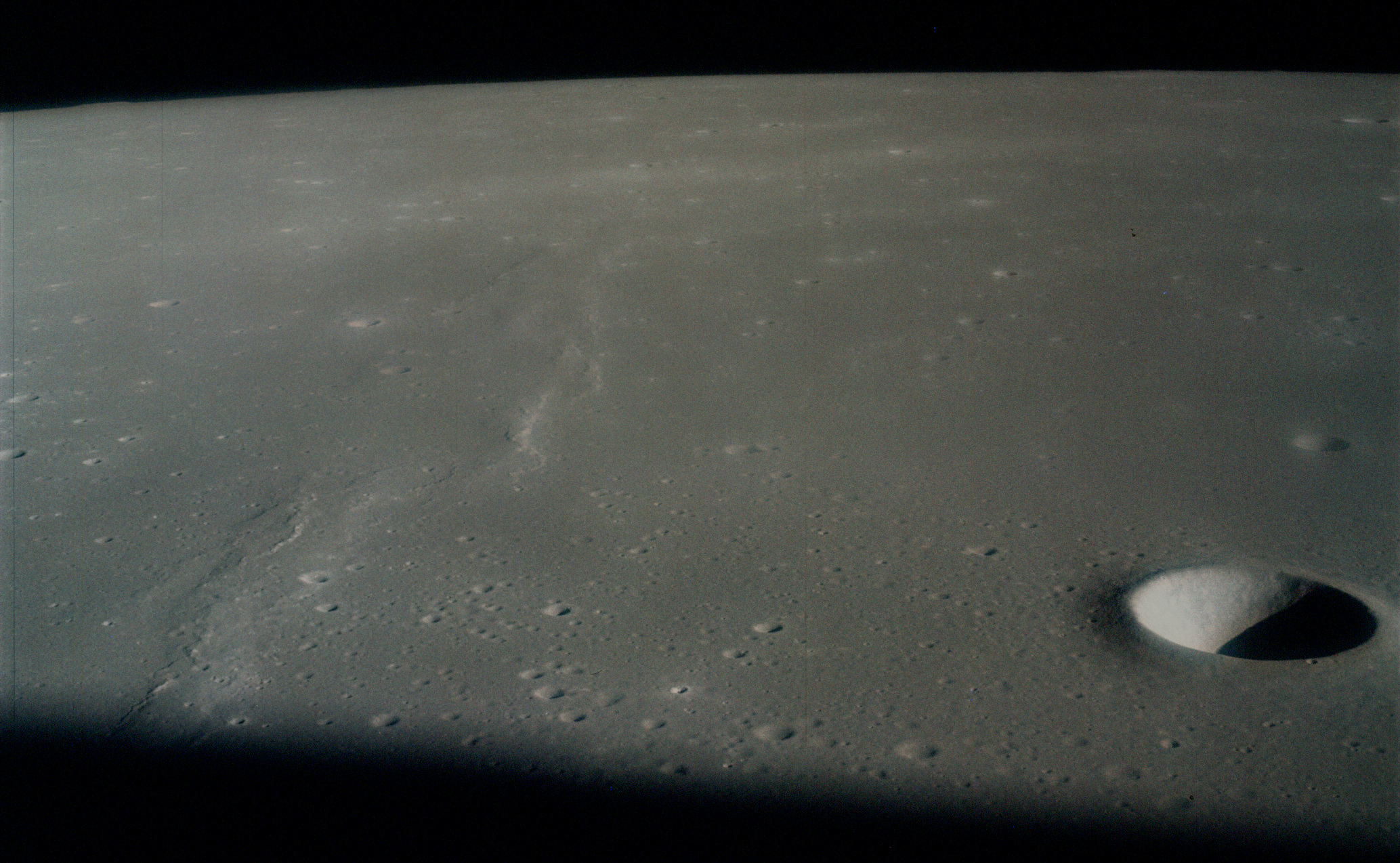
Oblique view also from Apollo 15

Dorsum Azara is a wrinkle ridge at 26.7°N 19.2°E in Mare Serenitatis on the Moon. It is 103 km long and was named after Spanish naturalist Félix de Azara in 1976.
