= Pestalozzianum =

Swiss foundation

- Named after: Johann Heinrich Pestalozzi
- Formation: 1875
- Type: Non-profit organization and teacher education organisation
- Legal status: active
- Headquarters: Zürich
- Region served: Switzerland
- Method: information
- Website: Official website (in German)

Stiftung Pestalozzianum is a foundation based in Zürich named after the Swiss education pioneer Johann Heinrich Pestalozzi. Formerly named Pestalozzianum, between 1875 and 2002 it operated with the objective to promote the school teacher's instruction and postgraduate training. In 2003 it was renamed Stiftung Pestalozzianum, as its education-oriented objectives were integrated in the new model of university-like colleges (Fachhochschule) which were introduced in Switzerland in 2002.

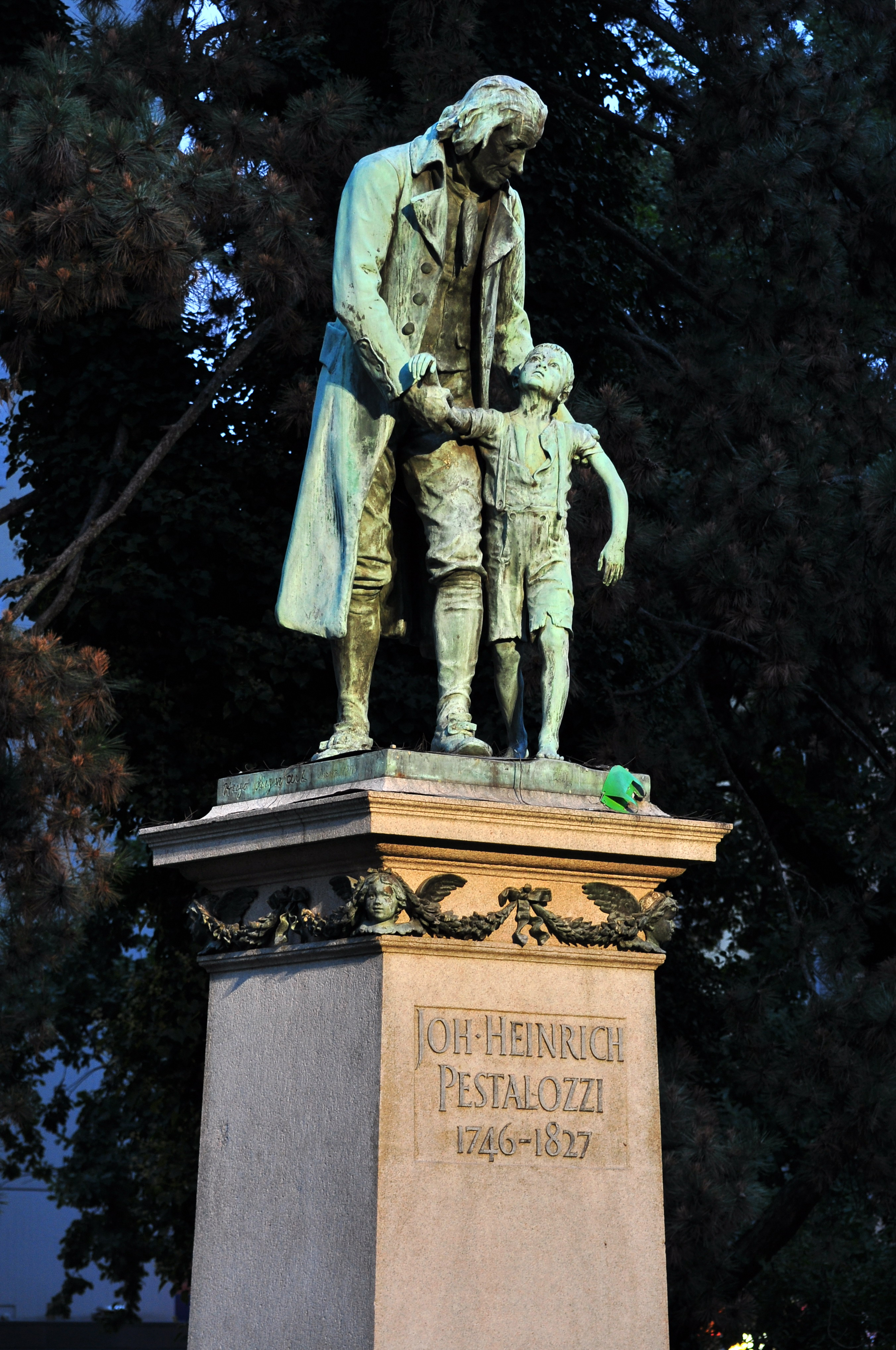
Johann Heinrich Pestalozzi memorial, Pestalozziwiese in Zürich

== History and objectives ==
Pestalozzianum emerged from a decision of the school association of the city of Zürich from 2 February 1875, to establish a Swiss permanent school exhibition with adjacent museum. Enhanced with a specialized library and a reading room, the collection should present the entire teaching aids offered in Switzerland. For the Swiss teachers day 1878 in Zürich, an exhibition about the life and work of Johann Heinrich Pestalozzi was held, which was later set up in the so-called "Pestalozzi-Stübchen" and was constantly expanded with documents. In 1891 the institute has been renamed in Pestalozzianum - Institut zur Förderung des Schul- und Bildungswesens und der Pestalozziforschung in Zürich (literally: Pestalozzianum institute for the promotion of school and education and the Pestalozzi research in Zürich), and in 1902 established as the Pestalozzianum foundation. The Pestalozzianum expanded its school-oriented library and documentation with specific media (slides, school murals) for the purposes of the elementary school, and developed it educational activities and services after 1927, when the foundation moved to the former Beckenhof in Zürich-Unterstrass. From 1955 it influenced the development of the Zürich primary school (German: Zürcher Volksschule) essentially. New labor and specialized agencies extended the advisory services for school tasks in the 1980s and 1990s. As of March 2000 saw the establishment of the Pädagogische Hochschule Zürich PHZH, and from 2002 all previous institutions of teacher education and postgraduate training - including the Pestalozzianum - in the canton of Zürich merged and were integrated into the PHZH university.

== Stiftung Pestalozzianum ==
The foundation established in 2003 focuses on the educational discourse, understanding of education, and the history of education. It claims to support and launch innovative projects that enhance the understanding of education and the educational knowledge in the public. Of particular importance are projects that discuses current educational issues, public education discourse, the formation history, and that are devoted to the heritage of Johann Heinrich Pestalozzi. The foundation also provides a publishing house for education-related content, and also provides its historical collections to the research library (Forschungsbibliothek Pestalozzianum).

== Forschungsbibliothek Pestalozzianum ==
The Pestalozzianum Research Library holds a historically grown collection which focuses on school and educational history. Examples of its stock are sources related to the history of scientific education, the history of pedagogy, school history, education as well as works related to Johann Heinrich Pestalozzi. The extensive collection of historical education literature since the early 18th century includes also "gray literature" such as pamphlets, commemorative speeches and lectures, Swiss school laws since 1832, annual reports of the educational institutions in Switzerland, historical textbooks and magazines, graphic sheets, and a large Pestalozziana (related to Pestalozzi) collection. The library cooperates with domestic and foreign institutions in the field of education and training history. It is open to the public and free of charge.
