= Johann Christoff Büss =

German bookbinder and educator (1776–1855)

Johann Christoff Büss (Buß; 8 August 1776 – 25 September 1855) was a German bookbinder and educator who is best known for his work with Swiss educator Johann Heinrich Pestalozzi. Büss developed a pedagogical method for drawing based on Pestalozzi's ideas.

== Early life ==
Büss was born at Tübingen in Württemberg in 1776 to Johann David Buß and Wilhelmina Rosina Krimmelin. He was born into the working class; his father was employed in a subordinate position at the theological school. His father’s position enabled Büss better opportunities of early instruction than are usually enjoyed by his social class. In the grammar school, he acquired considerable knowledgeable in Greek and Hebrew, logic and rhetoric.

His father applied for Büss to attend the Stuttgart Academy established by Duke Charles, at Stuttgart, but this was refused. At about the same time, an edict was issued, prohibiting children of the middle and lower class from practicing a literary career. Although disappointed, Büss did not despair, but instead applied himself to the study of drawing. At age sixteen he was forced to give up drawing for an apprenticeship as a bookbinder. Not satisfied with this career, Büss traveled to Switzerland looking for a position as a private tutor. His lack of self-confidence made it impossible for him to find pupils and he once again reverted to bookbinding in order to make a living. It was at this point that he became acquainted with two of Pestalozzi’s assistants, Johan Georg Tobler and Krusi, and learned that Pestalozzi was looking for a teacher of drawing and music for his school at Burgdorf, Switzerland. Büss took this opportunity as a chance to advance his own education as well as to contribute to the work of the school, despite warnings from others:

“I was, as I have before stated, fully aware of my deficiencies; and the hope that I should meet with an opportunity of improving myself, had no small share in my determination to go to Burgdorf, in spite of the warnings which I received from several quarters against forming any connection with Pestalozzi, who, they told me, was half mad, and knew not himself what he was about.”

In 1800, he married Susanna Barbara Maria Margaretha Brenner in Mannheim.

== Burgdorf ==
Büss joined Pestalozzi's staff at Burgdorf in 1800. Upon being interviewed by Pestalozzi, Büss was taken aback by his disheveled appearance and the way his school was run. The next morning Büss observed a class and described it as ‘apparent disorder’ and ‘uncomfortable bustle’. Upon observing Pestalozzi’s method based on spiral learning, he realized the advantages:

“At first I thought the children were detained too long at one point; but I was soon reconciled to this, when I saw the perfection which they attained in their first exercises, and the advantages which it insured to them in their further progress.”

Pestalozzi gave Büss the task of developing a method based on spiral learning to teach drawing. Büss struggled to understand Pestalozzi’s ideas that lines, angles and curves were the basis of all drawing. After several months of experimentation, Büss realized the required teaching method and wrote ABC der Anschauung in a few days. Upon the completion of ABC der Anschauung, Büss’ whole perceptual process was transformed:

“Whatever my eyes glanced upon from that moment, I saw between lines which determined its outline. Now I perceived the outline invariably as distinct from the object, as a measurable form, the slightest deviation from which I could easily ascertain. Before I had seen nothing but objects; now I saw nothing but lines…”

== Büss, writings ==
ABC der Anschauung, 1803. ABC der Anschauung (ABC of sense-impressions) was prepared by Büss as a realization of the Pestalozzian method applied to drawing, and only its preface is by Pestalozzi himself, although he is known to have approved of Büss’ interpretation of his pedagogical method.

Each lesson was designed to follow a predetermined structure in which the teacher demonstrated and named the figure to be learned, followed by a question and answer session about its form. The lesson was ended with the children drawing the figure for themselves.

’In this exercise one gets the teacher to draw freehand simple horizontal lines, without regard to their determined length, but with attention to their straight direction.
The teacher draws his line and says to the children:

I draw a horizontal line.

The children all do the same and say together:

I draw a horizontal line.

The teacher: Have you done it?
The children answer: Yes!
Teacher: What have you done?
Children: I have drawn a horizontal line.
The teacher continues and says:

I draw underneath this line a second horizontal line, which is longer than the first.

The children repeat the same.
Etc.’

The teaching method used in ABC der Anschauung served as a model for numerous subsequent methods in drawing as well as the teaching of any subject at the elementary level.

== See also ==
- Johann Heinrich Pestalozzi

== Sources ==
- Ashwin, Clive. “Pestalozzi and the Origins of Pedagogical Drawing”. British Journal of Educational Studies, 1981
- Barnard, Henry. “Johannes Büss” American Journal of Education, 1859
- Büss, Johann. “ABC der Anschauung”. Zürich und Bern, 1803
