= Félix de Azara =

Spanish military officer and naturalist (1746–1821)

Félix de Azara y Perera
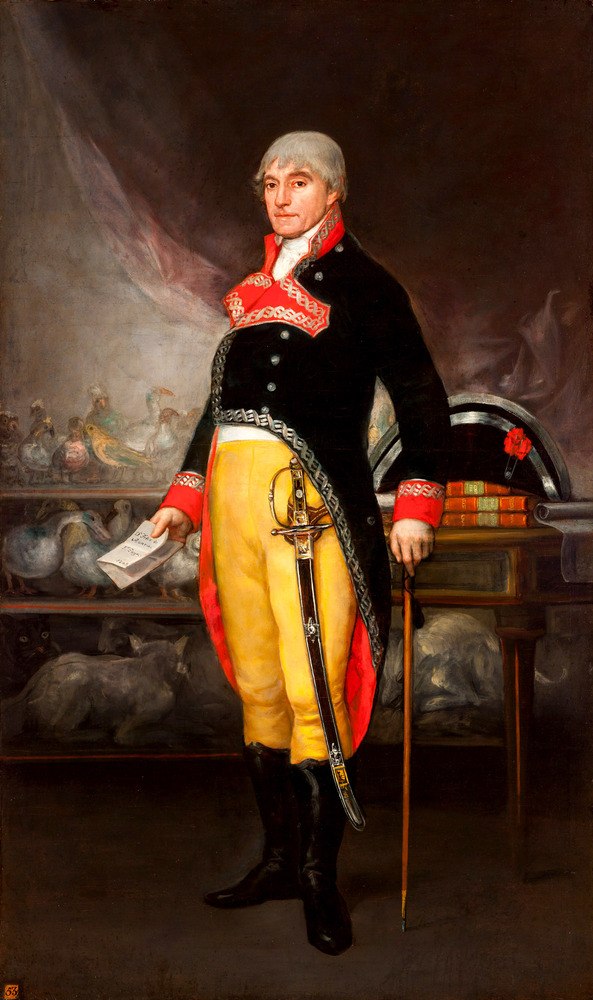
- Portrait by Francisco Goya, 1804
- Born: 18 May 1742; Barbuñales, Spain
- Died: 20 October 1821 (aged 79); Barbuñales, Spain
- Occupations: Soldier, geographer, engineer
- Known for: Description of many birds
- Scientific career
- Author abbrev. (botany): Azara
- Author abbrev. (zoology): Azara, Az.

Félix de Azara y Perera (18 May 1742 – 20 October 1821) was a Spanish military officer, naturalist, and engineer.

== Life ==
Félix de Azara y Perera was born on 18 May 1746 in Barbuñales, Aragon. He joined the army and attended a Spanish military academy. He was commissioned as an engineer, distinguishing himself on various expeditions. He spent the next thirteen years of his life in the military and rose to the rank of brigadier general in the Spanish Army.

In 1777, Spain and Portugal signed the Treaty of San Ildefonso. As dictated by the treaty, each nation would send a delegation to the Río de la Plata region to negotiate the border dispute between the Portuguese and Spanish colonies. Azara was selected as a member of this delegation, departing quickly for the New World. The Portuguese delegation, however, never arrived, and Azara ended up remaining in the region from 1781 to 1801. To pass the time, he decided to create an accurate map of the region. On these expeditions, Azara began observing the nature of the region. Over the course of his time there, he "described 448 birds...This number is reduced to 381 when duplications of sex, age, and plumage are taken into account (eight remain unidentified), and 178 of them are the types upon which the scientific names are based.” He also identified 78 quadrupeds, 43 of which were new. A number of animals were named after him, including Azara's night monkey (Aotus azarae), Azara's agouti (Dasyprocta azarae), Azara's grass mouse (Akodon azarae), Azara's spinetail (Synallaxis azarae), and Azara's tree iguana (Liolaemus azarai). Dorsum Azara on the Moon is also named after him. Before leaving South America, he sent his brother José Nicolás de Azara (then Spanish Ambassador at Paris) his zoological notes and observations, which Médéric Louis Élie Moreau de Saint-Méry published at Paris in 1801 under the title of Essai sur l'histoire naturelle des quadrupèdes du Paraguay. In 1802 there appeared at Madrid the essay Apuntamientos para la Historia natural de los cuadrúpedos del Paraguay y Río de la Plata.

Upon his return to Europe in 1801, he traveled to Paris to meet his brother. There, he published Voyage dans l'Amerique meridionale depuis 1781 jusqu'en 1801 (1809), which included his observations on many topics ranging from the geography of the region to characteristics of the many indigenous groups in the region. Following the death of his brother, Azara returned to Spain and held a variety of minor government positions. He died of pneumonia on 20 October 1821 and was buried in his family's vault in the town of his birth.

== His works ==
His works were well received, though not without criticism. Azara had largely written his works to correct what he considered to be many errors in Histoire naturelle by Georges-Louis Leclerc, Comte de Buffon. Intellectuals praised him for his thoroughness and accuracy. Charles Darwin had a high regard for Azara's work (despite the latter not being a professional naturalist), and in several of his books spoke approvingly of Azara's authority, citing his works on meteorology, insects, birds and archeology of the River Plate basin. Darwin also owned a translation of Azara's Essai sur L'Histoire Naturelle de Quadruped du Paraguay.
