= José Nicolás de Azara =

Spanish diplomat (1730–1804)

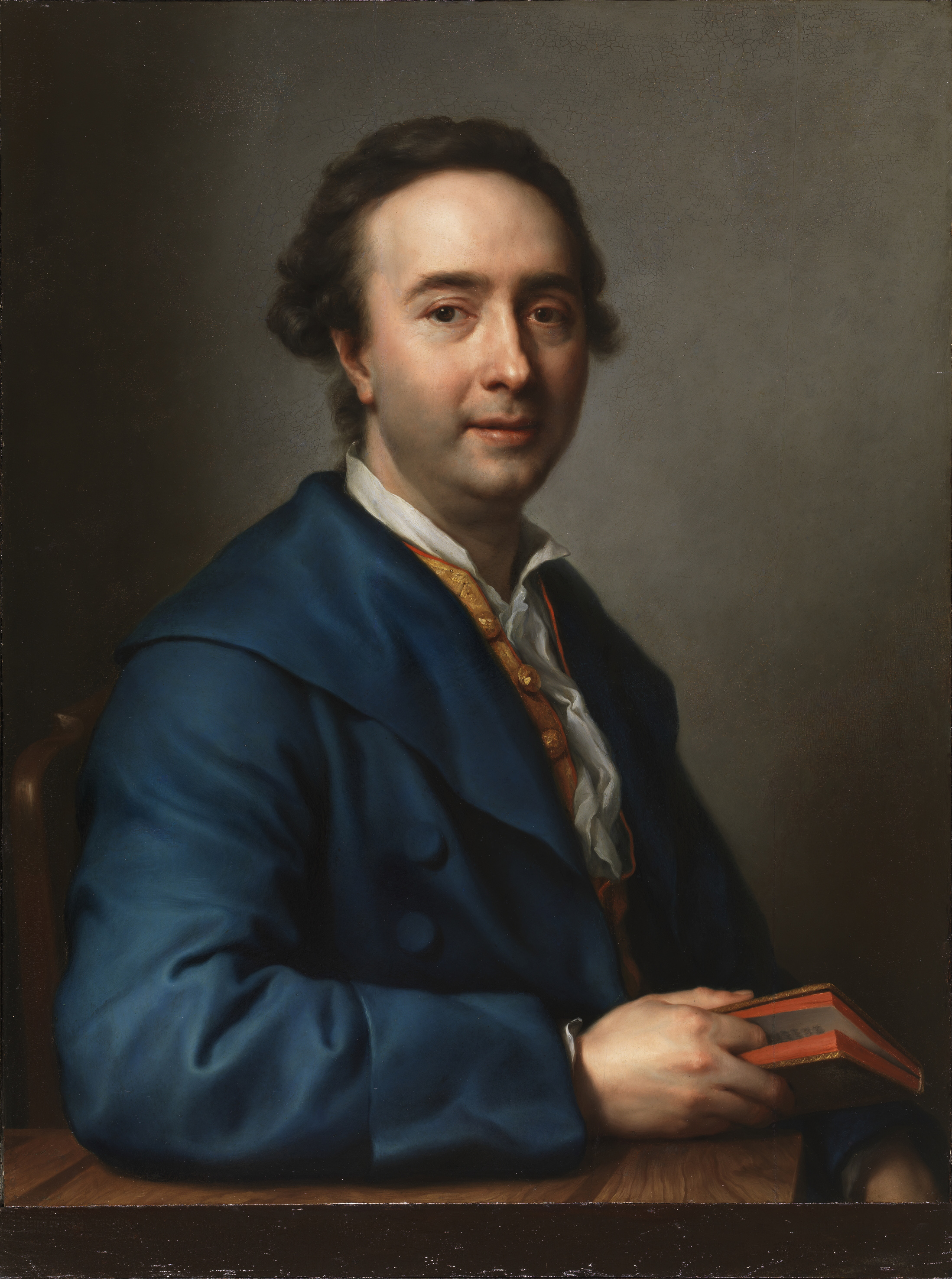
Portrait of José Nicolás de Azara (Anton Raphael Mengs)

Don José Nicolás de Azara y Perera (5 December 1730 – 26 January 1804) was a Spanish diplomat.

== Life ==
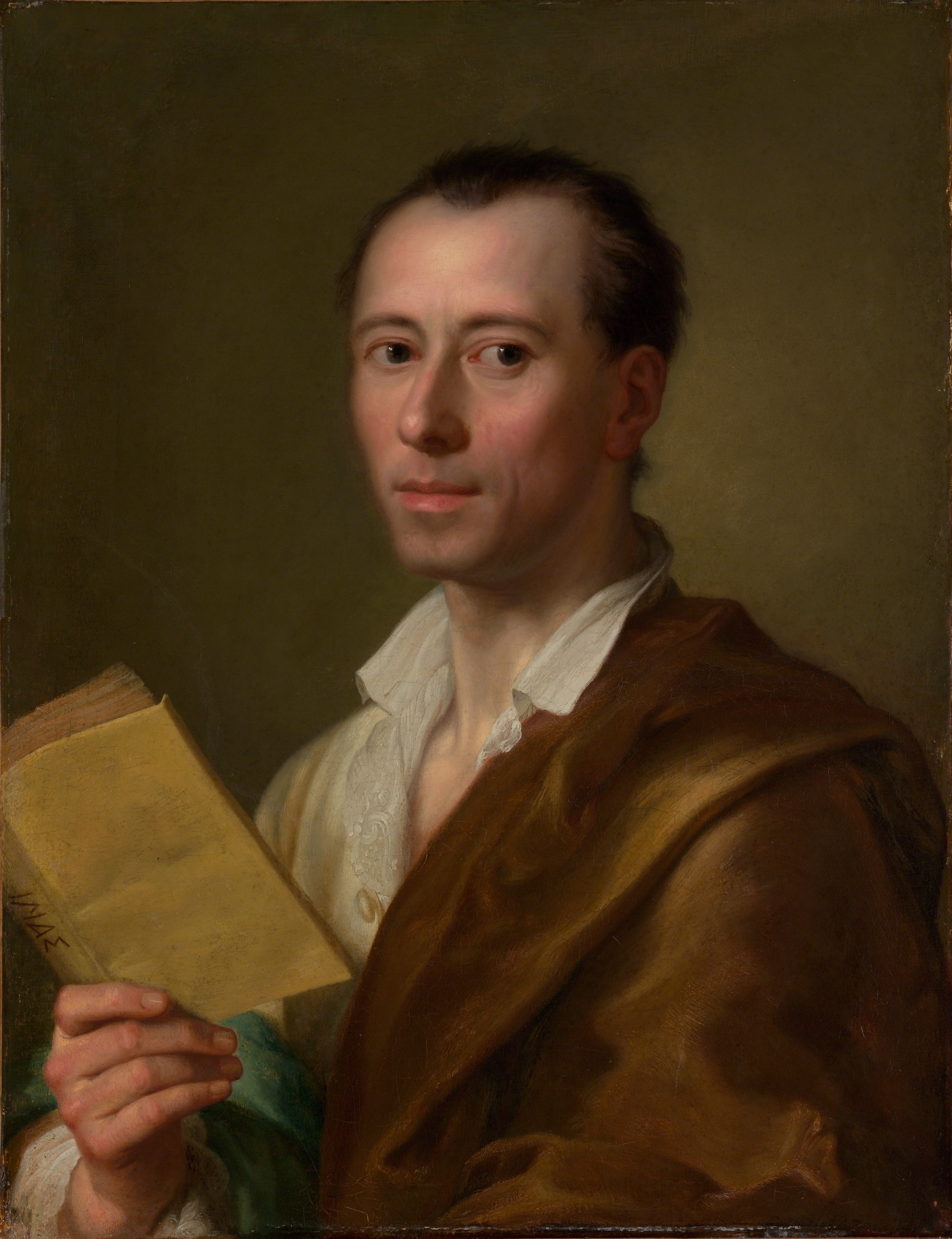
Portrait of Johann Joachim Winckelmann, by Mengs

He was born in a noble family in Barbunales, Aragon. He studied at the University of Salamanca, and resided in Salamanca for just over ten years, where worked as a librarian after his studies. An official in the Ministry of Foreign Affairs since 1760, he was sent to Rome in 1765. He would be at the Roman embassy for 33 years, first as General Agent of Prayers (Agente de Preces) to Rome and from 1785 to 1798 as Spanish Ambassador to the Holy See.

During his long residence there, he distinguished himself as a collector of Italian antiquities and as a patron of art. He was a follower of Johann Joachim Winckelmann and bought the posthumous portrait painted as a memorial to him by Mengs. Some of the items in his collection came from excavations he conducted near Rome.

He was also an able and active diplomat, took a lead part in the difficult and hazardous task of the expulsion of the Jesuits from Spain, and was instrumental in securing the election of Pope Pius VI. Azara was the Pope's representative during the negotiations with France for the Armistice of Bologna. He withdrew to Florence when the French took possession of Rome in 1798, but acted on behalf of the pope during his exile and after his death at Valence in 1799.

He was afterwards Spanish ambassador in Paris. In that post it was his misfortune to be forced by his government to conduct the negotiations which led to the Treaty of San Ildefonso, by which Spain was wholly subjected to Napoleon. Azara was friendly to a French alliance, but his experience showed him that his country was being sacrificed to Napoleon. The First Consul liked him personally, and found him easy to influence. Azara died, worn out, in Paris in 1804. His end was undoubtedly embittered by his discovery of the ills which the French alliance must produce for Spain.

Several sympathetic notices of Azara will be found in Thiers, Consulat et Empire. See also Reinado de Carles IV, by Gen. José Gómez de Arteche, in the Historia General de España, published by the Royal Academy of History, Madrid, 1892, &c. There is a Notice historique sur le Chevalier d'Azara by his friend Bourgoing (1804).

His younger brother Félix de Azara (1746–1821) was a noted naturalist in South America.

== Bibliography ==
- Azara, José Nicolás de (1847). Revoluciones de Roma: que causaron la destitucion del papa Pio VI como soberano temporal, y el establecimiento de la última república romana, asi como la conquista de aquella parte de Italia por los Franceses mandados por Napoleon; y relacion de la política de España y de los sucesos de Francia posteriores á estos acontecimientos (in Spanish). Madrid: Imprenta de Sanchiz.
- Castellanos de Losada, Basilio Sebastian (1849). Historia de la vida de D. José Nicolás de Azara (in Spanish). Vol. Tomo I. Madrid: Baltasar González. Tomo II. 1850.
- Corona Baratech, Carlos E. (1948). José Nicolás de Azara, un embajador español en Roma (in Spanish). Zaragoza: Institución "Fernando el Católico" (C.S.I.C.) de la Excma. Diputación Provincial.

Attribution
