= Pestalozzi-Stiftung Hamburg =

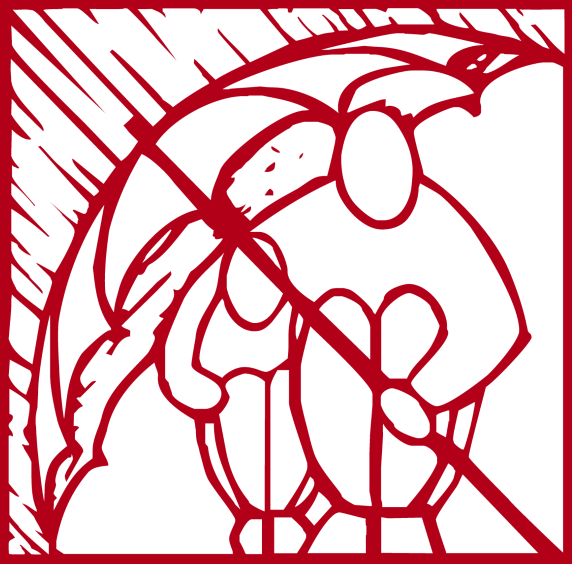
The Pestalozzi-Stiftung Hamburg in Hamburg (Germany) provides people support and the help to self-help

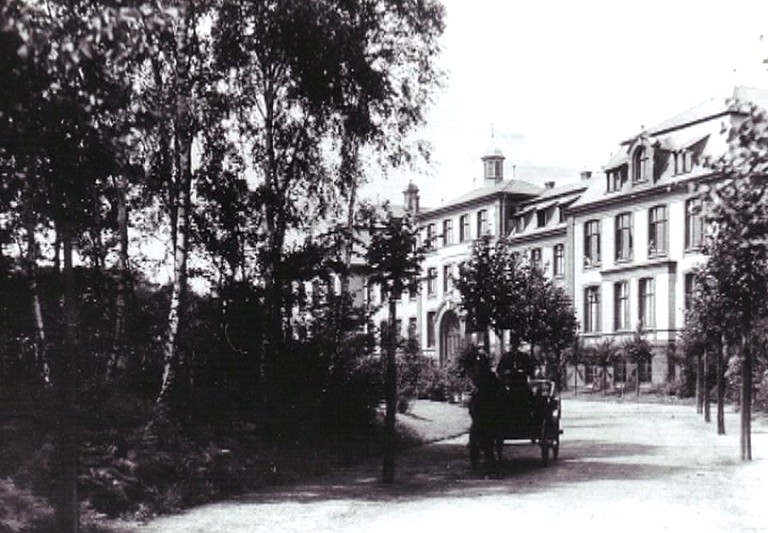
Children´s foster home of the Pestalozzi-Stiftung Hamburg in Volksdorf (Hamburg, Germany) in 1906

The Pestalozzi-Stiftung Hamburg ("Pestalozzi foundation Hamburg") is a social and charitable organization founded in 1847 in Hamburg, German Confederation. Over a period of more than hundred years, the organisation ran a children's foster home which changed its location several times within Hamburg. Constant adjustments have taken place over the last decades. Recently, the organisation has maintained facilities and projects in many parts of Hamburg and to a lesser extent in Lower Saxony (Niedersachsen) and Schleswig-Holstein. Its main goal is to provide support and counselling for children, youths and families. It also maintains day care facilities for children and facilities for adults with disabilities and mental illnesses. The organisation's work depends to a large extent on public funds and owns only a limited amount of capital assets which are not used for funding external projects. The Pestalozzi-Stiftung Hamburg appeals to the convictions of Johann Heinrich Pestalozzi whose aim in education was "to strengthen the human being" and to move him to a point where he is "able to help himself". The organisation is based on the idea of offering people the means to attain the ability of "help to self-help".

== History ==
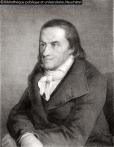
Johann-Heinrich Pestalozzi (12 January 1746 - 17 February 1827).

The Pestalozzi-Stiftung Hamburg was founded on 12 January 1846. The idea to establish a charity foundation was born during the celebration of the 100 years commemoration in honour of Johann Heinrich Pestalozzi. The charity was initiated by the Masonic' lodge "Zur Brudertreue". The intention was to provide support for orphan children whose parents lead a destructive or abusive lifestyle and in situations which show a degradation and hazard of the children's moral and physical state. The idea was to take the children out of their family and raise them as free-thinking human beings in an enlightened spirit based on Pestalozzi's ideas and methods. The charity created an aid organization in the form of a children's foster home which would take in neglected children when families could not care for them anymore.

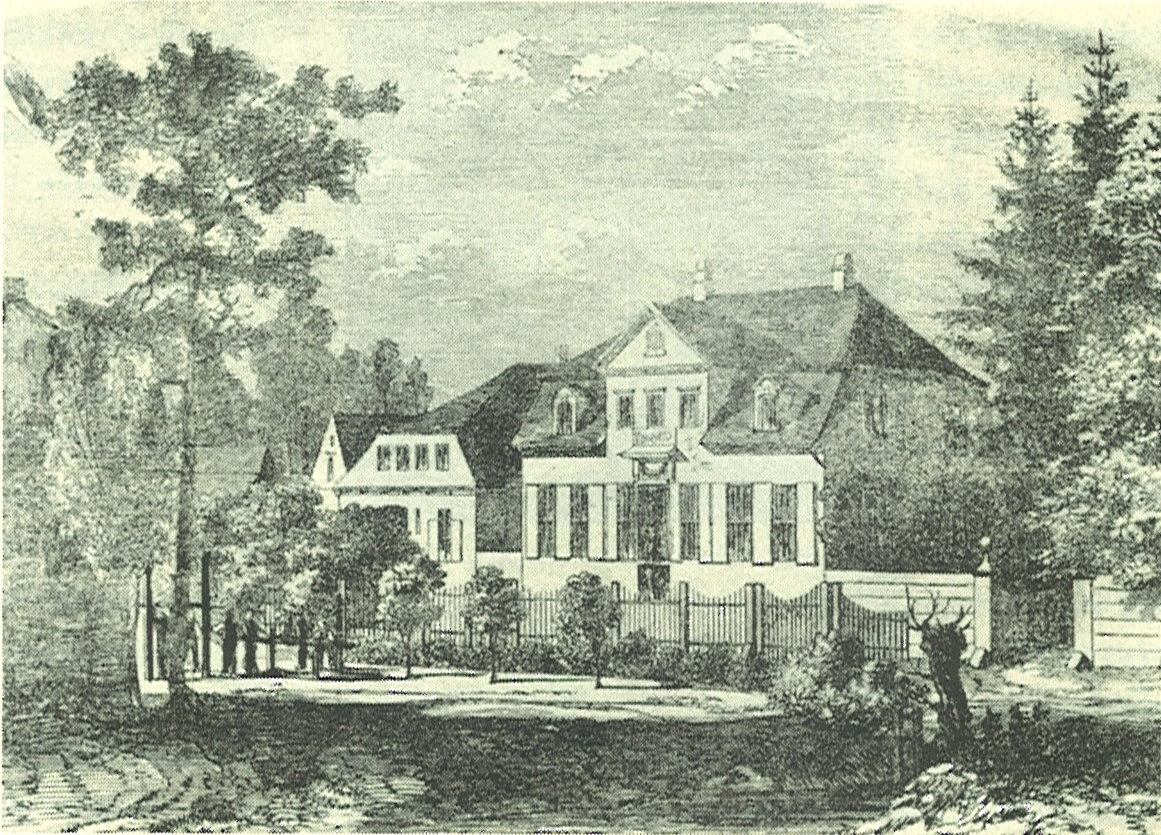
The Pestalozzi children´s foster home in "Billwärder" in Hamburg around 1850.

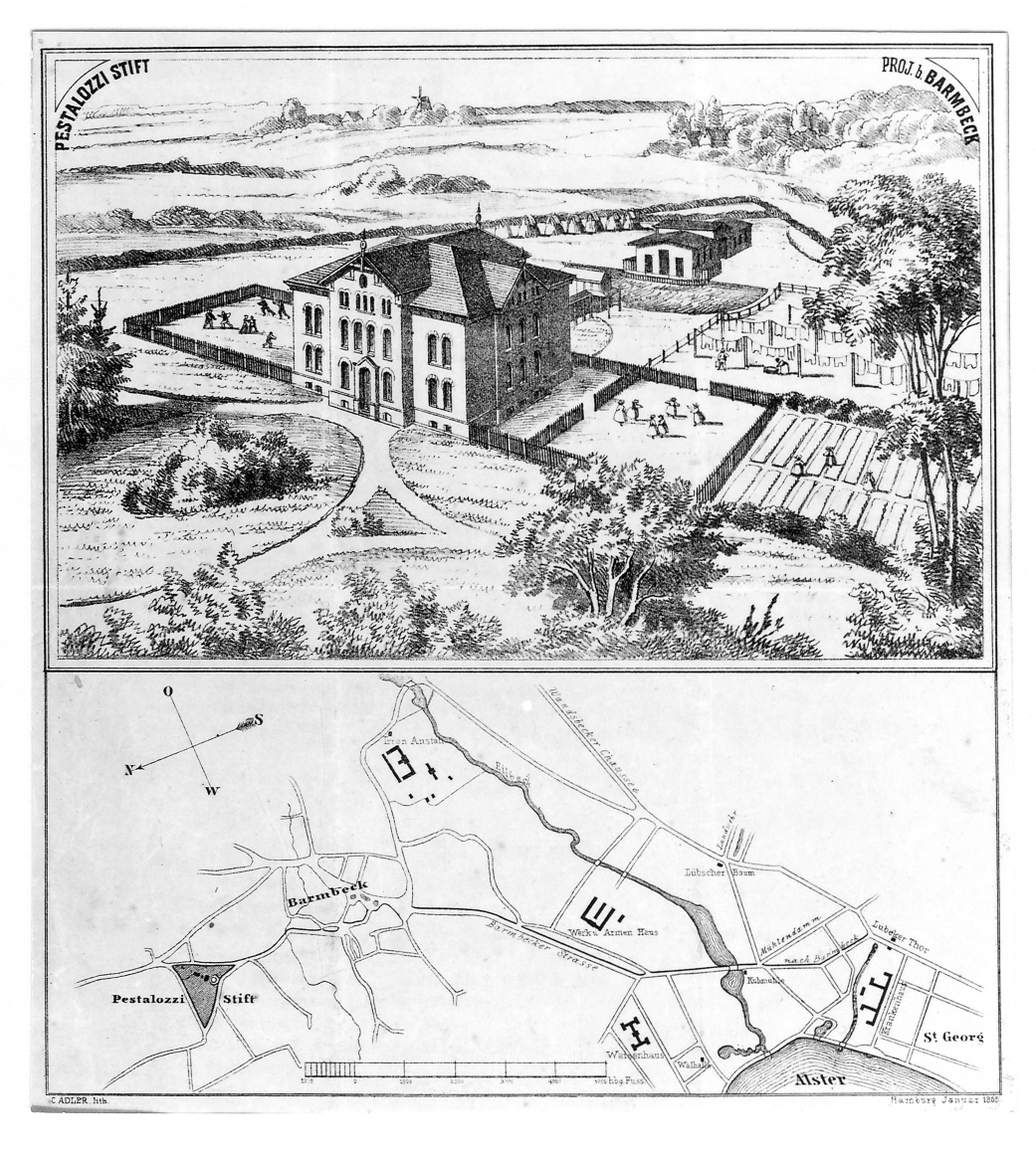
The"Pestalozzi-Stift" and the district "Barmbeck" in Hamburg in 1865

The first children's home was established on 8 August 1847 in Hamburg, in the district Billwerder and became a shelter for 32 children. In 1865 the foundation was laid for a new and bigger facility in the district Barmbeck (now Barmbek) on the Hufnerstraße. The number of places for children rose to 78. Due to the urban development of Hamburg, especially the construction of Barmbek station as well as the necessity for more space within the home, the children's home had to move to another location again. The new children's home which could take in 100 children was inaugurated on 29 August 1906, in the district Volksdorf. In 1930, the Pestalozzi-Stiftung Hamburg had to move another time to the district Ohlstedt, where a part of the facilities has been used as a residential home until today.

During World War II, the director of the children's foster home, Elisabeth Schleuß and the chairman Hugo Poppe behaved restrained towards the prevailing political convictions, and that was noticeable in terms of the children's education. The attitude was reflected in the fact that there was no portraits of Hitler in the whole house. Furthermore, ideological ideas or songs which glorified the national consciousness or the fighting spirit of the army were not spread at any time in the children's home. In 1943 the imperial governor (Nazi Gauleiter) Karl Kaufmann arranged a confiscation of the main building so that the children's hospital of Rothenburgsort, which had been bombed and destroyed could be moved into the building of the children's foster home and the Pestalozzi children had to move out of their house. The children's home was saved from closing and could continue its work only under considerable restrictions with twenty out of forty children who were housed in the cramped accommodations of the adjoining building.

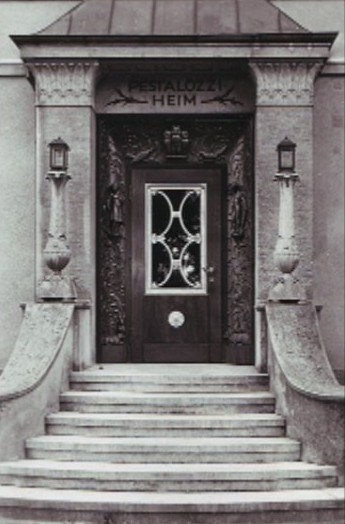
Today at Diestelstraße, there is a residential home, formerly a children's foster home.

After the war, in 1947, the Pestalozzi-Stiftung Hamburg received its property back and could again accommodate 40 children. Yet due to the monetary reform in 1948, the assets had become valueless, and the biggest part of the real estate had to be sold little by little for the maintenance of operation. Moreover, the following years were marked by financial and structural difficulties. Throughout the years, the charity has been changing its shape, and it has broadened its range of facilities in the field of child, youth and family services, as well as the care for people with handicaps.

Over the years the concepts and practical offers have been developed due to historical and social changes and adjusted to the newly arising circumstances. Today the headquarters is settled in Hamburg, in the district St. Georg. The classical idea of a home for children has been converted into various regional facilities for children, youths, families and people with handicaps. The facilities are spread throughout the city of Hamburg, as well as the states of Schleswig-Holstein and Lower Saxony.

== Philosophy ==
=== "Learning to live - is the aim of our education" ===
The philosophy of the Pestalozzi-Stiftung Hamburg is based on the values and insights of its eponym, Johann Heinrich Pestalozzi. The charity aims to support people in difficult circumstances providing help in their daily life tasks. The basic idea of the charity work is to provide people "the help to self-help". In education and upbringing the idea is that youths should not be forced into a preset mould, rather the initial development of the original vigour should be supported and facilitated. The essence of the charity's work is described very well in the following quotation by Pestalozzi: "Only through one´s heart can the heart of another human being be lead and the love of one´s heart is revealed through care and considerate deeds." The daily charity work rests upon the fundamentals of appreciation, empathy, benevolence, solidarity and self-determination.

=== "Through one's heart can the heart of another human being be led." ===
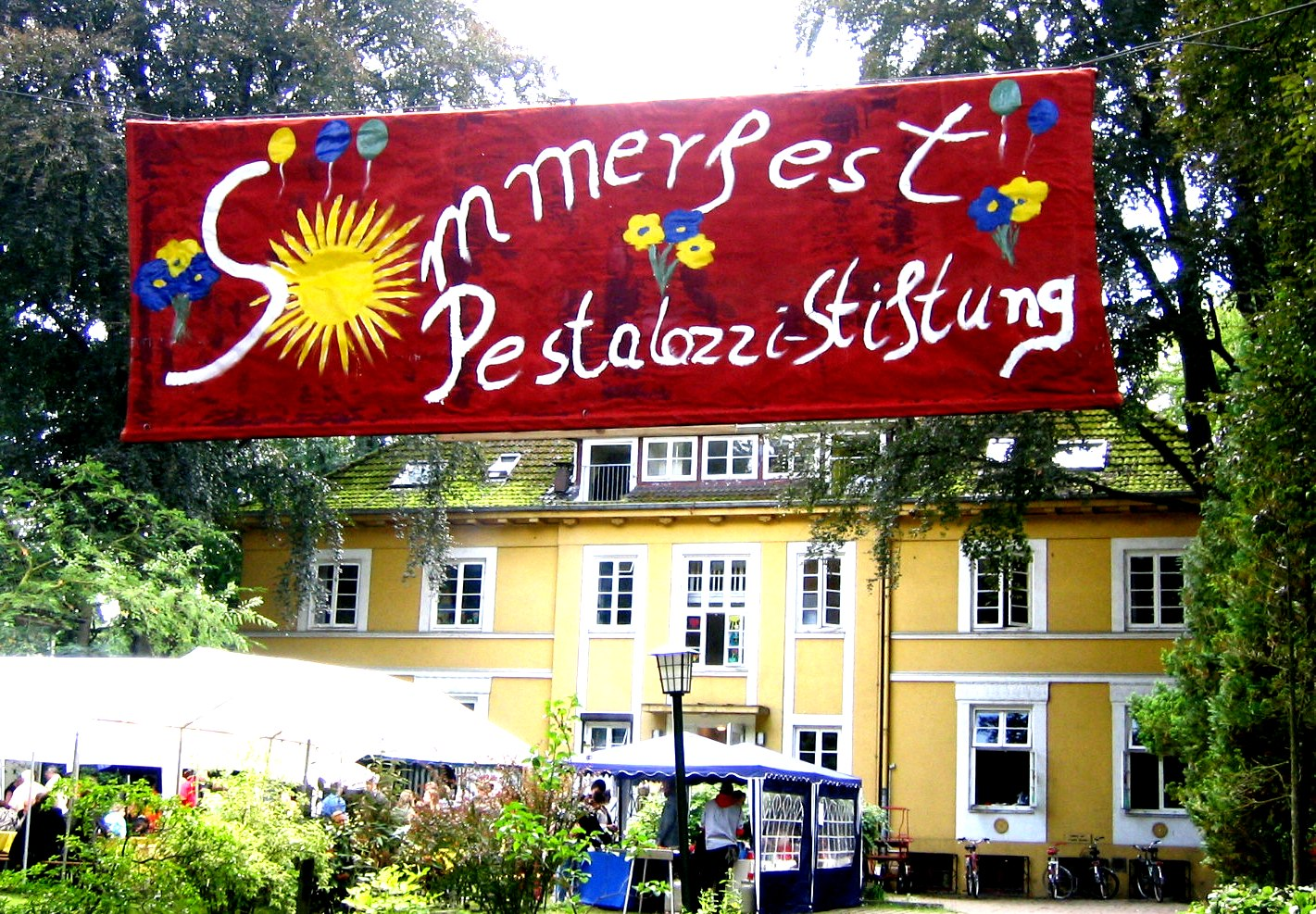
Summerfeast of the "Pestalozzi-Stiftung Hamburg" in the Diestelstraße

Employees of the Pestalozzi-Stiftung Hamburg act according to the principles of Johann Heinrich Pestalozzi. His motivation was based on his own experience of a childhood spent in poverty and deprivation. Johann Heinrich Pestalozzi grew up in difficult circumstances and was striving his whole life to educate poor and underprivileged children and teach them moral values and autonomy in daily life. According to this principle, the Pestalozzi-Stiftung is providing children, youths, families and people with handicaps with various options of support in different areas of life. The people who are supported learn to solve conflicts and everyday problems, to open up new vistas, to turn their ideas into reality, as well as to cut self-confidentially and successfully their own paths. The charity emphasises that it is a central goal to support and nurture the development of each individual according to their own talents, strengths and interests, and to build social networks within the society.

== Facilities by the Pestalozzi-Stiftung Hamburg ==
=== With "a head, a heart and a hand" ===
The Pestalozzi-Stiftung Hamburg has provided a wide range of services for children, youths, families and people with handicaps in Hamburg, Schleswig-Holstein and Lower Saxony (Niedersachsen). The charity runs day care centres, residential houses, residential long-term communities, ambulant and stationary consultation and assistance as well as common wealth work. The charity work aims to enable people through intellect, kindness and humanity to perform autonomous decisions and actions in daily life.

=== Child day care centres ===
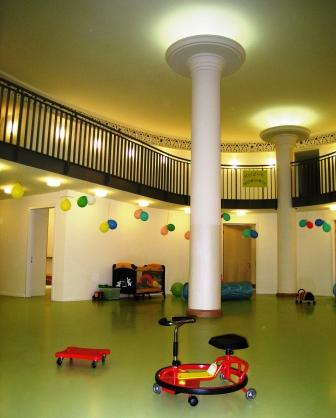
Pestalozzi-Stiftung Hamburg day care centre in Bethesdastraße street, in Hamburg.

The Pestalozzi-Stiftung Hamburg runs various day care centres for children between the ages of 0 and 14. Additionally, there are accommodations for school children called "Pedagogical lunch tables"; children can come after school and eat a hot lunch, get adequate care and support with their homework and spend their free time. Currently there are four child day care centres within the Hamburg city limits: in Eißendorf, Borgfelde, Eppendorf (on the campus of the Charity-foundation "Anscharhöhe") and in St. Pauli, situated within the Millerntor-Stadion on the Heiligengeistfeld. The latter day care centre is a cooperation project between the association football club FC St. Pauli and the Pestalozzi-Stiftung Hamburg and is claimed to be the first child day care centre worldwide to be located in a soccer stadium.

=== Help for youths ===
==== Residential houses ====
The Pestalozzi-Stiftung Hamburg offers children and youths who cannot live any longer with their families a chance to stay temporarily in residential houses in the districts Altona-Nord and Farmsen. Various problems and difficult family histories require the youths to be placed in these facilities. Their goal is to provide the children and youths with an atmosphere of warmth and security, and to strengthen their sense of self-confidence and responsibility in day-to-day life. In a constant dialogue between these young people, their families and the pedagogical supervisors, the individual solutions are developed and realized. The main focus is to enable a successful coping with problems and conflicts and the integration within a social network. The children and youths should return into their families afterwards.

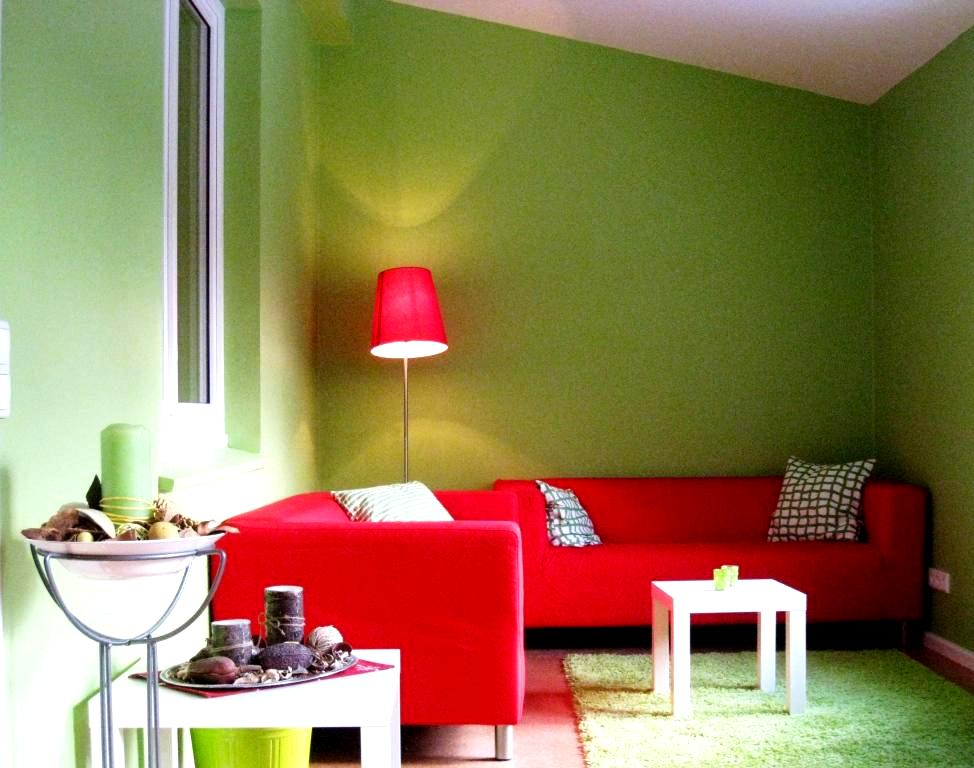
Living room in the residential house in Hamburg-Altona for children and youth

==== Residential long-term communities ====
These social-pedagogical facilities provide a temporary new home for children and youths who come from dysfunctional families and have experienced violence, abuse or neglect. Through a family-like environment, professional social workers create a secure and protective atmosphere and place which allows the youths to develop a sense of trust and lead a life according to their interests and age. Through a close and caring relationship, it is possible to provide individual support and social integration for every child and youth within the group. According to the personal situation of the youth and considering the child's wellbeing, it is always possible to return home to their family. The residential long-term communities are set in Hamburg, Schleswig-Holstein and Lower-Saxony (Niedersachsen).

== Ambulant consultation centres ==
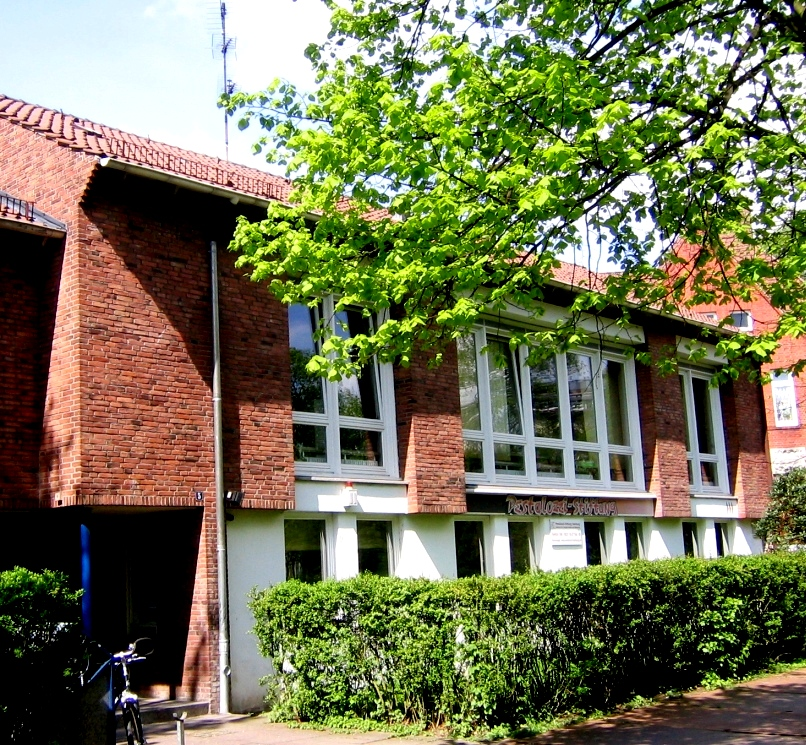
Centre for social work and consultation located in Hamburg, Altona-Nord

The Pestalozzi-Stiftung Hamburg offers social-pedagogical help in child-raising to families who live in dysfunctional and difficult circumstances and which are sent by the youth welfare office. Parents and their children or youth get assistance in managing everyday-life and upcoming problems. Furthermore, the charity offers people with need for assistance (disabled people or people with mental disorders) individual case support. During the consultation the clients receive information about different ways in terms of searching for an apartment or work place, how to back up the financial basis and to ensure adequate health care. Further the centres provide support during the time of separation processes and in dealing with mental sicknesses, as well as accompanying people with handicaps in daily life issues. The consultation of families and individual cases includes the support in finding suitable free time offers for socialising and integration. The ambulant centres for family support and for individual clients support are located in Hamburg in the districts Altona, Berne, Borgfelde and Langenhorn.

=== Support for people with handicaps ===
The Pestalozzi-Stiftung Hamburg offers people with handicaps support in day-to-day life in form of residential communities. Furthermore, there is ambulant consultation and support, single-apartments and regional bureaus spread throughout the whole city where people can receive professional consultancy. For example, in the historical house in the Diestelstraße in the district Ohlstedt, Hamburg women and men of different ages with mental handicaps live together and get support in daily life. The single-apartments in Farmsen and Berne provide accommodation for people with mental disorders, who get specific help solving problems. The goal is providing the clients the possibility to lead an independent, multifaceted social life. Therefore, the clients of the Pestalozzi-Stiftung lead an autonomous life integrated into society.

=== Common wealth work ===
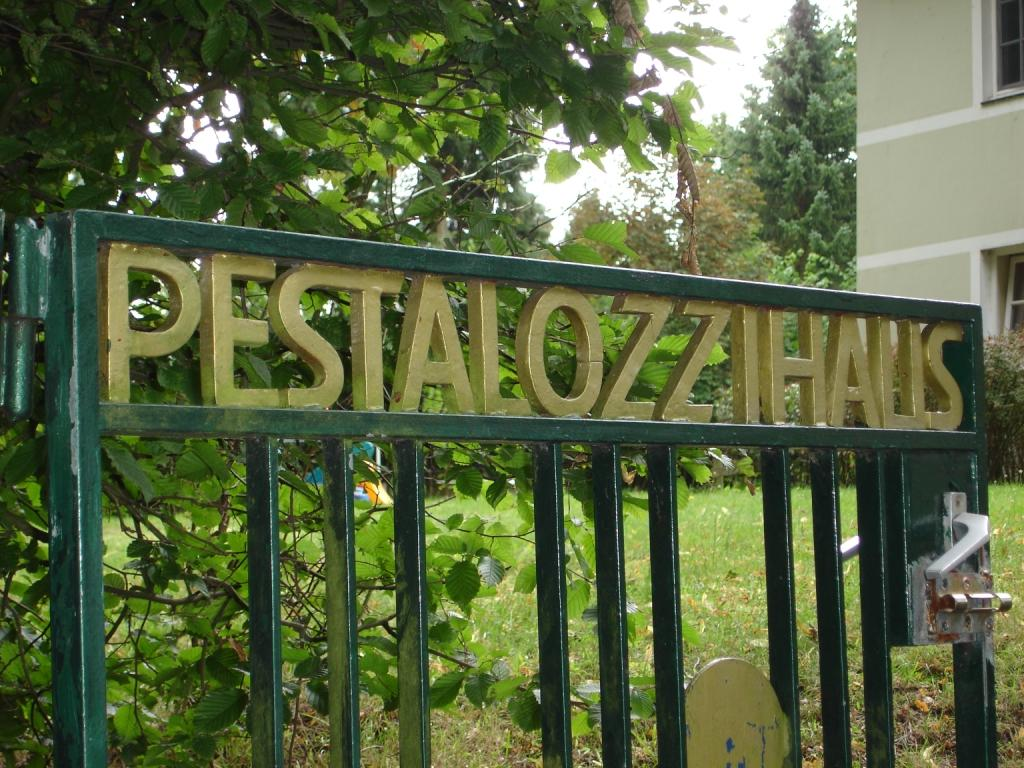
The residential house in the Diestelstraße, Hamburg-Ohlstedt was set up in 1931 as a children's foster home. Today it is a residential house for people with need for assistance.

The Pestalozzi-Stiftung Hamburg provides a range of facilities in Hamburg, which aim to ensure social integration and professional consultation for families, children, youths and young adults.

"Treff Berne" is a regional advisory centre located at the railway station Berne in the former building of the Berne library. The interlinking network with other facilities in this region is essential to perform successful support to the people in this part of town. In the same building a cafe is located so that people from the surroundings can meet and eat lunch for a reasonable price. The Pestalozzi-Stiftung co-operates with the Hamburger Werkstatt GmbH which runs the "Treff Berne" cafe and offers people apprenticeship opportunities.

The "family midwife's projects" in the part of town of Berne and Großlohe support pregnant women and mothers who have psychological, financial and social problems or are under age. The project "Nest pilots" has the same goal and is located in Bergedorf-West, Hamburg. "Nest pilot" (in German "Nestlotse" means to guide young birds in their nest or in this case to guide children) and provides mothers and fathers consultation and practical help before and after the birth of their child up to the sixth year. The cooperation with different organisations plays an important in the daily work as it enables the facilities to provide the optimum care and consultancy in the particular districts.

In the Hamburg district Farmsen, there is a youth centre where children and youngsters from the age of 8 to 18 years meet regularly and practise break dancing, skateboarding, table football, billiards, or Wii games. Even computer courses, cooking evenings and film presentations are provided to the youth in Farmsen.

The family activation teams "F.aktiv" in Berne, Bergedorf-West and Langenhorn aim to offer children, youngsters and families short-term support and consultation primarily concerning psychosociological problems. The work encloses conflict consultation and practical help in everyday situations.

== Finances ==
The Pestalozzi-Stiftung Hamburg finances its facilities for people mainly through public funding by the city of Hamburg. The projects as well are paid to a large amount through subsidies from the city of Hamburg. Especially in terms of establishing new projects, the charity is dependent on donations and private grants.

== Literature ==
- Helmuth Haack: Pestalozzis Kosmos (The Pestalozzi cosmos), Frankfurter Literaturverlag, Frankfurt/Main 2006, ISBN 3-86548-172-8
- Karlheinz Reher: Geschichten aus dem Heim (Stories from the children's home), Privatdruck Karlheinz Reher in Broschürenform
- Madeleine B. Göhring: Die Pestalozzi-Stiftung (1847-1924) Ein Beitrag zur Geschichte der privaten Jugendfürsorge in Hamburg, Hamburg 1994, Magisterarbeit Universität Hamburg
