= Barbuñales =

Barbuñales, Spain Barbunyals
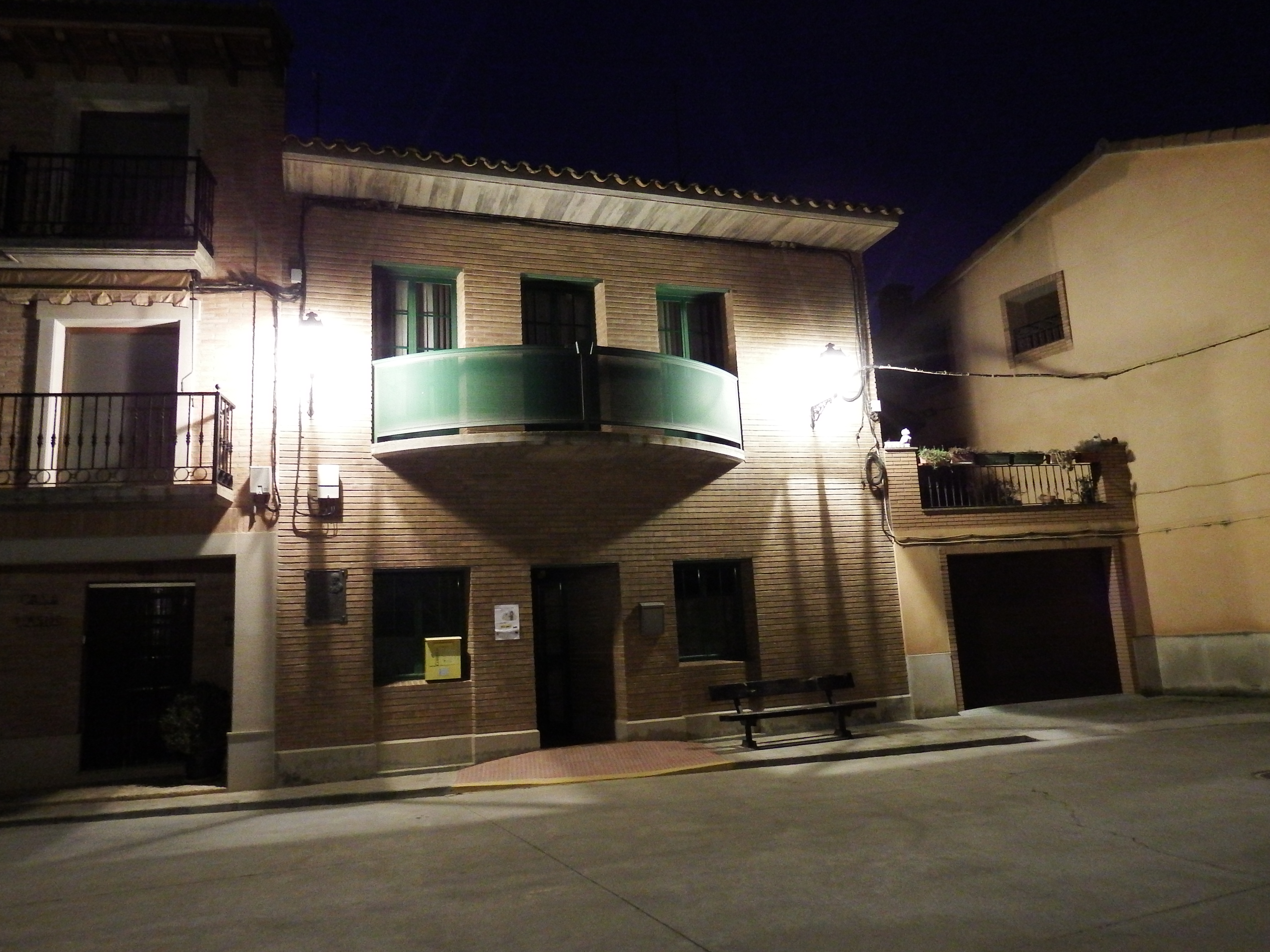
- Town hall

- Coat of arms

- Location in Spain
- Coordinates: 42°01′N 0°05′W
- Country: Spain
- Autonomous community: Aragon
- Province: Huesca
- Comarca: Somontano de Barbastro

Government
  - Mayor: Manuel Colungo Herrán (People's Party of Aragon)

Area
  - Total: 18.75 km^{2} (7.24 sq mi)
- Elevation: 468 m (1,535 ft)

Population (2025-01-01)
  - Total: 93
  - Density: 5.0/km^{2} (13/sq mi)
- Time zone: UTC+1 (CET)
  - Summer (DST): UTC+2 (CEST)
- Postal code: 22132

Barbuñales (Aragonese Barbunyals) is a municipality located in the province of Huesca, Aragon, Spain. According to the 2004 census (INE), the municipality had a population of 116. The naturalist Félix de Azara was born and died in Barbuñales,

== See also ==
- List of municipalities in Huesca
