= Colegio Pestalozzi (Peru) =

Swiss international school in Lima, Peru

Coordinates: 12.1235468°S 77.0157052°W

- German: Schweizer Schule Lima

Information
- Other name: Colegio Suizo del Perú
- School type: International school
- Established: 1943; 83 years ago

Colegio Pestalozzi (also the Colegio Suizo del Perú or German: Schweizer Schule Lima) is a Swiss international school in Miraflores District, Lima, Peru. It serves levels Vorkindergarten (preschool) through Sekundarstufe II (senior high school).

The school first opened in 1943 on leased property at Zela 205, San Isidro, Bosque El Olivar. The school was supposed to open in 1942 but the late arrival of the school's Swiss teacher, Dr. Conrad Huber, hampered by World War II, caused the opening to be delayed.

It was named after Johann Heinrich Pestalozzi.
