= Francisco Javier Ramos =

Spanish painter (1746–1817)

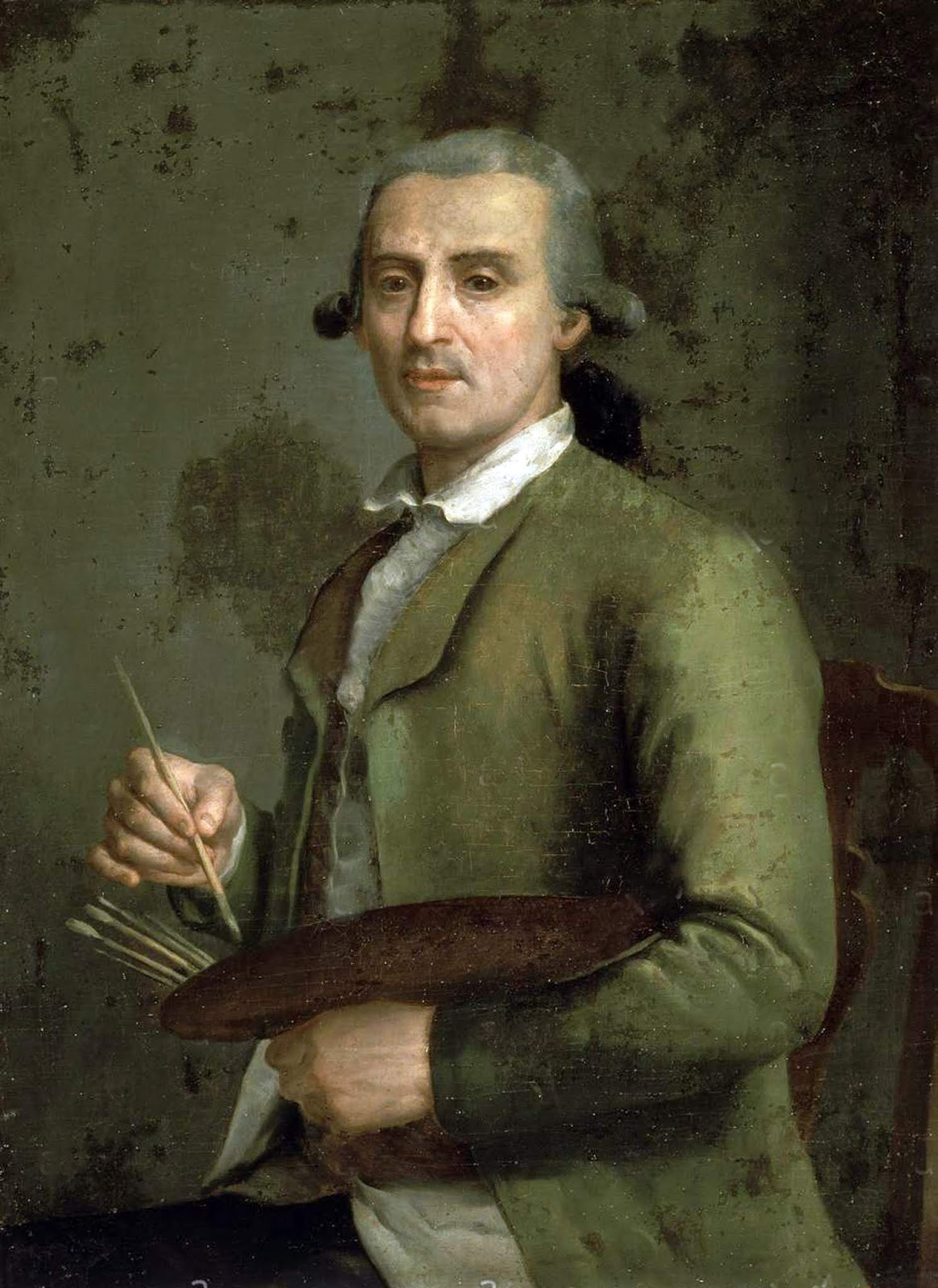
Self-portrait, oil on canvas, 98 x 72 cm, Museo de Bellas Artes de Granada.

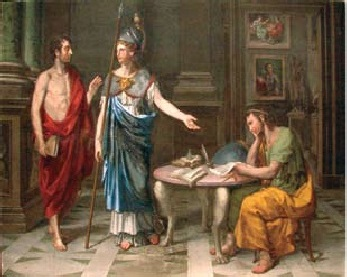
Two Philosophers with Minerva (portraits of Francesco Milizia, the princesa de Santacroce and possibly José Nicolás de Azara), Rome, Palazzo di Spagna.

Francisco Javier Ramos y Albertos (30 March 1746 – 11 October 1817) was a Spanish painter, born in Madrid. He became court painter to Charles IV of Spain and director of painting at the Real Academia de Bellas Artes de San Fernando.

== Bibliography ==
- García Sánchez, Jorge «Las colecciones del Palacio de España (siglos XVII y XVIII)» en El Palacio de España en Roma. Coleccionismo y antigüedades clásicas, Digital CSIC, EEHAR, 2010, pp. 17–36.
- Marqués de Lozoya, «Cartas dirigidas por D. José Nicolás de Azara al pintor de cámara D. Francisco Javier Ramos / Palabras preliminares de El Marqués de Lozoya», Academia, nº 8 (1959), pp. 13–27.
