= List of heads of state of Spain =

Spanish Royal Crown (heraldic representation)

This is a list of Spanish heads of state, that is, monarchs and presidents that governed the country of Spain in the modern sense of the word. For the forerunners of the Spanish throne, see the following:

- List of Asturian monarchs
- List of Navarrese monarchs
- List of monarchs of León
- List of Galician monarchs
- List of Aragonese monarchs
- List of Castilian monarchs

These lineages were eventually united by the marriage of the Catholic Monarchs, Ferdinand II of Aragon (king of the Crown of Aragon) and Isabella I of Castile (queen of the Crown of Castile). Although their kingdoms continued to be separate, with their personal union they ruled them together as one dominion. Spain was thereafter governed as a dynastic union by the House of Trastámara, the House of Habsburg, and the House of Bourbon until the Nueva Planta decrees merged Castile and Aragon into one kingdom.

During the First Spanish Republic (1873–1874), Spain had heads of state known as the President of the Executive Power. However, it is only during the Second Spanish Republic (1931–1939) that the official title of President of Spain (or President of the Republic) existed. Today, Spain is a constitutional monarchy, and there is thus no person holding the title of President of Spain. However, the prime minister holds the official title of President of the Government.

== Kingdom of Spain (1479–1873) ==
=== House of Trastámara (1479–1555) ===
Under Isabella and Ferdinand, the royal dynasties of Castile and Aragon, their respective kingdoms, were united into a single line. Historiography of Spain generally treats this as the formation of the kingdom of Spain, but in actuality, the two kingdoms continued for many centuries with their own separate institutions. It was not until the Nueva Planta decrees of the early 18th century that the two lands were formally merged into a single state.

Name	Lifespan	Reign start	Reign end	Notes	Family	Image
Isabella I: the Catholic; Spanish: Isabel I	22 April 1451 – 26 November 1504 (aged 53)	11 December 1474; Castile	26 November 1504; Castile	Daughter of John II of Castile and Isabella of Portugal	Trastámara	Isabella I of Castile
Ferdinand V & II: the Catholic; Spanish: Fernando V & II	10 March 1452 – 23 January 1516 (aged 63)	15 January 1475; Castile 20 January 1479; Aragon	26 November 1504; Castile 23 January 1516; Aragon	Son of John II of Aragon and Juana Enríquez	Trastámara	Ferdinand V of Castile and II of Aragon
Joanna: the Mad; Spanish: Juana I	6 November 1479 – 12 April 1555 (aged 75)	26 November 1504; Castile 23 January 1516; Aragon	12 April 1555	Daughter of Isabella I of Castile and Ferdinand II of Aragon	Trastámara	Joanna of Castile and Aragon (later: Joanna of Spain)
Philip I: the Handsome; Spanish: Felipe I	22 July 1478 – 25 September 1506 (aged 28)	27 June 1506; Castile	25 September 1506; Castile	Husband of Joanna of Castile	Habsburg	Philip I of Castile

=== House of Habsburg (1516–1700) ===
Following the deaths of Isabella (1504) and Ferdinand (1516), their daughter Joanna inherited the Spanish kingdoms. However, she was kept prisoner at Tordesillas due to her mental disorder. As Joanna's son, Charles I (the future Holy Roman Emperor, Charles V), did not want to be merely a regent, he proclaimed himself king of Castile and Aragon jointly with his mother. Subsequently, the Castilian and Aragonese Cortes recognized him as co-monarch along with his mother. Upon her death, he became sole King of Castile and Aragon, and the thrones were left permanently united to Philip II of Spain and successors. Traditional numbering of monarchs follows the Castilian crown; i.e. after King Ferdinand (II of Aragon and V of Castile jure uxoris as husband of Queen of Castille Isabella I), the next Ferdinand was numbered VI. Likewise, Alfonso XII takes his number following that of Alfonso XI of Castile rather than that of Alfonso V of Aragon, the prior Spanish monarchs with that name.

Portrait	Coat of arms	Name	Life	Reign	Titles	Claim
		Charles I (Emperor Charles V); Carlos I, el César Carlos	February 24, 1500 – September 21, 1558 (aged 58)	March 14, 1516 – January 16, 1556	Holy Roman Emperor; King of Germany and Italy; King of Spain, Sicily and Sardinia; King of Naples and Jerusalem; Archduke of Austria; Duke of Burgundy (Titular), Lord of the Netherlands	Son of Joanna of Castile, grandson of Isabella I and Ferdinand II
		Philip II, the Prudent; Felipe II, el Prudente	May 21, 1527 – September 13, 1598 (aged 71)	January 16, 1556 – September 13, 1598	King of Spain, Sicily and Sardinia; King of Naples and Jerusalem; King of Portugal (from 1580); King of England and Ireland (jure uxoris, 1554–1558); Duke of Burgundy (Titular), Lord of the Netherlands; Duke of Milan	Son of Charles I
		Philip III, the Pious; Felipe III, el Piadoso	April 14, 1578 – March 31, 1621 (aged 42)	September 13, 1598 – March 31, 1621	King of Spain, Portugal, Naples, Sicily and Sardinia; Duke of Milan	Son of Philip II
		Philip IV, the Great, the Planet King; Felipe IV, el Grande, el Rey Planeta	April 8, 1605 – September 17, 1665 (aged 60)	March 31, 1621 – September 17, 1665	King of Spain, Portugal (until 1640), Naples, Sicily and Sardinia; Duke of Milan; Sovereign of the Netherlands and Count Palatine of Burgundy	Son of Philip III
		Charles II, the Bewitched; Carlos II, el Hechizado	November 6, 1661 – November 1, 1700 (aged 38)	September 17, 1665 – November 1, 1700	King of Spain, Naples, Sicily and Sardinia; Duke of Milan; Sovereign of the Netherlands and Count Palatine of Burgundy	Son of Philip IV

Disputed claimant

Portrait	Coat of arms	Name	Life	Reign	Titles	Claim
		Archduke Charles of Austria, as Charles III; Archiduque Carlos, (Carlos III)	October 1, 1685 – October 20, 1740 (aged 55)	September 12, 1703 – July 2, 1715	King of Spain, Naples, Sicily and Sardinia; Duke of Milan; Sovereign of the Netherlands	Great-grandson of Philip III

In 1700 Charles II died. Charles' will named the 16-year-old Philip, the grandson of Charles' sister Maria Theresa of Spain and King Louis XIV of France, as his successor to the whole Spanish Empire. Upon any possible refusal of the undivided Spanish possessions, the Crown of Spain would be offered next to Philip's younger brother Charles, duc de Berry, or, next, to Archduke Charles of Austria.

Archduke Charles of Austria had a legal right to the Spanish throne due to the fact that Charles's father, Leopold I, Holy Roman Emperor, was the son of Charles' aunt Maria Anna of Austria, but Philip still had the better claim because Philip's grandfather, King Louis XIV, was the son of Charles' aunt Anne of Austria, the older of the sisters of Philip IV. However, Philip IV had stipulated in his will the succession should pass to the Austrian Habsburg line, and the Austrian branch also claimed that Maria Theresa of Spain, Philip's grandmother, had renounced the Spanish throne for herself and her descendants as part of her marriage contract. This was countered by the French claim that it was on the basis of a dowry that had never been paid.

Thus, the war broke out and Archduke Charles was proclaimed king of Spain, as Charles III, opposite to Philip V. Charles renounced his claims to the Spanish throne in the Treaty of Rastatt of 1714, but was allowed the continued use of the styles of a Spanish monarch for his lifetime. Philip ascended the Spanish throne but forever renounced his claim to the throne of France for himself and his descendants.

=== House of Bourbon (1700–1808) ===
Portrait	Coat of arms	Name	Life	Reign	Titles	Claim
		Philip V, the Spirited; Felipe V, el Animoso	December 19, 1683 – July 9, 1746 (aged 62)	November 16, 1700 – January 14, 1724 (abdicated in favor of his son)	King of Spain	Great-grandson of Philip IV
		Louis I, the Beloved, the Liberal; Luis I, el Bien Amado, el Liberal	August 25, 1707 – August 31, 1724 (aged 17)	January 14, 1724 – August 31, 1724 (ruled only 7 months before his death)	King of Spain	Son of Philip V
		Philip V, the Spirited; Felipe V, el Animoso	December 19, 1683 – July 9, 1746 (aged 62)	September 6, 1724 – July 9, 1746 (reinstated on death of his son)	King of Spain	Father of Louis I
		Ferdinand VI, the Learned, the Just; Fernando VI, el Prudente, el Justo	September 23, 1713 – August 10, 1759 (aged 45)	July 9, 1746 – August 10, 1759	King of Spain	Son of Philip V
		Charles III, the Enlightened, the King-Mayor; Carlos III, el Político	January 20, 1716 – December 14, 1788 (aged 72)	August 10, 1759 – December 14, 1788	King of Spain	Son of Philip V
		Charles IV, the Hunter; Carlos IV, el Cazador	November 11, 1748 – January 20, 1819 (aged 70)	December 14, 1788 – March 19, 1808	King of Spain	Son of Charles III
		Ferdinand VII, the Desired, the Felon King; Fernando VII, el Deseado, el Rey Felón	October 14, 1784 – September 29, 1833 (aged 48)	March 19, 1808 – May 6, 1808	King of Spain	Son of Charles IV

=== House of Bonaparte (1808–1813) ===
The only monarch from this dynasty was Joseph I, imposed by his brother Napoleon I of France after Charles IV and Ferdinand VII had abdicated. The title used by Joseph was King of the Spains and the Indias, by divine grace and the Constitution of the State. He was also later given all of the titles of the previous kings. A government in opposition to the French was formed in Cádiz on 25 September 1808, which continued to recognize the imprisoned Ferdinand VII as king. This government was diplomatically recognized as the legitimate Spanish government by Britain and other countries at war with France.

Portrait	Coat of arms	Name	Life	Reign	Titles	Claim
		Joseph I, the Intruder, Bottle Joe; José I, el Intruso, Pepe Botella	January 7, 1768 – July 28, 1844 (aged 76)	June 6, 1808 – December 11, 1813	King of Spain; King of Naples and Sicily and the Indies; Comte de Survilliers	No relationship, appointee and elder brother of Napoleon Bonaparte

=== House of Bourbon (1813–1868; first restoration) ===
Ferdinand VII, Charles IV's eldest son, was restored to the throne by Napoleon I of France. Again the title used was king of Castile, Leon, Aragon,… by divine grace.

Portrait	Coat of arms	Name	Life	Reign	Titles	Claim
		Ferdinand VII, the Desired, the Felon King; Fernando VII, el Deseado, el Rey Felón	October 14, 1784 – September 29, 1833 (aged 48)	December 11, 1813 – September 29, 1833	King of Spain	Son of Charles IV
		Isabella II, the One with the Sad Destinies; Isabel II, la de los Tristes Destinos	October 10, 1830 – April 9, 1904 (aged 73)	September 29, 1833 – September 30, 1868	Queen of Spain	Daughter of Ferdinand VII

=== House of Savoy (1870–1873) ===
After the Spanish Revolution of 1868 deposed Isabella II, there was established a provisional government and a regency headed by Francisco Serrano y Domínguez, who acted as Head of State, from October 8, 1868, until December 4, 1870, while it requested a new monarch. Amadeo I was elected as king and the new title used was King of Spain, by divine grace and will of nation.

Portrait	Coat of arms	Name	Life	Reign	Titles	Claim
		Amadeo I, the Gentleman King, Amadeo I, el Rey Caballero	May 30, 1845 – January 18, 1890 (aged 44)	December 4, 1870 – February 11, 1873	King of Spain	Descendant of Philip II (through his grandson Thomas Francis) and of Charles III (through his son Ferdinand I of the Two Sicilies and his daughter Maria Luisa)

== First Spanish Republic (1873–1874) ==
The First Spanish Republic started with the abdication as King of Spain on February 10, 1873, of Amadeo I, following the Hidalgo Affair, when he had been required by the radical government to sign a decree against the artillery officers. The next day, February 11, the republic was declared by a parliamentary majority made up of radicals, republicans and democrats. It lasted twenty-three months.

=== Presidents of the Republic ===
Portrait	Coat of arms	Name (Birth–Death)	Term of office		Political affiliation
		Estanislao Figueras (1819–1882)	February 12, 1873	June 11, 1873	Federal Democratic Republican Party
		Francesc Pi i Margall (1824–1901)	June 11, 1873	July 18, 1873	Federal Democratic Republican Party
		Nicolás Salmerón y Alonso (1838–1908)	July 18, 1873	September 7, 1873	Federal Democratic Republican Party
		Emilio Castelar y Ripoll (1832–1899)	September 7, 1873	January 3, 1874	Federal Democratic Republican Party
		Francisco Serrano; 1st Duke of la Torre (1810–1885)	January 3, 1874	December 30, 1874	Constitutional Party

== Kingdom of Spain (1874–1931) ==
=== House of Bourbon (1874–1931; second restoration) ===
Isabella II's eldest son was restored to the throne. Constitutional king of Spain. Between the death of Alfonso XII and the birth of Alfonso XIII, there was a period of seven months where the pregnant Queen Maria Christina served as Head of State with the title of Regent for her daughter María de las Mercedes, who was declared to be "Queen in Name" until the gender of her baby sibling was known.

Portrait	Coat of arms	Name	Life	Reign	Titles	Claim
		Alfonso XII, the Peacemaker; Alfonso XII, el Pacificador	November 28, 1857 – November 25, 1885 (aged 27)	December 30, 1874 – November 25, 1885	Constitutional King of Spain	Son of Isabella II
		Alfonso XIII, the African; Alfonso XIII, el Africano	May 17, 1886 – February 28, 1941 (aged 54)	May 17, 1886 – April 14, 1931	Constitutional King of Spain	Son of Alfonso XII

== Second Spanish Republic (1931–1939) ==
The Second Spanish Republic was the system of government in Spain between April 14, 1931, when Alfonso XIII left the country following a period of social unrest after the collapse of General Primo de Rivera's dictatorship a year earlier, and April 1, 1939, when the last of the Republican (republicanos) forces surrendered to the Nationalist (nacionales) forces led by Francisco Franco, at the end of the Spanish Civil War.

=== Presidents of the Republic ===
Portrait	Coat of arms	Name (Birth–Death)	Term of office		Political affiliation
		Niceto Alcalá-Zamora (1877–1949)	December 10, 1931	April 7, 1936	Liberal Republican Right
		Diego Martínez Barrio (1883–1962); Interim	April 7, 1936	May 10, 1936	Republican Union; Popular Front coalition
		Manuel Azaña (1880–1940)	May 10, 1936	March 3, 1939	Republican Left; Popular Front coalition
		Segismundo Casado (1893–1968); Interim	March 4, 1939	March 13, 1939	Republican Army; National Defence Council
		José Miaja (1878–1958); Interim	March 13, 1939	March 27, 1939	Republican Army; National Defence Council

== Spanish Republican government in exile (1939–1977) ==
=== Presidents of the Republic in exile ===
Portrait	Coat of arms	Name (Birth–Death)	Term of office		Political affiliation
		Diego Martínez Barrio (1883–1962); Interim	March 4, 1939	May 11, 1940	Republican Union
		Álvaro de Albornoz y Liminiana (1879–1954); Interim	May 11, 1940	August 17, 1945	Independent
		Diego Martínez Barrio (1883–1962)	August 17, 1945	January 1, 1962	Republican Union
		Luis Jiménez de Asúa (1889–1970)	January 1, 1962	November 16, 1970	Spanish Socialist Workers' Party
		José Maldonado González (1900–1985)	November 16, 1970	July 1, 1977	Republican Left

== Francoist Spain (1936–1975) ==
On October 1, 1936, General Francisco Franco was proclaimed Head of State (Caudillo) in parts of Spain controlled by Nationalist (nacionales) forces after the Spanish Civil War broke out. After the end of the war on April 1, 1939, General Franco took control of the whole of Spain. In 1947, Franco proclaimed the restoration of the monarchy, but did not allow the pretender, Juan de Borbón, Count of Barcelona, to take the throne. In 1969, in accordance with the Law of Succession to the Headship of the State, Franco declared that Juan Carlos (the Count of Barcelona's son), styled as the Prince of Spain, would be his successor. After Franco's death in 1975, Juan Carlos succeeded him as the King of Spain.

Portrait	Coat of arms	Name (Birth–Death)	Term of office		Political affiliation
Head of State (Caudillo)
		Francisco Franco (1892–1975)	October 1, 1936	November 20, 1975	FET y de las JONS (after 1937); National Movement
President of the Regency
		Alejandro Rodríguez de Valcárcel (1917–1976)	November 20, 1975	November 22, 1975	National Movement

== Kingdom of Spain (1975–present) ==
=== House of Bourbon (1975–present; third restoration) ===
Alfonso XIII's claim descended (due to his two eldest sons' renunciations) to his third son, Infante Juan, Count of Barcelona, who was passed over in favour of his eldest son, whose title became King of Spain. The Count of Barcelona renounced his claims in favour of his son in 1977, two years after Franco's death and Juan Carlos's accession.

Juan Carlos I abdicated in favor of his son Felipe VI, who became King on 19 June 2014, with Felipe's eldest daughter, Leonor, Princess of Asturias, next in succession.

Portrait	Coat of arms	Name	Life	Reign	Titles	Claim
		Juan Carlos I	January 5, 1938 (age 88)	November 22, 1975 – June 19, 2014	King of Spain	Grandson of Alfonso XIII, through his third son, Infante Juan, Count of Barcelona
		Felipe VI	January 30, 1968 (age 58)	June 19, 2014 – present	King of Spain	Son of Juan Carlos I

== See also ==
- Monarchy of Spain
  - List of Spanish monarchs
  - List of Spanish regents
  - Family tree of Spanish monarchs
  - Succession to the Spanish throne
  - List of Spanish royal consorts
- War of the Spanish Succession
- President of the Republic (Spain)
- Prime Minister of Spain
  - List of prime ministers of Spain
- Carlism – about pretenders who have tried to substitute the Isabelline monarchs.
