= Spanish Republic (disambiguation) =

The Spanish Republic was the form of government in Spain from 1931 to 1939, often called the Second Spanish Republic.

Spanish Republic may also refer to:

- First Spanish Republic (1873–1874)
- Spanish Republican government in exile
- Republicanism in Spain
