= Josefa Saisó Sempere =

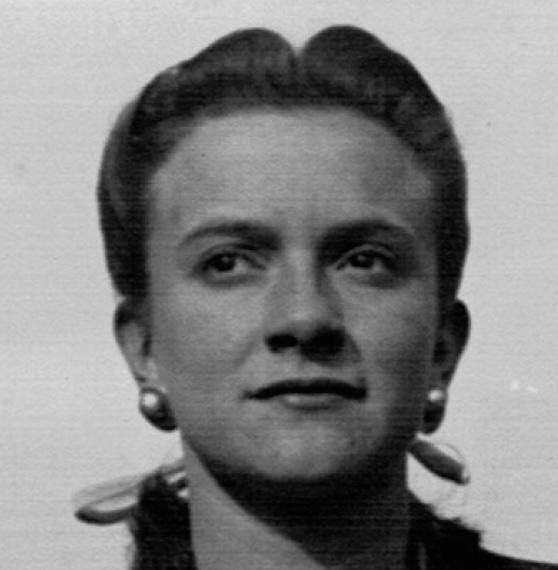
- Born: Josefa Saisó Sempere; 1929; Valencia
- Died: 1997 (aged 67–68); Mexico City
- Education: National Autonomous University of Mexico
- Occupation: Architect

Josefa Saisó Sempere (Valencia, 1929 – Mexico City, 1997) was an architect and academic who belonged to Spanish republican exile in Mexico.

== Biography ==
She was born in Valencia in 1929. She left the port of Portbou and arrived in Veracruz in 1937.

== Career ==
She studied at the National School of Architecture of the National Autonomous University of Mexico, where she graduated in 1962. Later he taught "Theory of Architecture" at the same university. She was part of the "Autogobierno UNAM" programme and coordinator of Taller Uno. She was a professor in the Technology area and coordinator of professional exams. The auditorium of the Faculty of Architecture bears her name, "Pepita Saisó".

She worked in an office with Cuauhtémoc Vega, with whom she won in 1985 the National Competition for Housing in Wood.
