= José Maldonado González =

Exiled Spanish politician

President of the Spanish Republic in exile
- In office 16 November 1970 – 21 June 1977
- Prime Minister: Claudio Sánchez-Albornoz Fernando Valera Aparicio
- Preceded by: Luis Jiménez de Asúa
- Succeeded by: Government-in-exile abolished Juan Carlos I (as King)

Personal details
- Born: 12 November 1900 Tineo, Asturias, Kingdom of Spain
- Died: 11 February 1985 (aged 84) Oviedo, Asturias, Kingdom of Spain

José Maldonado González (12 November 1900 – 11 February 1985) was the last president of the Spanish Republican government in exile. Elected in the 1936 Spanish general election as a deputy for Oviedo province, he was a member of the Izquierda Republicana party, which formed part of the Frente Popular. In 1938, several months before the end of the Spanish Civil War and the fall of the Second Spanish Republic, Maldonado fled to France.

Already in exile, Maldonado held positions in many parts of the national Republican government, such as Minister of Justice (1949–1951) and Minister of Justice and Information (1962–1971).

At a more practical level, Maldonado lived in Paris and held a variety of teaching jobs. He was also active as a Freemason.

In 1970, he succeeded Luis Jiménez de Asúa as President of the Republic in exile. In 1977, he recognized the elections in Spain and disbanded the Republic in exile, as agreed with president José López Portillo of Mexico.

He finished his days back in Oviedo, dying in 1984.

Political offices
| Preceded by Manuel García Fernández-Argüelles | Mayor of Tineo; May 1931 – October 1933 | Succeeded by Rafael Llanes Argüelles |
| Preceded by Luis Jiménez de Asúa | President of the Spanish Republic in exile 16 November 1970 – 21 June 1977 | Position abolished |
