= Republicanism in Spain =

Political position and movement

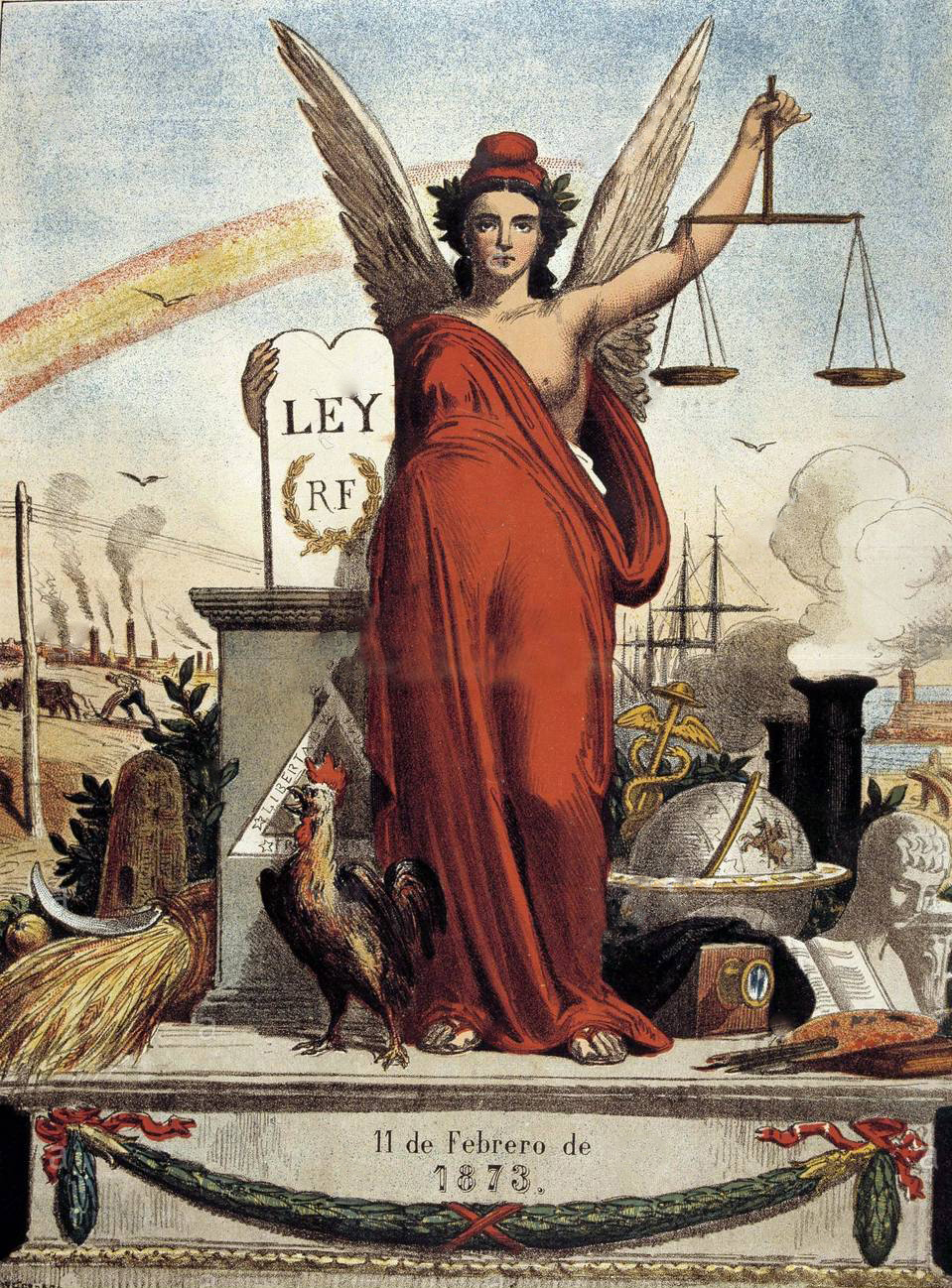
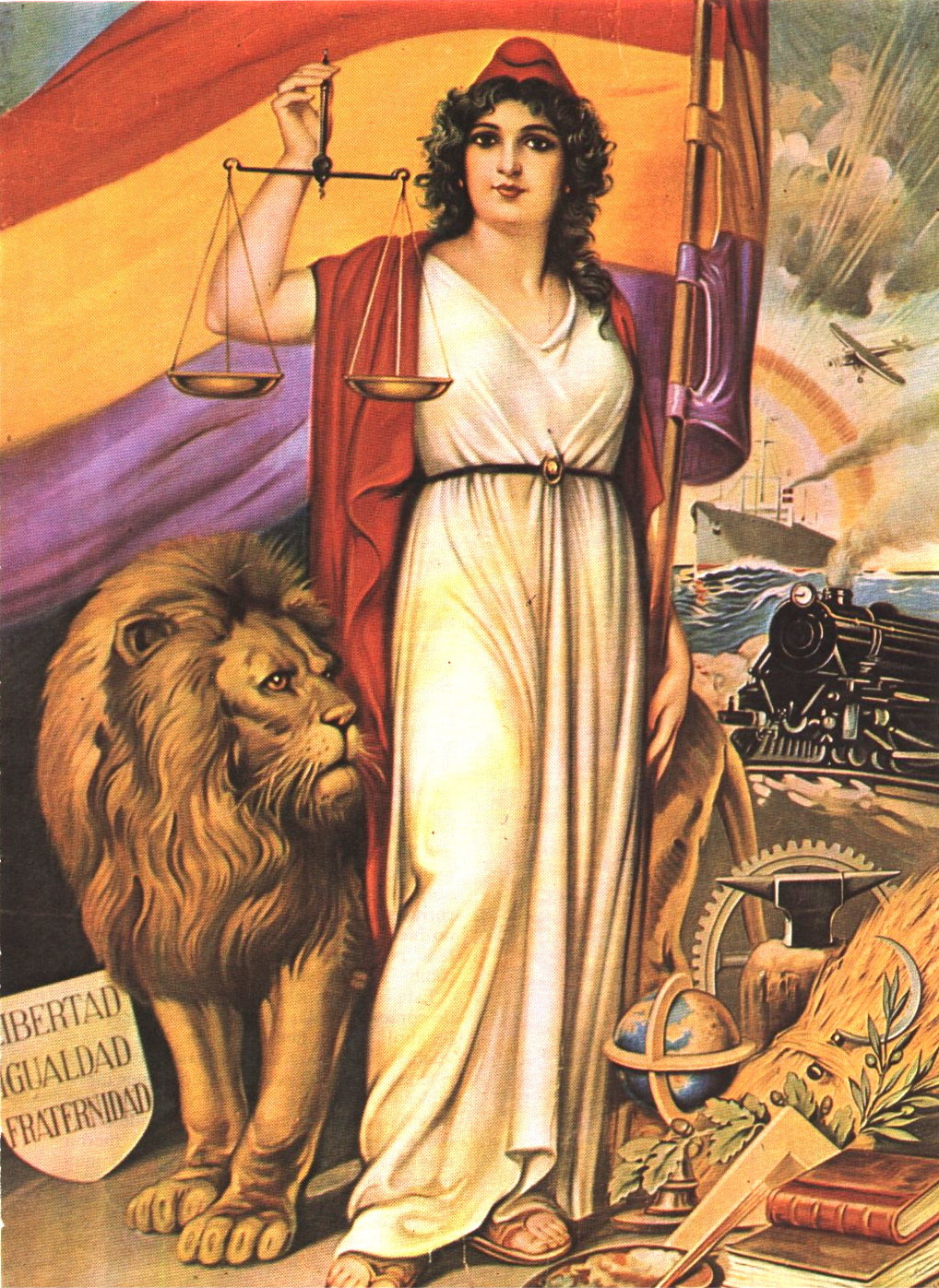
Allegories of the First Spanish Republic (left, 1873) and the Second Spanish republic (right, 1931).

Republicanism in Spain is a political position and historical movement that advocates the reestablishment of a republic in Spain in place of the Spanish monarchy.

Spanish republicanism has not been a single doctrine or organisation. Since the nineteenth century it has included federal, unitary, liberal, democratic, anticlerical, social-reformist, socialist and regional nationalist currents. These currents have shared opposition to dynastic monarchy, but have differed over the territorial organisation of the state, the relationship between religion and public life, social reform, and the means by which a republic should be achieved.

Spain has been governed as a republic during two periods: the First Spanish Republic from February 1873 to December 1874, and the Second Spanish Republic from April 1931 to April 1939. The latter was defeated in the Spanish Civil War and survived institutionally only in exile until the Spanish transition to democracy.

Under the constitutional parliamentary monarchy established after Francoism, republicanism has remained present in political parties, social movements and public debate. It is most closely associated with the political left, but republican positions have also appeared in liberal, federalist, regional nationalist and other political traditions.

== History ==
=== Origins and nineteenth-century formation ===
The origins of modern Spanish republicanism are usually placed in the last years of the eighteenth century and the early nineteenth century, under the impact of the French Revolution and the French First Republic. Historians have nevertheless described those origins as complex, since the word republic had previously been used in learned and classical senses and did not always imply an anti-monarchical programme. French republican symbols, including tricolour flags, female allegories, the Phrygian cap and La Marseillaise, later became part of Spanish republican political culture.

Early Spanish republicanism developed slowly and was often viewed by its opponents as synonymous with Jacobinism, social disorder or anti-clericalism. The Conspiracy of San Blas of 1795 has sometimes been cited as an early episode, although its programme did not explicitly abolish monarchy. Clearer republican expressions appeared during the Trienio Liberal (1820–1823), especially among the most radical liberals, the so-called exaltados.

After the restoration of absolutism in 1823, republican ideas circulated among liberal exiles and were often combined with federalism and Iberism. Writers such as José Canga Argüelles praised the new republican governments in the Americas, while Ramón Xaudaró y Fábregas proposed a federal republican system in Bases d'une Constitution Politique (1832). These writings had little immediate political effect, but they helped define the vocabulary of Spanish federal republicanism.

During the reign of Isabella II republicanism became more visible in urban democratic, anticlerical and federal circles. Barcelona was one of its main centres. Xaudaró published El Catalán there in 1835 and was later executed after taking part in the disturbances of 1837. Secret societies, local juntas and newspapers helped spread republican language, although the movement was still fragmented. Abdón Terradas, another early Catalan republican, led a short-lived republican proclamation in Figueres in 1842 and used the newspaper El Republicano to continue his agitation.

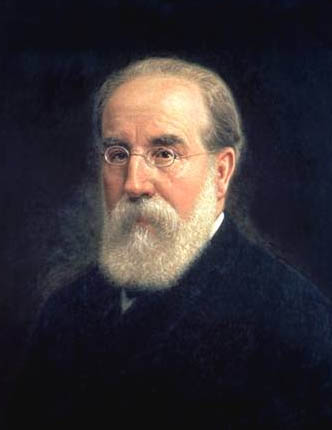
Francisco Pi y Margall, one of the main theorists of Spanish federal republicanism.

The 1840s were decisive for the formation of a republican-democratic current. Republican candidates achieved local electoral successes in several cities during the regency of Baldomero Espartero, although these results were often obtained through alliances with the left wing of the Progressive Party. In this period republicans formulated a programme that went beyond replacing monarchy: they associated the republic with universal male suffrage, freedom of the press and association, secular education, the reduction of privilege, social reform and the rationalisation of public life.

A democratic faction emerged inside the Progressive Party around figures such as José María Orense, Nicolás María Rivero and José Ordax Avecilla. In 1849 this current founded the Democratic Party, whose initial programme defended universal suffrage, civil liberties, a single chamber based on national sovereignty and state action to reduce social inequality. Although its first manifesto still accepted the throne of Isabella II, its political demands placed it close to republicanism. During the 1850s and 1860s the party increasingly identified with republicanism. Its internal debates included federalism, individual rights, social reform and the relationship between democracy and socialism. Francisco Pi y Margall became the most important federal theorist, while Emilio Castelar represented a more liberal-democratic current.

=== Democratic Sexennium and First Republic ===
The Glorious Revolution of 1868 overthrew Isabella II and opened the Democratic Sexennium. The provisional government favoured a constitutional monarchy, but the republican majority of the old Democratic Party reorganised itself as the Federal Democratic Republican Party. The minority that accepted monarchy as compatible with democracy became known as the cimbrios.

Federal republicans were divided over both social reform and political method. Some favoured legal action and parliamentary tactics; others defended insurrection and the construction of the federal republic "from below". Provincial and regional federal pacts, beginning with the Pact of Tortosa in 1869, sought to organise republican federalism around local and regional structures. Republican uprisings in 1869 and 1870, partly linked to opposition to military conscription, were suppressed by the army.

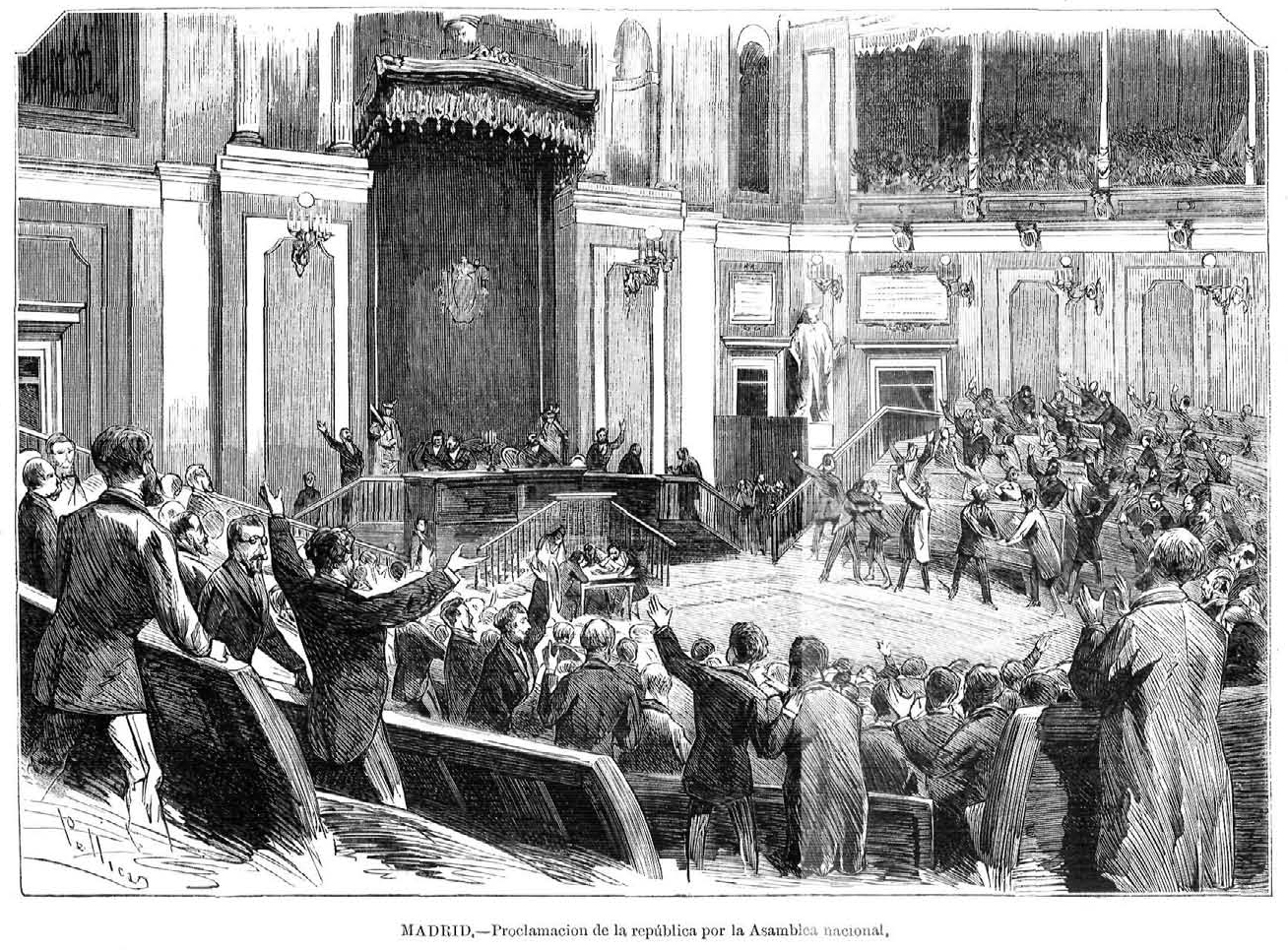
Proclamation of the First Republic by the National Assembly.

On 11 February 1873, after the abdication of Amadeo I, the Cortes proclaimed the First Spanish Republic. The new regime was born in a context of war in Cuba, the Third Carlist War, social unrest and fiscal weakness. It was also weakened by divisions among republicans. Federal republicans formed the majority, but they were divided between intransigents, centrists around Pi y Margall, reformist democrats around Nicolás Salmerón and more liberal republicans around Castelar.

The Republic had four presidents of the executive power in less than a year: Estanislao Figueras, Pi y Margall, Salmerón and Castelar. In June 1873 the Constituent Cortes declared that Spain would be a federal democratic republic, but the federal constitution was not approved. The Cantonal rebellion of 1873, especially the Canton of Cartagena, revealed the gap between federalists who wanted a constitutional federation created from above and intransigents who sought immediate local sovereignty.

On 3 January 1874 General Manuel Pavía dissolved the Cortes by force. The republic formally continued under Francisco Serrano, but in a unitary and authoritarian form. The Pronunciamiento of Sagunto by Arsenio Martínez Campos on 29 December 1874 restored the Bourbon monarchy in the person of Alfonso XII.

=== Bourbon Restoration and republican renewal ===
During the early Bourbon Restoration, republicanism was excluded from power and divided into several parties. Pi y Margall led the federal republicans; Manuel Ruiz Zorrilla promoted an insurrectionary republicanism from exile; Salmerón increasingly favoured legal and parliamentary methods; and Castelar defended a possibilist strategy of cooperation with liberal monarchists if democratic reforms were accepted.

Republican organisation during the Restoration combined parliamentary groups, newspapers, local committees and republican clubs or casinos. It was strongest in urban settings and among sectors of the middle classes, artisans and workers, but it struggled against the electoral machinery of the Restoration regime. Even after the restoration of universal male suffrage in 1890, electoral fraud and clientelist networks limited republican representation. Castelar dissolved his possibilist party after the adoption of universal male suffrage and advised his followers to join the Liberal Party. After the deaths of Ruiz Zorrilla, Castelar and Pi y Margall, Salmerón became the main historical republican leader until his death in 1908.

At the turn of the twentieth century, historians distinguish between the old republicanism inherited from the First Republic and a new republicanism that sought modern mass politics. Vicente Blasco Ibáñez in Valencia and Alejandro Lerroux in Barcelona developed powerful urban republican movements with strong anticlerical, populist and working-class appeal.

In 1903 Salmerón sponsored the creation of the Republican Union, an attempt to unite most republican currents through electoral politics. It performed well in the 1903 general election, but soon divided between a moderate or "governmental" wing and a more radical current led by Lerroux. The latter founded the Radical Republican Party in 1908. The repression following the Tragic Week of 1909 helped produce the Republican–Socialist Conjunction, an alliance between republicans and the Spanish Socialist Workers' Party (PSOE). A more moderate tendency around Melquíades Álvarez created the Reformist Party, which later adopted an accidentalist position on the form of government and moved closer to the monarchy.

=== Dictatorship of Primo de Rivera and the fall of the monarchy ===
The coup d'état of Miguel Primo de Rivera found republicanism organisationally weak. Nevertheless, the dictatorship helped bring new sectors into republican opposition. Manuel Azaña, formerly linked to reformism, founded Republican Action after concluding that democratisation within the monarchy was no longer viable.

In 1926 the Republican Alliance was created by old and new republican forces, including Lerroux's Radical Republican Party, Azaña's Republican Action, the federal republicans and Catalan republican groups. It called for constituent Cortes elected by universal suffrage and committed its members to remain united until the dictatorship fell. Republicanism also attracted parts of the urban middle classes, professionals and small business owners dissatisfied with Primo de Rivera's authoritarian and interventionist policies.

After Primo de Rivera resigned in January 1930, the monarchy of Alfonso XIII lost support rapidly. In August 1930 republican groups, joined by Catalan nationalists and later by socialists, reached the Pact of San Sebastián, which prepared a strategy to end the monarchy and establish a republic. The failed Jaca uprising of December 1930 and the execution of the captains Fermín Galán and Ángel García Hernández strengthened republican symbolism.

Municipal elections held on 12 April 1931 became a de facto test of the monarchy. Republican candidates won in most major cities. On 14 April the Second Spanish Republic was proclaimed, Alfonso XIII left Spain, and a provisional government headed by Niceto Alcalá-Zamora took power.

=== Second Republic and Civil War ===
The Second Spanish Republic brought republicanism to power for the second time. Its 1931 Constitution established a democratic, secular and decentralised republic, extended suffrage to women and allowed provinces to form autonomous regions. The first governments included liberal Catholic republicans, left republicans, radicals and socialists, although the coalition soon fractured over religion, social reform and the role of the PSOE in government.

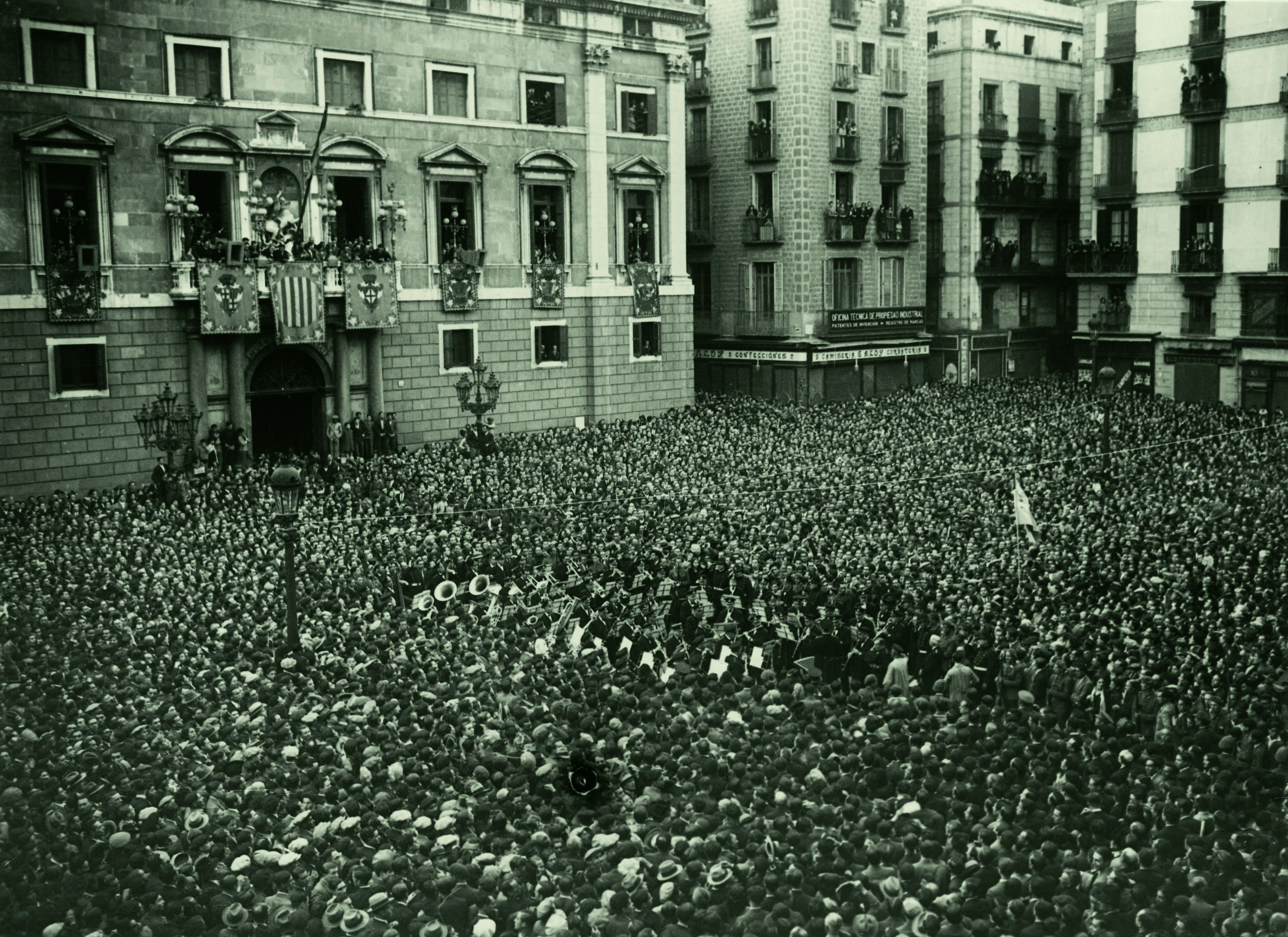
Proclamation of the Second Republic in the Plaça de Sant Jaume, Barcelona, 14 April 1931.

The first biennium, led by Azaña and supported by a republican-socialist coalition, pursued reforms in the army, education, church-state relations, labour law, regional autonomy and agrarian policy. These reforms mobilised support among republican and labour movements but also produced strong resistance from conservative, Catholic, monarchist and military sectors. The centre-right victory in the 1933 elections brought governments led by Lerroux's Radical Republican Party with parliamentary support, and later participation, from the Spanish Confederation of the Autonomous Right (CEDA).

The entry of CEDA ministers into government in October 1934 triggered a revolutionary general strike and an armed uprising in Asturias, while the Catalan government proclaimed a "Catalan State" within a Spanish federal republic. The failure and repression of the October events intensified polarisation. In 1934, Azaña's Republican Left was formed from Republican Action and other left-republican groups, while Diego Martínez Barrio's Republican Union emerged from a split in the Radical Republican Party.

For the 1936 elections, left republicans formed an electoral alliance with the PSOE and other labour organisations, later known as the Popular Front. Its programme was primarily that of the left republicans: amnesty for those imprisoned after October 1934, restoration of the reformist legislation of the first biennium and the resumption of regional autonomy processes. After the Popular Front victory, Azaña formed a government composed only of left republicans. In May 1936 he became President of the Republic and Santiago Casares Quiroga became prime minister.

The military uprising of 17–18 July 1936 failed to seize the whole state and led to the Spanish Civil War. The republican state survived in the territory loyal to the government, but the authority of republican parties was soon overwhelmed by war, social revolution and the growing importance of socialist, communist and anarchist organisations. During the war, governments under José Giral, Francisco Largo Caballero and Juan Negrín attempted to combine military resistance with political control of the loyal zone. The Republic was defeated in 1939 after Francoist victory, mass exile and the establishment of the Franco dictatorship.

=== Exile, Francoism and transition ===
After the Civil War, republican organisations were eliminated inside Francoist Spain through repression, executions, imprisonment, exile and the closure of republican cultural and political spaces. A Spanish Republican government in exile was established in 1939. Thousands of republicans fled to France; many were later detained after the German occupation and some 7,000 Spaniards died in Nazi concentration camps, especially Mauthausen-Gusen.

In exile, republican politics remained divided over strategy. In Mexico, Martínez Barrio helped create Acción Republicana Española in 1941, defending a liberal and democratic republic. In 1943 republican, socialist and nationalist groups formed the Junta Española de Liberación, while in Spain interior opposition groups created the Alianza Nacional de Fuerzas Democráticas in 1944. These initiatives sought international support after the Second World War, but failed to bring down Francoism.

During the Spanish transition to democracy, the main anti-Franco opposition parties prioritised political freedoms, legalisation, amnesty and regional autonomy over restoration of the republic. The PCE and PSOE accepted the parliamentary monarchy of Juan Carlos I within the new constitutional settlement, while historical republican parties obtained little electoral support outside Catalonia. The Republican government-in-exile dissolved itself in 1977 and recognised the new democratic framework. The Spanish Constitution of 1978 established Spain as a parliamentary monarchy, but republicanism remained present in parties, civic associations and public debate.

== Public opinion ==
Spain's government-run Centro de Investigaciones Sociológicas has not conducted any surveys in which respondents were asked their preference of the system of government, monarchy or republic. However, the CIS has published surveys on the "value" respondents place on the monarchy, and the agency has occasionally published questions regarding the current monarch, observing a progressive decline in support for the monarchy. Studies show that the monarchy has experienced declining public confidence more than any other government institution, especially among youths aged 18 to 24, who have expressed negative opinions about the monarchy in CIS studies since 2006. For the first time ever in 2011, a majority of the population said they did not support the current monarchy. However, the CIS ceased surveying views of the monarchy after April 2015, when poll respondents gave it an average rating of 4.34 out of 10.

A study published on 24 June 2004 found 55% of Spaniards agreeing ("más bien de acuerdo") with the statement that "the Monarchy discussion is long ago a thing of the past." (Note: The statement "the Monarchy is something that has long overstayed its welcome", is badly translated. The actually Spanish wording used is "la Monarquía es algo superado hace tiempo", which means "that discussion is long ago a thing of the past".) In 2016, it was revealed that during a 1995 interview, Adolfo Suárez had confessed that he included the word 'King' in the 1977 Political Reform Act in order to avoid a referendum on republic, as secret surveys reportedly commissioned by the State did not deliver a favorable results for the monarchist option back at the time.

Spanish newspapers also sporadically publish surveys and opinion polls with questions related to the monarchy and of the survey respondents' political affiliation as monarchist or republican, among other options:

| Polling firm/Commissioner | Fieldwork date | Sample size | Republic | Monarchy | Neither/ Indifferent | Question | Lead |
|---|---|---|---|---|---|---|---|
| Ateneo del Dato/elDiario.es | 9–11 Oct 2026 | 1,500 | 37% | 37% | 15% | 11% | Tie |
| UMU/The Crowns | 10 May 2026 | 800 | 51.5% | 48.5% | – | – | 3.0 |
| EM-Analytics/Electomanía | 5–10 Apr 2026 | 1,597 | 55.1% | 43.8% | – | 1.1% | 11.3 |
| EM-Analytics/Electomanía | 5–10 Apr 2025 | 2,401 | 51.9% | 42.4% | – | 5.7% | 9.5 |
| EM-Analytics/Electomanía | 14–27 Sep 2024 | 2,080 | 54.1% | 42.5% | – | 3.4% | 11.6 |
| SocioMétrica/El Español | 10–13 Jun 2024 | 800 | 37.4% | 48.3% | – | 14.3% | 10.9 |
| SocioMétrica/El Español | 25–31 Dec 2023 | 2,309 | 32.8% | 58.6% | – | 8.6% | 25.8 |
| Simple Lógica/elDiario.es | 2–13 Nov 2023 | 1,021 | 44.7% | 43.5% | – | 11.8% | 1.2 |
| NC Report/La Razón | 20–25 Oct 2023 | 1,000 | 31.4% | 65.7% | – | 2.9% | 34.3 |
| EM-Analytics/Electomanía | 26 Jul–4 Aug 2023 | 5,213 | 53.1% | 44.7% | – | 2.2% | 8.4 |
| EM-Analytics/Electomanía | 29 Jan–4 Feb 2022 | 2,308 | 51.7% | 44.3% | – | 4.0% | 7.4 |
| SW Demoscopia/Grupo Viva | 23–24 Nov 2021 | 600 | 43.8% | 56.2% | – | – | 12.4 |
| InvyMark/laSexta | 11–15 Oct 2021 | ? | 45.8% | 44.3% | 9.3% | 0.6% | 1.5 |
| 40dB/PMI | 24 Sep–4 Oct 2021 | 1,000 | 39.4% | 31.0% | 15.9% | 13.7% | 8.4 |
| EM-Analytics/Electomanía | 27 Aug–3 Sep 2021 | 1,640 | 48.0% | 49.9% | – | 2.1% | 1.9 |
| GAD3/ABC | 16–22 Jul 2021 | 1,030 | 36.9% | 55.3% | 4.4% | 3.4% | 18.4 |
| NC Report/La Razón | 16–18 Jun 2021 | 1,000 | 38.9% | 53.7% | – | 7.4% | 14.8 |
| EM-Analytics/Electomanía | 4–12 Apr 2021 | 3,117 | 46.8% | 49.4% | – | 3.9% | 2.6 |
| 40dB/PMI | 5 Oct 2020 | 3,000 | 40.9% | 34.9% | 11.3% | 12.9% | 6.0 |
| ElectoPanel/Electomanía | 7–11 Sep 2020 | 1,227 | 47.6% | 48.0% | – | 4.3% | 0.4 |
| GAD3/ABC | 16 Aug 2020 | ? | 33.5% | 56.3% | 10.1% | | 22.8 |
| Sigma Dos/El Mundo | 10 Aug 2020 | ? | 38.5% | 48.4% | 7.9% | 5.3% | 9.9 |
| NC Report/La Razón | 6–8 Aug 2020 | 1,000 | 38.5% | 54.8% | – | 6.7% | 16.3 |
| SocioMétrica/El Español | 4–5 Aug 2020 | 2,040 | 40.8% | 54.9% | – | 4.3% | 14.1 |
| ElectoPanel/Electomanía | 3 Aug 2020 | 1,530 | 55.5% | 39.4% | – | 5.1% | 16.1 |
| NC Report/La Razón | 21–24 Jul 2020 | 1,000 | 31.5% | 58.3% | – | 10.2% | 26.8 |
| ElectoPanel/Electomanía | 9–10 Jul 2020 | 1,100 | 53.1% | 44.4% | – | 2.6% | 8.7 |
| InvyMark/laSexta | 6–10 Jul 2020 | ? | 39.0% | 31.2% | 29.3% | 0.5% | 7.8 |
| SocioMétrica/El Español | 6–10 Jul 2020 | 1,690 | 49.3% | 48.9% | – | 1.8% | 0.4 |
| ElectoPanel/Electomanía | 17–19 Jun 2020 | ? | 47.6% | 48.4% | – | 4.0% | 0.8 |
| Sináptica/Público | 28 Apr–4 May 2020 | 1,000 | 51.6% | 34.6% | – | 13.8% | 17.0 |
| ElectoPanel/Electomanía | 8–12 Apr 2020 | ? | 47.0% | 47.5% | – | 5.4% | 0.5 |
| IMOP/Vanitatis | 28 May–3 Jun 2019 | 1,031 | 46.1% | 50.8% | – | 3.1% | 4.7 |
| SocioMétrica/El Español | 22 Dec–5 Jan 2019 | 2,200 | 41.9% | 43.1% | 15.0% | – | 1.2 |
| YouGov/El HuffPost | 2–5 Nov 2018 | 1,002 | 48.0% | 35.0% | – | 17.0% | 13.0 |
| ElectoPanel/Electomanía | 10 Oct 2018 | 2,075 | 45.6% | 48.1% | – | 6.3% | 2.5 |
| Podemos | Jul 2018 | 1,014 | 46.0% | 27.2% | – | 26.8% | 18.8 |
| ElectoPanel/Electomanía | 16–20 Jul 2018 | 2,850 | 47.4% | 49.9% | – | 2.7% | 2.5 |
| Ipsos | 23 Mar–6 Apr 2018 | 3,958 | 37% | 24% | 21% | 19% | 13.0 |
| NC Report/La Razón | 25 Jun 2017 | ? | 25.4% | 61.8% | – | 12.8% | 36.4 |
| SocioMétrica/El Español | 22–29 Dec 2016 | 800 | 32.5% | 60.9% | – | 6.6% | 28.4 |
| Sigma Dos/El Mundo | 9–11 Jun 2015 | 1,100 | 33.7% | 61.5% | – | 4.8% | 27.8 |
| NC Report/La Razón | 23 Jun 2014 | ? | 28.3% | 57.6% | – | 14.0% | 29.3 |
| TNS Demoscopia/Antena 3 | 7 Jun 2014 | ? | 35.5% | 60.0% | – | 4.5% | 24.5 |
| Metroscopia/El País | 4–5 Jun 2014 | 1,000 | 36% | 49% | – | 15% | 13 |
| Sigma Dos/El Mundo | 3–5 Jun 2014 | 1,000 | 35.6% | 55.7% | – | 8.6% | 20.1 |
| InvyMark/laSexta | 2 Jun 2014 | ? | 36.3% | 53.1% | – | 10.6% | 16.8 |
| InvyMark/laSexta | Jan 2014 | ? | 41% | 41% | – | 18% | Tie |
| Sigma Dos/El Mundo | 28–31 Dec 2013 | 1,000 | 43.3% | 49.9% | – | 6.8% | 6.6 |
| NC Report/La Razón | 14 Apr 2013 | ? | ? | 63.5% | – | ? | ? |
| Metroscopia | 6 Jan 2013 | ? | 37% | 53% | 5% | 5% | 16 |
| Sigma Dos/El Mundo | 21–28 Dec 2012 | 1,000 | 41.0% | 53.8% | – | 5.2% | 12.8 |
| InvyMark/laSexta | 23 Apr 2012 | ? | 34.0% | 57.9% | – | 8.1% | 23.9 |
| NC Report/La Razón | 22 Apr 2012 | ? | 35.5% | 48.5% | – | 15.9% | 13.0 |
| Sigma Dos/El Mundo | 27–29 Dec 2011 | 2,480 | 33% | 60% | – | 7% | 27 |
| Metroscopia/El País | 14–15 Dec 2011 | 1,000 | 37% | 49% | 7% | 7% | 12 |
| InvyMark/laSexta | 12 Dec 2011 | ? | 37.0% | 59.3% | – | 3.7% | 22.3 |
| InvyMark/laSexta | 20 Jun 2011 | ? | 36.8% | 42.1% | – | 21.1% | 5.3 |
| Metroscopia/El País | 14 Apr 2011 | ? | 39% | 48% | 10% | | 9 |
| Metroscopia/El País | 2–4 Nov 2010 | 1,000 | 35% | 57% | 4% | 4% | 22 |
| ASEP | 1–10 Oct 2010 | 1,100 | 25.1% | 57.1% | 6.3% | 11.5% | 32.0 |
| Metroscopia/El País | 2–3 Dec 2009 | 732 | 25% | 66% | 9% | | 41 |
| Sigma Dos/El Mundo | 15 Aug 2008 | ? | 16.2% | 22.7% (Note: Monarchist: 15.7%, Juancarlist: 7.0%) | 57.9% | – | 6.5 |
| Sigma Dos/El Mundo | 5 Jan 2008 | ? | 12.8% | 43.1% (Note: Monarchist: 28.5%, Juancarlist: (Note: Juancarlism (variously written with and without the capital "J") is the support not of the institution of the monarchy itself, but rather for the previous monarch, King Juan Carlos I. There was no consensus amongst "Juancarlists" on what to do upon Juan Carlos's abdication or death, but some Juancarlists supported the abolition of the monarchy after Juan Carlos, while others believed that the ascension of the King's heir, Prince Felipe should have been put to a plebiscite. Juan Carlos had a particularly strong following because of his work in the Spanish transition to democracy from dictatorship in the 1970s, however polls showed that this support was waning towards the end of his reign.) 14.6%) | 39.9% | – | 30.3 |
| GESOP/Tiempo | 6 Oct 2007 | ? | 24.8% | 50.6% | 24.6% | | 25.8 |
| Metroscopia/Fundación Toledo | 4–5 Oct 2007 | 600 | 22% | 69% | 5% | 4% | 47 |
| Opina/Cadena SER | 28 Sep 2006 | 1,000 | 25% | 65% | – | 10% | 40 |
| Sigma Dos/El Mundo | 20 Nov 2005 | ? | 23.5% | 38.0% | 38.5% | – | 14.5 |
| Sigma Dos/El Mundo | 20 Nov 2000 | ? | 15.9% | 43.0% | 41.1% | – | 27.1 |
| Metroscopia | 1998 | ? | 11% | 72% | 10% | 7% | 61 |
| Metroscopia | 1997 | ? | 15% | 65% | 13% | 7% | 50 |
| Metroscopia | Nov 1996 | ? | 13% | 66% | 20% | 1% | 53 |
| Opina/La Vanguardia | 30 Sep–2 Oct 1996 | 600 | 15.9% (Note: Republican: 9.7%, More republican than monarchist: 6.2%) | 46.9% (Note: Monarchist: 35.7%, More monarchist than republican: 11.2%) | 31.3% | 5.9% | 31.0 |

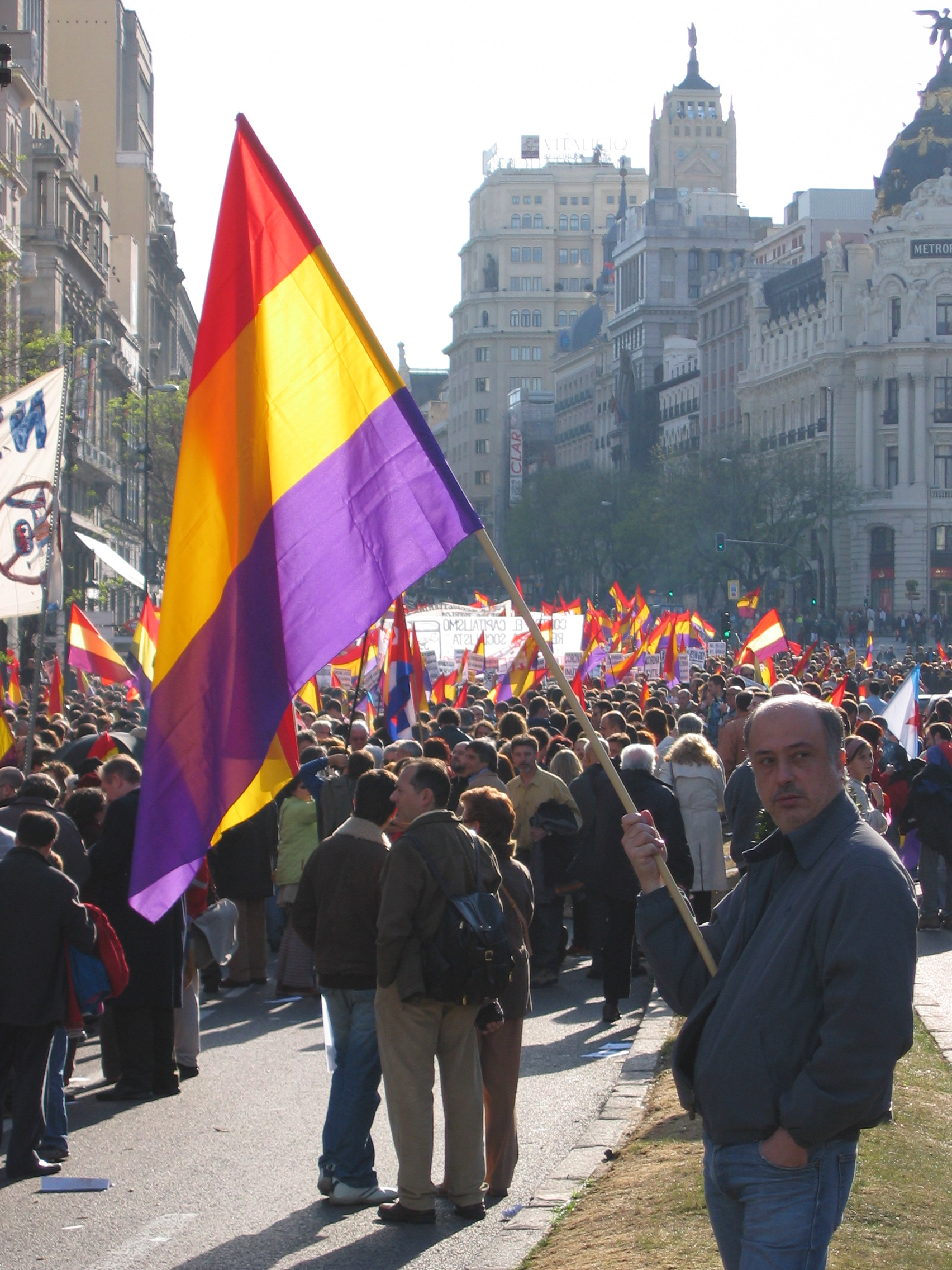
2006 demonstration in Madrid calling for the Third Spanish Republic

After 2005, surveys have measured a larger support for republicanism amongst Spanish youth, with more 18- to 29-year-olds identifying themselves as republicans than those identifying as monarchists, according to El Mundo. Despite this, some surveys show the public in favour of the monarchy, and according to an August 2008 El Mundo poll, 47.9% of Spaniards would have liked to democratically elect King Juan Carlos, and 42.3% of respondents thought that the succession of his heir Prince Felipe should be put to a plebiscite. According to the newspaper Público's "Publicscopio" section in December 2009, 61% survey respondents were in favour of amending the Spanish Constitution to allow the Spanish people to decide between a monarchy and a republic, a number that increased by 3% compared to the data collected the year before by the same newspaper. According to a 2012 survey by Gallup, 54% of Spaniards were in favor of a referendum to choose the form of government (monarchy or republic), and support was always found to be even higher when surveying younger age groups (support was 73.1% amongst 18- to 24-year-olds, but only 34.5% for those above 65 years). Support for such a referendum is also higher amongst the more educated groups of the population, voters in left-wing political parties, and between members of the upper and upper-middle classes. In 2013, as a result of the accusation of Princess Cristina in the Nóos scandal, republican support has begun to increase greater than ever before.

When Juan Carlos announced his abdication on 2 June 2014, thousands of protesters took to the squares of several Spanish towns and cities demanding a referendum on whether the monarchy should continue. Subsequent surveys showed that the abdication improved the image of the Crown thanks to a positive image of the new king, Felipe VI, but since then, support for the monarchy has dropped to a technical tie between its supporters and supporters of the republic, according to surveys in recent years, therefore becoming the European country with the highest percentage of detractors of the current monarchical state model.

== Political party positions ==
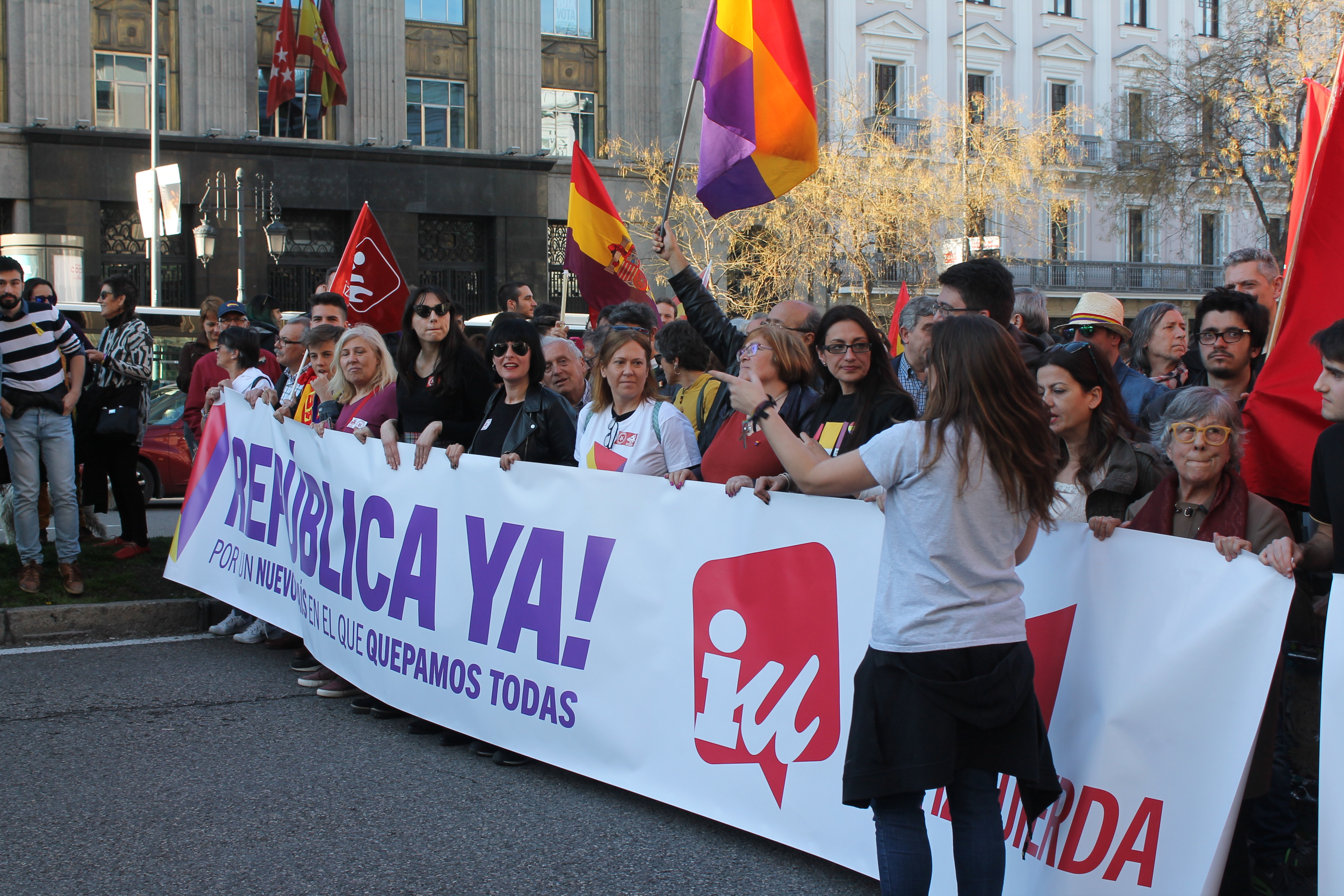
IU politicians heading a march during the 14 April 2018 republican demonstration in Madrid.

=== Pro-republican ===
- The left-wing populist Podemos advocate to establish a republic by holding a referendum on whether or not to abolish the monarchy. Former leader, Pablo Iglesias, said that he does not advocate changing to a presidential republic but maintain parliamentary democracy.
- Sumar, an electoral alliance which includes over 15 parties, such as Movimiento Sumar, IU, Equo, Más Madrid, Coalició Compromís, Catalunya en Comú, and many others, advocated that "we will work so that Felipe VI is the last monarch".
  - United Left (IU) is a federation of left-wing parties and organizations dominated by the Communist Party of Spain (PCE). The IU states its mission is "to transform gradually the capitalist economic, social, and political system into a democratic socialist system, founded on the principles of justice, social equality, solidarity, respect of nature, and organized in conformity with a federal and republican "state of rights". IU and the PCE advocate the establishment of a Third Spanish Republic.
  - Equo is a green eco-socialist party. Equo advocates for a "federal, secular, and republican state".
- Republican Left of Catalonia (ERC), Junts, CUP and Catalan Alliance all advocate to establish a Catalan republic and are strongly against the present monarchy.
- EH Bildu advocate to establish a Basque republic and is strongly against the present monarchy.
- The Galician Nationalist Bloc (BNG) is openly republican and rejects the Spanish monarchy, considering that it is neither a democratic nor representative institution. The BNG has advocated for a federal republic model that allows Galicia to exercise its right to self-determination. In the words of its national spokesperson, Ana Pontón, the monarchy is "an anachronistic institution that has no place in a democratic and plural society", labelling the Bourbons as "a criminal organization".

=== Pro-monarchy ===
- The conservative People's Party (PP) strongly supports the monarchy.
- The far-right party Vox supports the monarchy. However, its leader Santiago Abascal has defended that "Spain, its sovereignty and its unity are above the Monarchy, the Republic, the Constitution and Democracy", suggesting a conditional support to the Crown.
- The Navarrese People's Union (UPN) has traditionally shown its support for the Spanish monarchy, defending its role as guarantor of the unity and stability of the State. The party, conservative and constitutionalist in nature, considers that the monarchy is a key institution within the constitutional framework of 1978. The former president of the party, Javier Esparza, has pointed out that the monarchy "has been a fundamental pillar for democracy and the cohesion of Spain".

=== Ambiguous ===
- The Spanish Socialist Workers' Party (PSOE) is the main centre-left Spanish political party and the one that has spent the most years in government since the Transition (1982–1996, 2004–2011, 2018–present). Since the approval of the Constitution, the party maintains a position of limited intervention in debate on the monarchy, providing some support to the monarchy while many grassroot members self-identify as republican. The PSOE has praised the monarchy and its role, while its youth wing Socialist Youth of Spain (JSE) openly advocates for the establishment of a republic. In its resolutions of the 37th Congress (2004–2008), the PSOE declared itself in support of a "civic republicanism". The mentions of republicanism disappeared in the resolutions of the 38th Congress due to internal conflict over this position. Current social-democratic leader and Prime Minister, Pedro Sánchez, who identifies as republican, has asserted more than once that "The PSOE is a republican party, but constitutional" and "We Republicans feel very well represented in this parliamentary monarchy that we have". In the 39th PSOE Congress, Pedro Sánchez's team negotiated for the withdrawal of an amendment from the Socialist Youth that demanded "implanting the republic as a model of the State through a constitutional reform and the convening of a referendum". The amendment was withdrawn and the resolution finally stated that "PSOE has its own conception of the State model and the form of government towards which it wants to advance, strengthening republican values and promoting a federal model".
- The right-of-centre Citizens does not have a defined position vis-à-vis the form of government but the party has praised the monarchy and its role. Former leader, Albert Rivera, declared that he does not define himself as a monarchist.
- The Basque Nationalist Party (PNV) has maintained a critical but pragmatic stance towards the Spanish monarchy, focusing more on Basque autonomy than on the abolition of the Crown. Although the party does not declare itself openly republican, it defends a plurinational model where the Basque Country can decide its political future. Leaders such as Andoni Ortuzar, president of the PNV, have stated that the monarchy is an institution "far removed" from the democratic values defended by the party, although in institutional terms they have maintained a respectful relationship.
- Canarian Coalition (CC) adopts a neutral stance towards the Spanish monarchy, without actively positioning itself for or against its abolition. Although CC has historically defended self-government and the interests of the Canary Islands within the constitutional framework, it has shown respect for the monarchy as part of that system. In statements, CC members such as party leader Fernando Clavijo Batlle have recognized the role of the monarchy in "guaranteeing the institutional stability" of Spain, without making this issue a central axis of their political discourse.

== Constitutional procedure to establish a republic ==
Title X of the Spanish Constitution establishes that the approval of a new constitution or the approval of any constitutional amendment affecting the Preliminary Title, or Section I of Chapter II of Title I (on Fundamental Rights and Public Liberties) or Title II (on the Crown), the so-called "protected provisions", are subject to a special process that requires:

1. that two-thirds of each House approve the amendment,
2. that elections are called immediately thereafter,
3. that two-thirds of each new House approves the amendment, and
4. that the amendment is approved by the people in a referendum.

== See also ==
- History of Spain
- Politics of Spain
- Republicanism
- Spanish Monarchy
- First Spanish Republic
- Second Spanish Republic
- Spanish Civil War
- Francoist Spain
- Alliance of European Republican Movements

== Bibliography ==
- Alted Vigil, Alicia (1994). "La oposición republicana, 1939–1977". In Townson, Nigel (ed.). El republicanismo en España (1830–1977). Madrid: Alianza Editorial. ISBN 84-206-2778-X.
- Aróstegui, Julio (1997). La Guerra Civil. La ruptura democrática. Madrid: Historia 16. ISBN 84-7679-320-0.
- Avilés Farré, Juan (2006). La izquierda burguesa y la tragedia de la II República. Madrid: Comunidad de Madrid. ISBN 84-451-2895-7.
- Barón Fernández, José (1998). El movimiento cantonal de 1873. A Coruña: Edicios do Castro. ISBN 84-7492-896-6.
- Ben-Ami, Shlomo (2012) [1983]. El cirujano de hierro. La dictadura de Primo de Rivera (1923–1930). Barcelona: RBA. ISBN 978-84-9006-161-9.
- Casanova, Julián (2007). República y Guerra Civil. Historia de España, vol. 8. Barcelona and Madrid: Crítica/Marcial Pons. ISBN 978-84-8432-878-0.
- Castro Alfín, Demetrio (1994). "Orígenes y primeras etapas del republicanismo en España". In Townson, Nigel (ed.). El republicanismo en España (1830–1977). Madrid: Alianza Editorial. ISBN 84-206-2778-X.
- Dardé, Carlos (1994). "La larga noche de la Restauración, 1875–1900". In Townson, Nigel (ed.). El republicanismo en España (1830–1977). Madrid: Alianza Editorial. ISBN 84-206-2778-X.
- Duarte, Ángel (2013). El republicanismo. Una pasión política. Madrid: Cátedra. ISBN 978-84-376-3132-5.
- Fontana, Josep (2007). La época del liberalismo. Historia de España, vol. 6. Barcelona and Madrid: Crítica/Marcial Pons. ISBN 978-84-8432-876-6.
- García Queipo de Llano, Genoveva (1997). El reinado de Alfonso XIII. La modernización fallida (in Spanish). Madrid: Historia 16. ISBN 84-7679-318-9.
- Tusell, Javier; García Queipo de Llano, Genoveva (2001). Alfonso XIII. El rey polémico. Madrid: Taurus. ISBN 978-84-306-0449-4.
- Gil Pecharromán, Julio (1997). La Segunda República. Esperanzas y frustraciones. Madrid: Historia 16. ISBN 84-7679-319-7.
- González Calleja, Eduardo (2005). La España de Primo de Rivera. La modernización autoritaria 1923–1930. Madrid: Alianza Editorial. ISBN 84-206-4724-1.
- Heine, Hartmut (1983). La oposición política al franquismo. Barcelona: Crítica. ISBN 84-7423-198-1.
- Juliá, Santos (1999). Un siglo de España. Política y sociedad. Madrid: Marcial Pons. ISBN 84-95379-03-1.
- López-Cordón, María Victoria (1976). La revolución de 1868 y la I República. Madrid: Siglo XXI. ISBN 84-323-0238-4.
- Martín Ramos, José Luis (2015). El Frente Popular. Victoria y derrota de la democracia en España. Barcelona: Pasado & Presente. ISBN 978-84-942890-4-0.
- Ranzato, Gabriele (2014). El gran miedo de 1936. Cómo España se precipitó en la Guerra Civil. Madrid: La Esfera de los Libros. ISBN 978-84-9060-022-1.
- Suárez Cortina, Manuel (1994). "La quiebra del republicanismo histórico, 1898–1931". In Townson, Nigel (ed.). El republicanismo en España (1830–1977). Madrid: Alianza Editorial. ISBN 84-206-2778-X.
- Suárez Cortina, Manuel (2006). La España Liberal (1868–1917). Política y sociedad. Madrid: Síntesis. ISBN 84-9756-415-4.
- Suárez Cortina, Manuel (2023). "La Primera República: culturas políticas y proyectos de democracia". La Primera República española. 150 años después. Madrid: Centro de Estudios Políticos y Constitucionales. ISBN 978-84-259-1989-3.
- Townson, Nigel (2002). La República que no pudo ser. La política de centro en España (1931–1936). Madrid: Taurus. ISBN 84-306-0487-1.
- Vilches, Jorge (2001). Progreso y Libertad. El Partido Progresista en la Revolución Liberal Española. Madrid: Alianza Editorial. ISBN 84-206-6768-4.
- Higueras Castañeda, Eduardo (2016). "Presentación del dossier". Espacio, Tiempo y Forma. Serie V, Historia Contemporánea (28). Madrid: Universidad Nacional de Educación a Distancia: 15–22. doi:10.5944/etfv.28.2016. ISSN 1130-0124. Archived from the original on 8 December 2019.
- Penche, Jon (2011). "Republicanismo en España y Portugal (1876-1890/91): una perspectiva comparada". Revista da Faculdade de Letras. Historia. 1 (1): 155–170. ISSN 0871-164X. Archived from the original on 9 December 2019.
