= President of the Republic (Spain) =

Spanish title for the head of state during the Second Spanish Republic (1931–1939)

- Presidente de la República (Spanish)
- Presidential Monogram
- Style: His Excellency
- Type: Head of state
- Status: Abolished
- Term length: Six years, renewable non-consecutively
- Precursor: King of Spain
- Formation: 14 April 1931
- First holder: Niceto Alcalá-Zamora
- Final holder: Manuel Azaña
- Abolished: 3 March 1939
- Superseded by: Francoist dictatorship
- Deputy: President of the Cortes republicanas

President of the Republic (Spanish: Presidente de la República) was the title of the head of state during the Second Spanish Republic (1931–1939). The office was based on the model of the Weimar Republic, then still in power in Germany, and a compromise between the French and American presidential systems. The "Republican Revolutionary Committee" set up by the Pact of San Sebastián (1930), considered the "central event in the opposition to the monarchy of Alfonso XIII", and headed by Niceto Alcalá-Zamora, eventually became the first provisional government of the Second Republic, with Alcalá-Zamora named President of the Republic on 11 December 1931.

Spain is one of the democracies (see President of the Government for the full list of countries) where the term "president" does not solely refer to the head of state but to several distinct offices: President of the Republic for some historical heads of state; President of the Government for the head of the executive; President of the Senate for the speaker of the upper parliamentary chamber, and so on. This has led to some confusion in countries where the term "president" refers solely to the head of state, such as the United States; several incidents involved high-profile American politicians calling the Spanish head of government "President", including George W. Bush in 2001, Jeb Bush in 2003, and Donald Trump in September 2017. With Spain a constitutional monarchy since 1975, the monarch is head of state.

== First Spanish Republic (1873–74) ==
Following the abdication of Amadeo I on 10 February 1873, the short-lived First Republic (1873–74) had four heads of state (officially, Presidents of the Executive Power): Estanislao Figueras, Pi i Margall, Nicolás Salmerón, and Emilio Castelar. On the eve of the pronunciamiento of 3 January 1874, General Pavia sent for Francisco Serrano y Domínguez take to the leadership. Serrano took the title of president of the executive and he continued at the end of December 1874 when the Bourbons were restored by another pronunciamiento.

=== Presidents of the Executive Power of the First Republic ===
No.	Portrait	Name (born–died)	Term of office			Political party	Ref.
No.	Portrait	Name (born–died)	Took office	Left office	Time in office	Political party	Ref.
1		Estanislao Figueras (1819–1882)	12 February 1873	11 June 1873	119 days	Federal Democratic Republican Party	
2		Francesc Pi i Margall (1824–1901)	11 June 1873	18 July 1873	37 days	Federal Democratic Republican Party	
3		Nicolás Salmerón (1838–1908)	18 July 1873	7 September 1873	51 days	Progressive Party	
4		Emilio Castelar (1832–1899)	7 September 1873	3 January 1874 (deposed)	118 days	Republican Possibilist Party	
5		Francisco Serrano y Domínguez (1810–1885)	3 January 1874	30 December 1874	361 days	Constitutional Party	

== Second Spanish Republic (1931–1939) ==
Following the abdication of Alfonso XIII on 14 April 1931, there was no official head of state, meaning that the Prime Minister was, in effect, the highest office in the land. Niceto Alcalá-Zamora assumed the new role of President of the Republic, the effective head of state, after the approval of the new Constitution in December 1931. Manuel Azaña remained as Prime Minister, head of the government, until 12 September 1933.

=== Presidents (Prime Ministers) of the Provisional Government of the Republic ===
No.	Portrait	Name (born–died)	Term of office			Political party	Ref.
No.	Portrait	Name (born–died)	Took office	Left office	Time in office	Political party	Ref.
1		Niceto Alcalá-Zamora (1877–1949)	14 April 1931	14 October 1931	183 days	Liberal Republican Right	
2		Manuel Azaña (1880–1940)	14 October 1931	11 December 1931	58 days	Republican Action	

=== Presidents of the Republic ===
No.	Portrait	Name (born–died)	Term of office			Political party	Ref.
No.	Portrait	Name (born–died)	Took office	Left office	Time in office	Political party	Ref.
1		Niceto Alcalá-Zamora (1877–1949)	11 December 1931	7 April 1936	4 years, 118 days	Liberal Republican Right	
–		Diego Martínez Barrio (1883–1962) acting	7 April 1936	11 May 1936	34 days	Republican Union (Popular Front)	
2		Manuel Azaña (1880–1940)	11 May 1936	3 March 1939	2 years, 296 days	Republican Left (Popular Front)	

With Franco's victory imminent, a National Council of Defense was established to negotiate a peace settlement with the Nationalists. By this point, Franco effectively had military control of the whole country.

=== Presidents of the National Council of Defense (Republican Zone) ===
No.	Portrait	Name (born–died)	Term of office			Political party	Ref.
No.	Portrait	Name (born–died)	Took office	Left office	Time in office	Political party	Ref.
–		Segismundo Casado (1893–1968) acting	4 March 1939	13 March 1939	9 days	Military	
1		José Miaja (1878–1958)	13 March 1939	27 March 1939	14 days	Military	

=== Fall of the Republic ===
On 27 February 1939, after both France and the United Kingdom had recognised Franco's military victory, President Manuel Azaña, exiled in France, resigned. The following week, the so-called Casado Coup against Prime Minister Negrín's government led to the creation of the National Defence Council which attempted, unsuccessfully to negotiate terms, with Franco breaking off talks motu proprio. Following Franco's final offensive at the end of March 1939, the Republic fell.

== Presidents of the Spanish Republic in exile (1939–1977) ==
No.	Portrait	Name (born–died)	Term of office			Political party	Ref.
No.	Portrait	Name (born–died)	Took office	Left office	Time in office	Political party	Ref.
–		Diego Martínez Barrio (1883–1962) acting	4 March 1939	11 May 1940	1 year, 68 days	Republican Union (Popular Front)	
–		Álvaro de Albornoz (1879–1954) acting	11 May 1940	17 August 1945	5 years, 98 days	Independent	
1		Diego Martínez Barrio (1883–1962)	17 August 1945	1 January 1962 †	16 years, 137 days	Republican Union (Popular Front)	
2		Luis Jiménez de Asúa (1889–1970)	11 February 1962	16 November 1970 †	8 years, 319 days	Spanish Socialist Workers' Party (Popular Front)	
3		José Maldonado González (1900–1985)	16 November 1970	1 July 1977	6 years, 227 days	Republican Left (Popular Front)	

== See also ==
- List of Spanish monarchs
- List of Spanish regents
- List of heads of state of Spain
