= President of Spain =

President of Spain may refer to:

- President of the Republic (Spain), a historical title of the head of state during the Second Spanish Republic (1931–1939)
- Prime Minister of Spain, current role, officially president of the Government
