= Claudio Sánchez-Albornoz =

Spanish scholar (1893–1984)

Excelentísimo Señor Don Claudio Sánchez-Albornoz OCIII OAXS
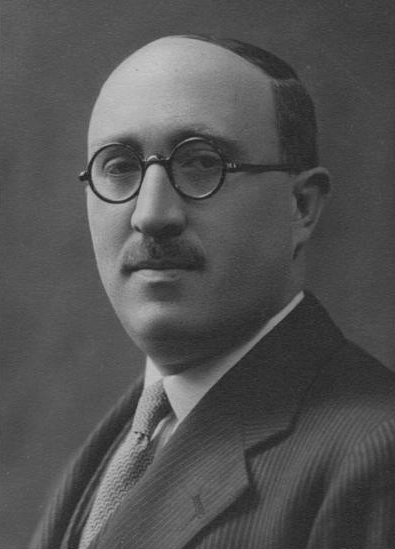

Prime Minister of the Government of the Spanish Republic in exile
- In office 28 February 1962 – 28 February 1971
- President: Luis Jiménez de Asúa
- Preceded by: Emilio Herrera Linares
- Succeeded by: Fernando Valera Aparicio

Minister of State
- In office 12 September 1933 – 16 December 1933
- President: Niceto Alcalá-Zamora
- Prime Minister: Alejandro Lerroux; Diego Martínez Barrio
- Preceded by: Fernando de los Ríos
- Succeeded by: Leandro Pita

Ambassador of Spain to Portugal
- In office 9 April 1936 – 1 December 1936
- President: Manuel Azaña
- Prime Minister: List: Manuel Azaña; Augusto Barcía Trelles; Santiago Casares Quiroga; Diego Martínez Barrio; José Giral; Francisco Largo Caballero
- Preceded by: José Juncal Verdulla
- Succeeded by: Nicolás Franco

Personal details
- Born: Claudio Sánchez-Albornoz y Menduiña; 7 April 1893 Madrid, Spain
- Died: 8 July 1984 (aged 91) Ávila, Spain
- Resting place: Ávila Cathedral
- Party: Republican Union; Republican Left
- Children: Nicolás Sánchez-Albornoz
- Awards: Civil Order of Alfonso X, the Wise (1979); Grand Cross of the Order of Charles III (1983); Princess of Asturias Award for Communication and Humanities (1984)

Academic background
- Education: Central University of Madrid

Academic work
- Institutions: List: Central University of Madrid; Real Academia de la Historia; National University of Cuyo; University of Buenos Aires; University of Valladolid; University of Valencia; University of Barcelona
- Main interests: History

Claudio Sánchez-Albornoz y Menduiña (Spanish pronunciation: [ˈklawðjo ˈsantʃeθ alβoɾˈnoθ]; April 7, 1893, in Madrid – July 8, 1984, in Ávila) was a Spanish scholar, politician and orator. He served as Prime Minister of the Spanish Republican government in exile during the dictatorship of Francisco Franco.

== Early life and career ==
Sánchez-Albornoz was born in Madrid to a prominent political family from the provincial capital of Ávila and attended the Central University of Madrid, where he obtained a licentiate degree in letters and philosophy in 1913 with first-class honours. One year later, at age 21, he was awarded a doctorate degree in history with the thesis "La Monarquía en Asturias, León y Castilla durante los siglos VIII al XIII. La Potestad Real y los Señoríos". He quickly established himself as the country's preeminent young scholar of medieval Spanish history, particularly the history of the monarchy and royal institutions in the early Middle Ages.

By 1920, Sánchez-Albornoz had already held several prestigious university chairs when he was offered the chair in Spanish medieval history at Madrid held by his late thesis adviser, Eduardo de Hinojosa. In 1926, he was inducted into the Real Academia de la Historia, the youngest member to have ever been admitted to the elite scholarly institution. By 1931, he was appointed Dean of the Faculty of Philosophy and Letters and served as rector of the Central University the following year. During that time, he took a hiatus from his academic pursuits to join the newly-established republican government and served in the Spanish Cortes as a representative from Ávila and later in several other prominent posts, including Minister of Education.

== Exile and later career ==
During the early years of the Spanish Civil War, Sánchez-Albornoz was appointed the Spanish Republic ambassador to Portugal. When the government in Lisbon declared its support for Francisco Franco, he was dismissed from his post. He fled with his family to France and in 1940 to Argentina, where he would spend more than four decades in exile as both a scholar and leader of the democratic anti-Franco movement abroad.

After a brief post at the University of Cuyo, in the northern province of Mendoza, Sánchez-Albornoz was offered a position at the University of Buenos Aires, where he created a centre for Iberian medieval studies and founded a historical journal, the Cuadernos de historia de España. During these years, he remained a tremendously productive scholar, wrote extensively on early Spanish history and trained young Argentine and other Latin American scholars to work on medieval documents and legal texts.

For Sánchez-Albornoz, the work of recovering the roots of the Spanish character and its political institutions in the Middle Ages was an extension of his political commitments to the republican Spanish state that he had helped in the 1930s.

Between 1962 and 1970, Sánchez-Albornoz served as president of the council of the Spanish Republican government in exile and used his reputation and numerous invitations to speak abroad as a platform to promote the restoration of democracy in Spain.

Even when Franco extended an amnesty to regime critics in 1969, Sánchez-Albornoz refused to return until the dictator had died.

Sánchez-Albornoz's scholarship came to focus on the Kingdoms of Castile and León and the evolution of social and economic institutions under the influence of external pressures, whether Germanic (Visigothic) or Muslim/Arab. In his monumental three-volume history of early feudalism, which he had begun to compose in France before the outbreak of war, En torno a los origines del feudalismo (1942), Sánchez-Albornoz emphasized the contributions of Visigothic culture and legal institutions to early Spanish history, particularly the monarchy and its relationship to the nobility and other segments of society. He also emphasised the emergence in Spain of a free peasantry in advancing the frontier regions during the Reconquista that complicated the development of serfdom and hierarchical structures of lordship that historians described elsewhere in feudal Europe. While an earlier generation of scholars had also tended to focus on questions about the continuity of Roman influences in medieval Iberia, Sánchez-Albornoz instead argued that the Visigothic invasions of the 5th century had created a new uniquely-Hispanic, civilisation, which defined Spanish history and the Spanish people from that point forward, even during the centuries of Arab occupation.

== Dispute with Américo Castro ==
This conviction about the origins of a unique Spanish national identity led to a notable academic feud with another scholar in exile, Américo Castro, who had moved to the United States and taught at Princeton University. Castro's ground-breaking book, España en su historia (1948; Engl. trans. 1954) posited that "Spanish" culture was essentially a hybrid one and had been produced over the course of centuries by the intermixing of Christian, Muslim and Jewish populations and traditions. Castro coined the term "convivencia", loosely translated as "living-together-ness" or "cohabitation", to describe the multicultural, religiously-tolerant and dynamic society of medieval Spain.

Sánchez-Albornoz, who regarded Castro's interdisciplinary, literature-focused methodology as insufficiently rigorous and scholarly, responded with a new study, España: un enigma histórico (1956), which argued for the persistence of a pre-Arab Spanish culture and national identity, which were grounded in the reproduction of key legal, political and economic institutions. He did not deny that Muslims and Jews were important presences in medieval Iberia, Sánchez-Albornoz maintained that they contributed little creative energy to the processes of history or state-building and insisted upon an enduring idea of Spanish nationhood and identity, which transcended the vagaries of history and the temporary influence of outside groups.

Few academic historians today still subscribe to Sanchez-Albornoz's ideas about an essential national Spanish "character" that motivates history, but there is still a lively scholarly debate over convivencia as a historical model for understanding medieval Spain.

== Later life ==
In April 1976, six months after the death of Franco, Sánchez-Albornoz returned to his homeland for the first time in more than 40 years and was given a hero's welcome, particularly in his family town of Ávila. On 2 March 1983, he received the Gran Cruz de la Real y Muy Distinguida Orden de Carlos III. He returned to Buenos Aires after a brief stay, but moved back to Ávila permanently in July 1983.

He died one year later, on 8 July 1984, at the age of 91 at Hospital de la Seguridad Social Nuestra Señora de Sonsoles, in Ávila, and was buried in the Cathedral of Ávila. A month earlier, he had received the Premio Príncipe de Asturias de Comunicación y Humanidades.

== Legacy ==
The Fundación D. Claudio Sánchez-Albornoz , in Ávila, was established shortly after his death to preserve and promote his scholarly legacy.

During his long and distinguished career, Sánchez-Albornoz received dozens of awards and honorary degrees from institutions and nations around the world and was a member or corresponding member of numerous scholarly academies.

Sánchez-Albornoz was survived by two daughters and a son, Nicolás (born 1926), who went on to become a noted scholar of Latin American demographic history and the author of La población de América Latina (1973, trans 1974, frequently republished).
