= Nicolás Salmerón =

Spanish politician (1838–1908)

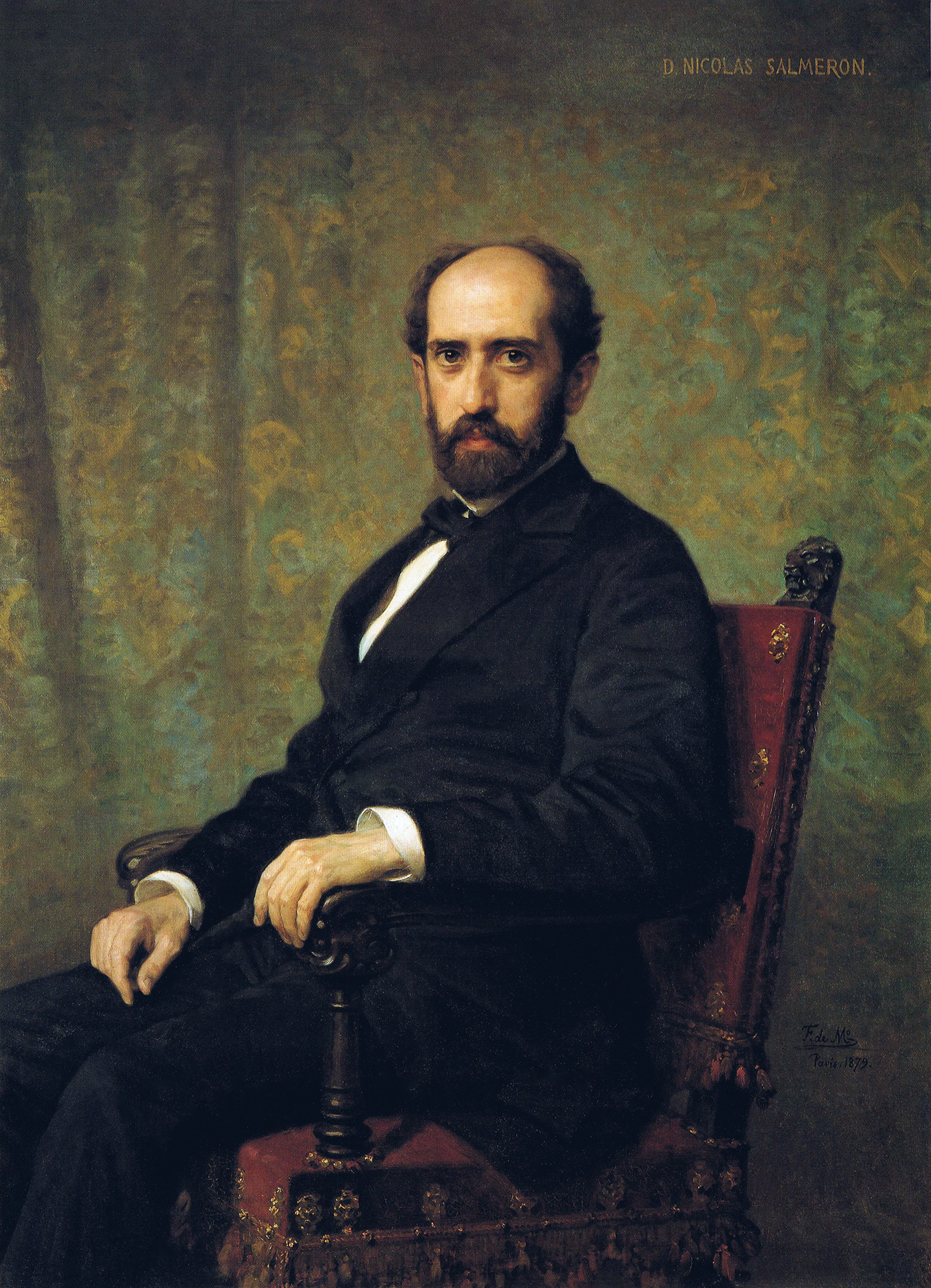
- Portrait by Federico de Madrazo

President of the Executive Power of the Republic
- In office 18 July 1873 – 7 September 1873
- Preceded by: Francisco Pi y Margall
- Succeeded by: Emilio Castelar y Ripoll

Personal details
- Born: 10 April 1838 Alhama de Almería, Province of Almería, Spain
- Died: 21 September 1908 (aged 70) Pau, France
- Party: Democratic; Republican Union; Progressive Party

Nicolás Salmerón Alonso (10 April 1838 – 21 September 1908) was a Spanish politician and president of the First Spanish Republic.

== Biography ==
He was born at Alhama la Seca in the province of Almería, was educated at Granada and became assistant professor of literature and philosophy at Madrid. The last years of the reign of Isabella II were times of growing discontent with her government and with the monarchy. Salmerón joined a small party who advocated for the establishment of a republic. He was director of the opposition paper La Discusión, and co-operated with Emilio Castelar on La Democracia. In 1865 he was named one of the members of the directing committee of the Republican Party. In 1867 he was imprisoned with other suspects.

When the revolution of September 1868 broke out, he was at Almería recovering from a serious illness. Salmerón was elected to the Cortes in 1871, and though he did not belong to the Socialist Party, defended its right to toleration. When Amadeo of Savoy resigned the Spanish crown on 11 February 1873 Salmerón was naturally marked out to be a leader of the party which endeavoured to establish a republic in Spain. While serving as minister of justice in the Figueras cabinet, he abolished the death penalty. He was subsequently elected president of the Cortes, and then, on 18 July 1873, president of the Executive Power of the Republic, in succession to Francisco Pi y Margall. He became president at a time when the Federalist Party had thrown all the south of Spain into anarchy.

Salmerón was compelled to use the troops to restore order. When, however, he found that the generals insisted on executing rebels taken in arms, he resigned (September 6) on the ground that he was opposed to capital punishment. He was again elected president of the Cortes on September 9. His successor, Castelar, was compelled to restore order by drastic means. Salmerón took part in the attack made on him in the Cortes on 3 January 1874, which provoked the generals into closing the chamber and establishing a provisional military government. Salmerón went into exile and remained abroad until 1881, when he was recalled by Sagasta.

In 1886, he was elected to the Cortes as Progressive deputy for Madrid, and unsuccessfully endeavoured to combine the jarring republican factions into a party of practical moderate views. In 1889, he was the attorney for the defense in the trial for the crime of Fuencarral street in Madrid. On 18 April 1907 he was shot at, but not wounded, in the streets of Barcelona by a member of the more extreme Republican Party. He died at Pau on 21 September 1908 at the age of 70.

He was the last living president of the First Spanish Republic.

== Human rights prize in his name ==
Since 2009 the Nicolás Salmerón Human Rights Prize has been awarded, arising from the initiative of the Ateneo de Madrid. The award is organized by the International Foundation for Human Rights and delivered at the Ateneo headquarters every December 10 on the anniversary of the approval by the United Nations of the Universal Declaration of Human Rights. Among the winners in the different categories are Luiz Inácio Lula da Silva (2020), José Luis Rodríguez Zapatero (2009), la Casa Sefarad-Israel (2010), Cristina Fernández de Kirchner (2011), El Intermedio y El Gran Wyoming (2012), Jesús Caldera (2012), Jordi Évole (2013), Pedro González Zerolo y Marcos Ana (2014).

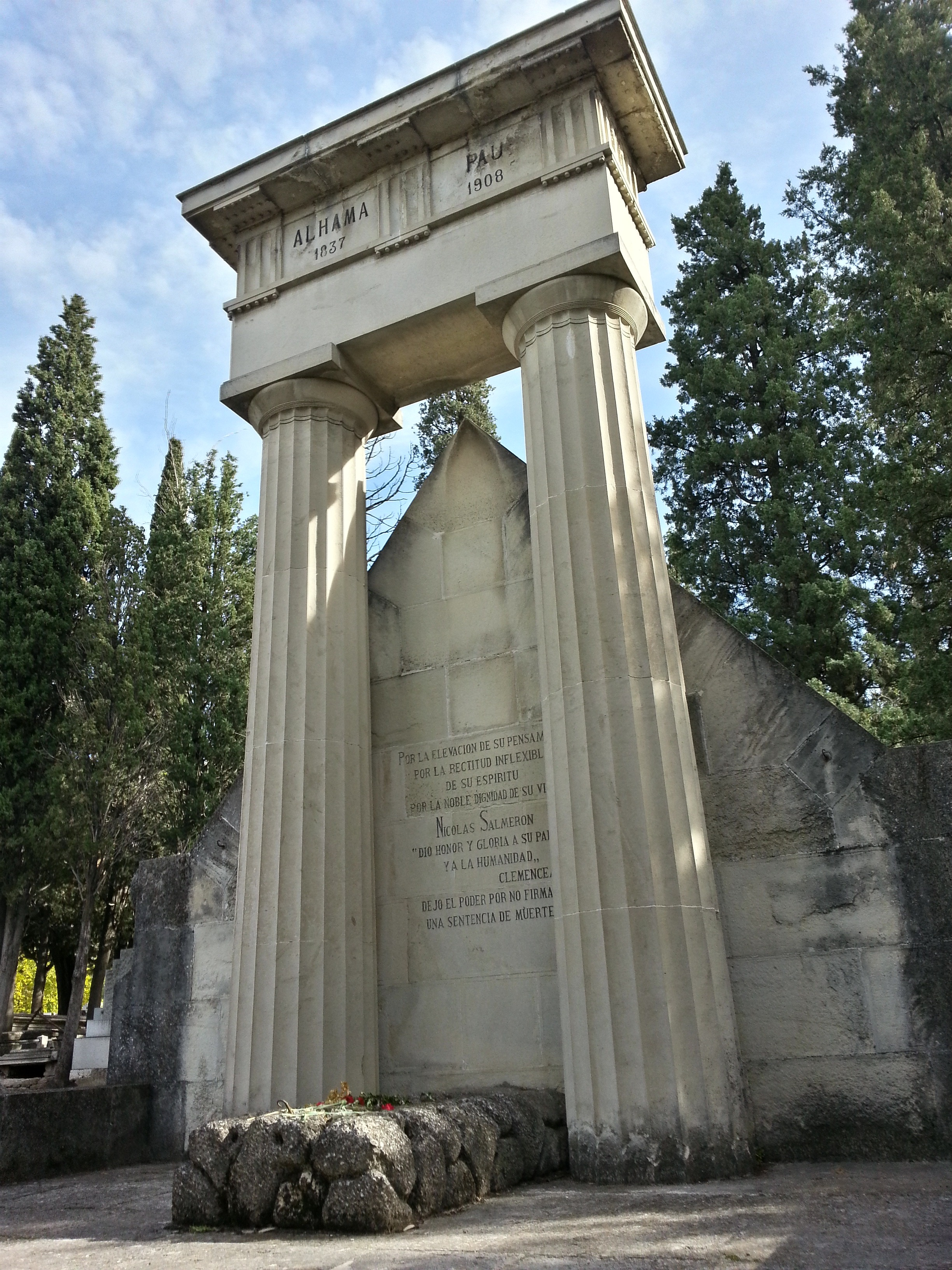
Pantheon of Nicolás Salmerón

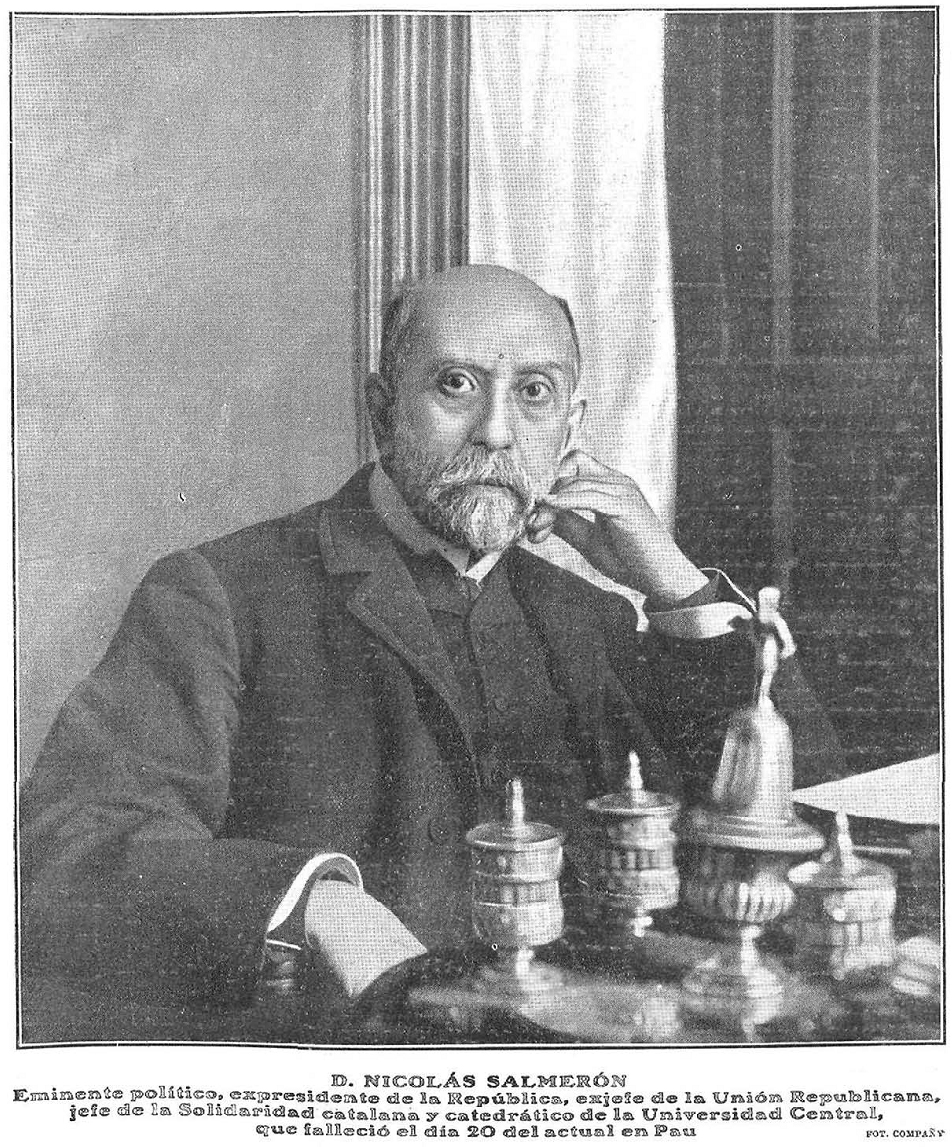
Nicolás Salmerón, c. 1900–1908

Political offices
Preceded by Francisco Pi	President of the Executive Power of Spain; 18 July 1873 – 7 September 1873	Succeeded by Emilio Castelar
Preceded by Francisco Pi	President of the Provisional Government of Spain; 18 July 1873 – 7 September 1873	Succeeded by Emilio Castelar
