= Spanish Republican government in exile =

Government of Spain in exile from 1939 to 1977

Government of the Spanish Republic in exile Gobierno de la República Española en el exilio (Spanish)
- 1939–1977
- Flag Coat of arms
- Motto: Plus Ultra "Further Beyond"
- Anthem: Himno de Riego; Anthem of Riego
- Status: Government in exile
- Capital: Madrid
- Capital-in-exile: Paris (1939–1940; 1946–1977); Mexico City (1940–1946)
- Common languages: Spanish
- President
  - 1939–1940 (first): Diego Martínez Barrio
  - 1970–1977 (last): José Maldonado González
- Prime Minister
  - 1939–1945 (first): Juan Negrín
  - 1971–1977 (last): Fernando Valera Aparicio
- Historical era: Interwar period; Cold War
  - Established: 4 April 1939
  - Disestablished: 1 July 1977
Preceded by	Succeeded by
Second Spanish Republic	Spanish transition to democracy
- Today part of: Spain

The Government of the Spanish Republic in exile (Spanish: Gobierno de la República Española en el exilio) was a continuation, in exile, of the government of the Second Spanish Republic following the victory of Francisco Franco's forces in the Spanish Civil War. It existed until the restoration of parliamentary democracy in 1977.

== History ==
Following the fall of the Republic in April 1939, the president of Spain, Manuel Azaña and the prime minister, Juan Negrín, went into exile in France. Azaña resigned his post and died in November 1940. He was succeeded as president by Diego Martínez Barrio, who had been prime minister in 1936. Following the German occupation of France in 1940, the government was reconstituted in Mexico, which under the left-wing president Lázaro Cárdenas continued to recognise the Republic, although Negrín spent the World War II years in London. Negrín resigned as prime minister in 1945 and was succeeded by José Giral.

Until 1945, the exiled Republicans had high hopes that at the end of World War II in Europe, Franco's regime would be removed from power by the victorious Allies and that they would be able to return to Spain. Furthermore, the newly-established United Nations would pass a resolution condemning the Francoist regime and the exiled Republicans initially worked with the Allies. When these hopes were disappointed, the government-in-exile faded away to a purely symbolic role. The government moved back to Paris in 1946. There was also a Basque government-in-exile and a Catalan government-in-exile.

In the immediate postwar period, it had diplomatic relations with Mexico, Panama, Guatemala, Venezuela, Poland, Czechoslovakia, Hungary, Yugoslavia, Romania, and Albania, but the United States, the United Kingdom, France and the Soviet Union did not recognise it.

Following Franco's death in 1975, King Juan Carlos initiated a transition to democracy. In 1977, the exiled Republicans accepted the re-establishment of the monarchy and recognised Juan Carlos's government as the legitimate government of Spain. The key moment came when socialist leaders Felipe González and Javier Solana met Juan Carlos at Zarzuela Palace in Madrid — a tacit endorsement of the monarchy by the previously staunchly republican Socialists.

On 1 July 1977, the Government of the Spanish Republic was formally dissolved. In a gesture of reconciliation, Juan Carlos received the exiled leaders at a ceremony in Madrid.

== Presidents in exile ==
#	Portrait	Name	President From	President Until	Political Party
		Diego Martínez Barrio; Interim	3 March 1939	11 May 1940	Republican Union
		Álvaro de Albornoz y Liminiana; Interim	11 May 1940	17 August 1945	Independent
1		Diego Martínez Barrio	17 August 1945	1 January 1962	Republican Union
2		Luis Jiménez de Asúa	1 January 1962	16 November 1970	Spanish Socialist Workers' Party
3		José Maldonado González	16 November 1970	1 July 1977	Republican Left

== Prime Ministers in exile ==
Portrait	Name (Birth–Death)	Term of office			Political Party	President (Term)
Portrait	Name (Birth–Death)	Took office	Left office	Days	Political Party	President (Term)
	Juan Negrín (1892–1956)	31 March 1939	17 August 1945	2331	Spanish Socialist Workers' Party	Álvaro de Albornoz (1939–1945)
	José Giral (1879–1962)	17 August 1945	9 February 1947	541	Republican Left	Diego Martínez Barrio (1945–1962)
	Rodolfo Llopis (1895–1983)	9 February 1947	8 August 1947	180	Spanish Socialist Workers' Party	Diego Martínez Barrio (1945–1962)
	Álvaro de Albornoz (1879–1954)	8 August 1947	13 August 1951	1558	Republican Union	Diego Martínez Barrio (1945–1962)
	Félix Gordón Ordás (1885–1973)	13 August 1951	17 April 1960	3170	Republican Union	Diego Martínez Barrio (1945–1962)
	Emilio Herrera (1879–1967)	17 April 1960	28 February 1962	682	Independent	Diego Martínez Barrio (1945–1962)
	Claudio Sánchez-Albornoz (1893–1984)	28 February 1962	28 February 1971	3287	Republican Union	Luis Jiménez de Asúa (1962–1970)
	Fernando Valera Aparicio (1899–1982)	28 February 1971	21 June 1977	2305	Republican Union	José Maldonado González (1970–1977)

== See also ==
- Spanish Maquis
- Republicanism in Spain
- Government-in-exile of José Giral
- Dates of establishment of diplomatic relations with Francoist Spain
- Spanish Republican exiles
