= Francesc Pi i Margall =

Spanish politician (1824–1901)

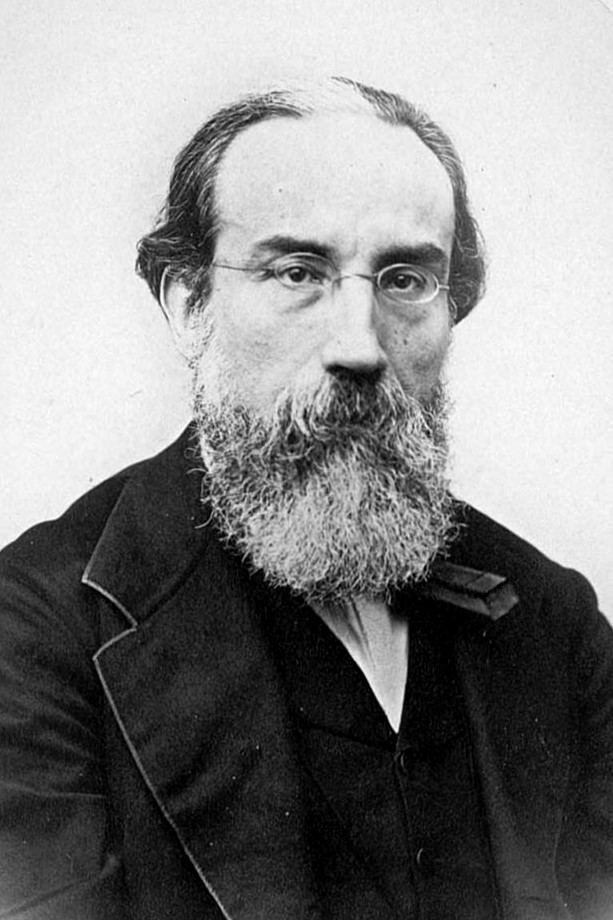
- Pi in 1869

President of the Executive Power of the Republic
- In office 11 June 1873 – 18 July 1873
- Preceded by: Estanislao Figueras
- Succeeded by: Nicolás Salmerón

Personal details
- Born: 29 April 1824 Barcelona, Spain
- Died: 29 November 1901 (aged 77) Madrid, Spain
- Party: Democratic; Federal Democratic Republican
- Spouse: Petra Arsuaga
- Children: 3, including Francisco and Joaquín
- Parents: Francesc Pi (father); Teresa Margall (mother)
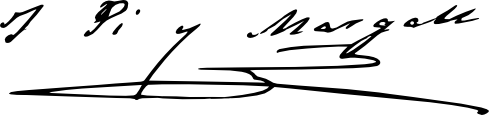
- Signature

Francesc Pi i Margall (Spanish: Francisco Pi y Margall; 29 April 1824 – 29 November 1901) was a Spanish federalist and republican politician and theorist who served as president of the short-lived First Spanish Republic in 1873. He was also a historian, philosopher, romanticist writer, and was also the leader of the Federal Democratic Republican Party and the Democratic Party. Pi was turned into a sort of secular saint in his time.

A disciple of Pierre-Joseph Proudhon, his theoretical contributions left a lasting effect on the development of the anarchist movement in Spain.

== Early life ==
Pi was the son of a working-class textile worker in Barcelona, Catalonia, and was born on 29 April 1824. Pi's father enrolled him in a religious school in 1831 where Pi acquired an education in the humanities and the classics. He was a member of the Societat Filomàtica, enabling him to meet some of the main thinkers and writers of the Catalan romanticist movement. In 1837, he left to study law, earning a licentiate degree in 1847. He moved to Madrid that year and began writing as a theater critic for the journal El Renacimiento and for El Correo, in which Pi's first political article was published. In need of further income, Pi also took a job for Martí, a Catalan bank.

== Political life under the monarchy ==
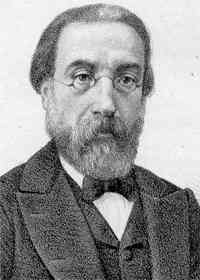
Francesc Pi i Margall

Pi was involved in the revolution of 1854 that brought the liberal espadón Baldomero Espartero back to power. He published La reacción y la revolución in that year, influenced by G.W.F. Hegel's philosophy of history and the thinking of the French anarchist Pierre-Joseph Proudhon. In 1856 he established a new journal, La Razón, that was closed when the government of Leopoldo O'Donnell was overthrown by Ramón María Narváez. Pi fled to Guipúzcoa in the Basque country until 1857, when Nicolás María Rivero asked him to return to Madrid to contribute to the Republican newspaper La Discusión. At La Discusión, Pi became acquainted with a number of leaders of the Spanish republican movement, including another future president of the First Republic, Estanislao Figueras. In 1864 he became the director of the newspaper.

After the sergeants' revolt at San Gil in 1866, Pi fled to Paris, where he gave lectures and translated several of Proudhon's works and became familiar with French positivism. He developed ideas about revolutions and the philosophy of history, including a belief in an inevitable, progressive, and permanent movement in history toward greater freedom, embodied in federal constitutions. Throughout his life he would promote republicanism and social objectives through the federal idea.

Pi returned from Paris after the success of the 1868 Glorious Revolution. He was elected deputy on behalf of Barcelona and was part of the Constituent Cortes that wrote the 1869 Constitution. During this time Pi became respected as a leader of the Republican party in the Cortes; he is officially named the head of the party in March 1870. He was replaced shortly thereafter by internal strife over the party's policy toward the Paris Commune, conciliatory policy toward opposition groups, and electoral setbacks. He continued to adamantly promote the establishment of a federal republic in place of a monarchy. He opposed the monarchy of Amadeo I during its short rule.

== Presidency and later political life ==
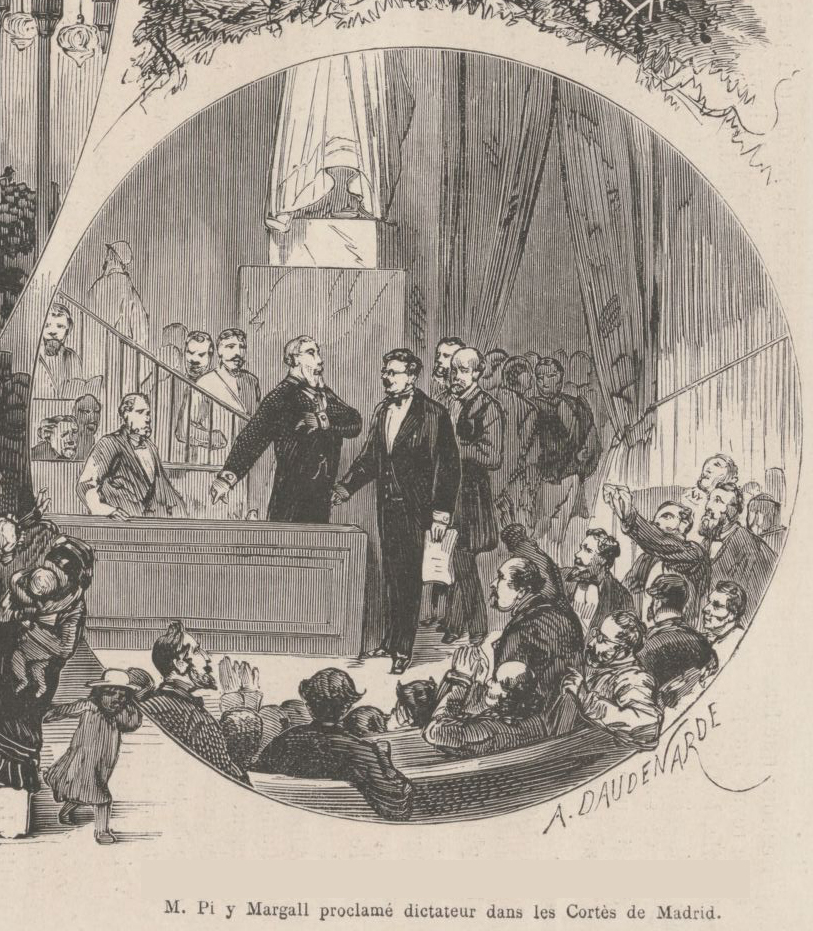
Pi proclaimed president. Drawing by Daniel Vierge. Engraving by Amédée Daudenarde.

When the First Spanish Republic was established in 1873 after the abdication of Amadeo I, the first president, Estanislao Figueras, appointed Pi as Minister of the Interior. During his ministerial tenure, Pi was responsible for the struggle against the cantonalist movement in the provinces. On Figueras's resignation on 11 June, Pi was named president. Pi presented to the Cortes an ambitious plan of reform, including a law formalizing a stricter separation of church and state, the reorganization of the army, reduction of the working day to eight hours, regulation of child labor, enhancements to the relationship between business and labor, new laws regarding the autonomy of the regions of Spain, and a program of universal education. His acquaintance with Proudhon enabled Pi to warm relations between the Republicans and the socialists in Spain. However, Pi was unable to rein in the instability of the Republic; on 1 July, the more radical elements of the Republican party and federalists broke off and declared the government illegitimate, and new insurrections appeared in Alcoy and Cartagena only a week later. Under pressure from the Cortes and many leading Republicans who accused him of dangerous weakness, Pi resigned the presidency on 18 July, only a little more than a month after he assumed the office.

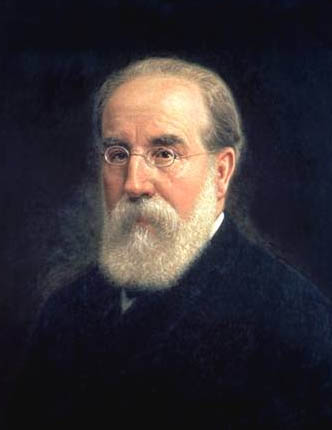
Portrait of Pi by José Sánchez Pescador

After the end of the Republic in 1874, Pi left political life for a decade. During this time, he returned his attentions to his writings; only a few months after the end of the Republic, he wrote a treatise on its events, La República de 1873. He followed this with Las Nacionalidades and Joyas Literarias in 1876. The first volume of his Historia General de América was published in 1878, La Federación in 1880, and Las luchas de nuestros días and Observaciones sobre el carácter de don Juan Tenorio in 1884. In 1886, he returned to politics and was elected deputy for Figueres, in Catalonia, and again in 1891 and 1893. He was involved in the fragmentation of the Spanish Republican movement in this period together with Estanislao Figueras, Manuel Ruiz Zorrilla, Emilio Castelar y Ripoll, and Valentí Almirall. Pi was involved in the 1883 Republican Congress of Zaragoza that proposed a federal republican constitution for Spain; in 1894, he was instrumental in reforming the republican movement with a new manifesto for the Federal Party. In 1890, Pi founded the newspaper El Nuevo Régimen, which campaigned for Cuban independence. Pi's promotion of federalism and regional autonomy earned him popularity among Catalan anarchists.

Pi died on 29 November 1901 around 18:15 at his home in the calle del Conde de Aranda, in Madrid.

== Political thought, practice and later influence ==
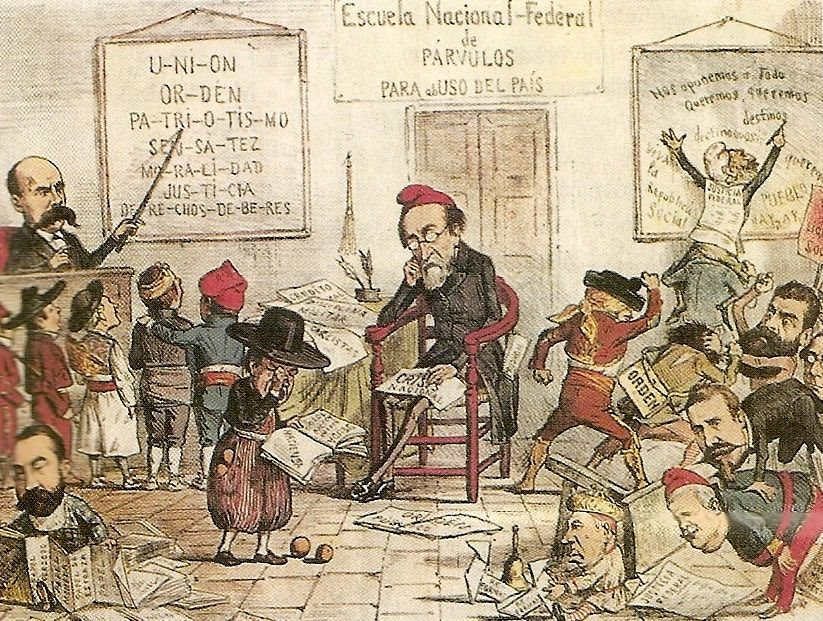
Cartoon depicting political figures of the First Spanish Republic, featuring Pi in the middle sporting a phrygian cap.

Pi i Margall became the principal translator of Proudhon's works into Spanish and later briefly became president of Spain in 1873 while being the leader of the Democratic Republican Federal Party. According to George Woodcock, "These translations were to have a profound and lasting effect on the development of Spanish anarchism after 1870, but before that time Proudhonian ideas, as interpreted by Pi, already provided much of the inspiration for the federalist movement which sprang up in the early 1860s." According to the Encyclopædia Britannica "During the Spanish revolution of 1873, Pi i Margall attempted to establish a decentralized, or "cantonalist", political system on Proudhonian lines."

Pi considered federalism to be a "unity in variety, the law of nature, the law of the world", an organization based on the bottom-up contract by "natural and spontaneous collective beings" (La reacción y la revolución, 1854).

Pi i Margall was a dedicated theorist in his own right, especially through book-length works such as La reacción y la revolución (English: "Reaction and revolution" from 1855), Las nacionalidades (English: "Nationalities" from 1877), and La Federación from 1880. For prominent anarcho-syndicalist Rudolf Rocker "The first movement of the Spanish workers was strongly influenced by the ideas of Pi i Margall, leader of the Spanish Federalists and disciple of Proudhon. Pi i Margall was one of the outstanding theorists of his time and had a powerful influence on the development of libertarian ideas in Spain. His political ideas had much in common with those of Richard Price, Joseph Priestly (sic), Thomas Paine, Thomas Jefferson, and other representatives of the Anglo-American liberalism of the first period. He wanted to limit the power of the state to a minimum and gradually replace it by a Socialist economic order."

He was also a supporter of a decentralized version of Iberian Federalism, framing the realization of such prospect in terms of "Iberian nations". He was wary of centralism (which was alien to the internal organization of the inhabitants of the Iberian peninsula and imposed on them, according to Pi), which he deemed to be, along with monarchy, one of the root reasons behind the state of decadence of the Peninsular peoples.

He showed affection for the United States.

== Bibliography ==
- La España Pintoresca, 1841.
- Historia de la Pintura, 1851.
- Estudios de la Edad Media, 1851. Published first on 1873.
- El eco de la revolución, 1854.
- La reacción y la revolución, 1855.
- Declaración de los treinta, 1864.
- La República de 1873, 1874.
- Joyas literarias, 1876.
- Las nacionalidades, 1877.
- Historia General de América, 1878.
- La Federación, 1880.
- Constitución federal, 1883.
- Observaciones sobre el carácter de Don Juan Tenorio, 1884.
- Las luchas de nuestros días, 1884.
- Primeros diálogos, not dated.
- Amadeo de Saboya, not dated.
- Programa del Partido Federal, 1894.

Political offices
Preceded by Estanislao Figueras	President of the Executive Power of Spain; 11 June 1873 – 18 July 1873	Succeeded by Nicolás Salmerón
Preceded by Estanislao Figueras	President of the Provisional Government of Spain; 11 June 1873 – 18 July 1873	Succeeded by Nicolás Salmerón
