= Luis Jiménez de Asúa =

Spanish politician and jurist

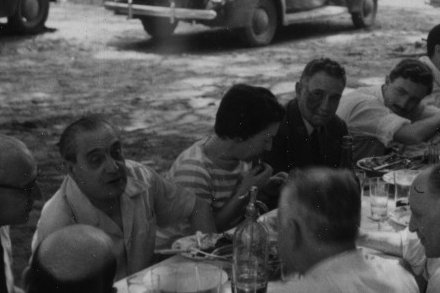
Luis Jiménez de Asúa in Santa Fe, Argentina, in 1958, at a lunch in homage to Sebastián Soler. To his left Ángela Romero Vera, Domingo Buonocuore and Guillermo Estévez Boero.

Luis Jiménez de Asúa (June 19, 1889 in Madrid – November 16, 1970 in Buenos Aires) was a jurist and Spanish politician. He was vice president of the Spanish parliament and representative of that country before the United Nations. During the Francoist dictatorship he exiled himself to Argentina. In 1962 he was named president of the Spanish Republican government in Exile.

== Biography ==
A professor of penal law at the Central University of Madrid). He was confined to the Islas Chafarinas in 1926, for his protest against the exile of Miguel de Unamuno by the dictatorship of Primo de Rivera. In 1931 he entered in the Spanish Socialist Workers' Party (PSOE) and was made a deputy in the Cortes Generales, presiding over the parliamentary commission that had been drafting the Constitution. Director of the Institute of Penal Studies, created by Victoria Kent, he participated in the writing of the Criminal Code of 1932.

Belonging to the moderate wing of the PSOE, he was elected vice president of the Cortes Generales in the 1936 Spanish general election. During the Spanish Civil War he occupied diplomatic charges of the Republic in Poland and Czechoslovakia and represented Spain in the League of Nations. Once the Nationalists won the civil war, he was exiled to Argentina in 1939, where he continued his educational career at the National University of La Plata and the National University of the Littoral and the High School of Penal Law and Criminology at the University of Buenos Aires until the Revolución Argentina of 1966. He directed the Magazine of Criminal Law and Criminology until his death. His Tratado de Derecho Penal in seven volumes, has been respected as a masterpieces of the matter. The Brazilian criminal lawyer Nelson Hungria has said that:

If by an atomic catastrophe all the writings on criminal law were lost except the Tratado of Jiménez de Asúa, the future generations would have lost nothing.

— Nelson Hungria

He maintained a close relation with the student organization reformists of Argentina. Among his disciples was Guillermo Estévez Boero, who would be a president of the Argentine University Federation and then national representative of the Socialist Party of Argentina.

In 1962, he was appointed as president of the Republic in exile, a post he held until his death in 1970 when he was succeeded by José Maldonado González.

== Works ==
- El Derecho penal del porvenir (1916)
- El estado de necesidad (1922)
- Al servicio del Derecho penal
- La teoría jurídica del delito (1931)
- Psicoanálisis criminal (1940) Buenos Aires, Losada.
- El criminalista (1941-1949, 8 vols)
- La Constitución política de la democracia española (1942)
- La ley y el delito (1945)
- La Constitución de la democracia española y el problema regional (1946)
- Tratado de Derecho penal (1949-1963, 7 vols.).

Political offices
Preceded by Diego Martínez Barrio	President of the Congress of Deputies in exile 17 August 1945 – 16 November 1970	Vacant
Preceded by Diego Martínez Barrio	President of the Spanish Republic in exile 11 February 1962 – 16 November 1970	Succeeded by José Maldonado González
