= Estanislao Figueras =

Spanish politician (1819–1882)

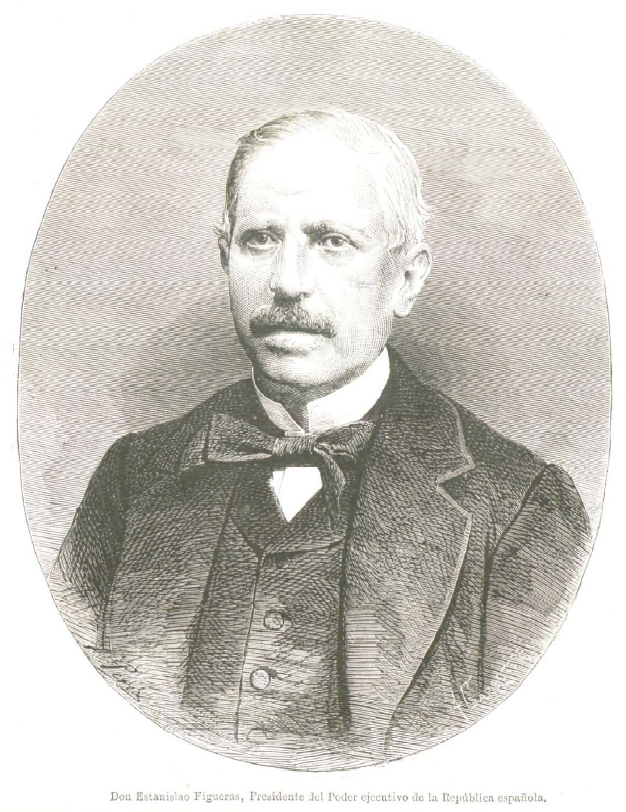

President of the Executive Power of the Republic
- In office 11 February 1873 – 11 June 1873
- Prime Minister: Himself
- Preceded by: Amadeo I (King of Spain)
- Succeeded by: Francisco Pi y Margall

Prime Minister of Spain
- In office 11 February 1873 – 11 June 1873
- President: Himself
- Preceded by: Manuel Ruiz Zorrilla
- Succeeded by: Francisco Pi y Margall

Personal details
- Born: 13 November 1819 Barcelona, Spain
- Died: 11 November 1882 (aged 62) Madrid, Spain
- Party: Progressist (1848–1849); Democratic (1849–1868); Democratic Federal Republican (1868–1880); Organic Federal Republican (1880–1882)

Estanislao Figueras y Moragas (13 November 1819 – 11 November 1882) was a Spanish politician who served as the first President of the First Republic from 12 February to 11 June 1873.

== Biography ==
Figueras was born in Barcelona on 13 November 1819.

He led the Republican Party after Queen Isabella II was overthrown in 1868. He briefly became president after King Amadeo abdicated. He was succeeded as president by Francisco Pi y Margall. He is famous for having said, after one more fruitless Council of Ministers: "Gentlemen, I can not stand this anymore. I will be frank to you: I am up to my bollocks of all of us." After the 1875 restoration of the monarchy he withdrew from public life. He died in Madrid on 11 November 1882 at the age of 62, just two days before his 63rd birthday.

== Bibliography ==
- Bermejo, Ildefonso Antonio (1877). Historia de la interinidad y guerra civil de España desde 1868 (in Spanish). Vol. III. R. Labajos.
- Rolandi Sánchez-Solís, Manuel (2009). El republicanismo y el federalismo español del siglo XIX: la búsqueda de un nuevo orden político y social al servicio de los ciudadanos (in Spanish). Madrid: Centro de Investigación y Estudios Republicanos. ISBN 9788461294497.
- Urquijo Goitia, José Ramón (2008). Gobiernos y ministros españoles en la edad contemporánea. Editorial CSIC. ISBN 978-84-00-08737-1.

Political offices
New office First Spanish Republic Declared	President of the Executive Power of Spain; 11 February 1873 – 11 June 1873	Succeeded by Francisco Pi
Preceded by Amadeo as King of Spain	Head of State of Spain as President of the Executive Power; 11 February 1873 – 11 June 1873	Succeeded by Francisco Pi
Preceded by Manuel Ruiz Zorrilla as Prime Minister of Spain	President of the Provisional Government of Spain; 12 February 1873 – 11 June 1873	Succeeded by Francisco Pi
