= Popular Front (Spain) =

Left-wing political party in the Second Spanish Republic from 1936 to 1939

Popular Front Frente Popular (Spanish) Front d'Esquerres (Catalan)
- Leader: Manuel Azaña
- Founded: January 1936
- Dissolved: 1939
- Ideology: Republicanism (Spanish); Secularism; Anti-fascism; Big tent; Factions: Anarcho-syndicalism; Catalan nationalism; Communism; Liberalism (Spanish); Social democracy; Socialism
- Political position: Left-wing; Factions: Centre-left to far-left
- Colors: Red

Party flag

The Popular Front (Spanish: Frente Popular) was an electoral alliance and pact formed in January 1936 to contest that year's general election by various left-wing political organizations during the Second Spanish Republic. The alliance was led by Manuel Azaña. In Catalonia and the modern-day Valencian Community, the coalition was known as the Front of the Lefts (Catalan: Front d'Esquerres).

The Popular Front included the Spanish Socialist Workers' Party (PSOE), Communist Party of Spain (PCE), and the republicans: Republican Left (IR), (led by Azaña) and Republican Union (UR), led by Diego Martínez Barrio. This pact was supported by Galician (PG) and Catalan nationalists (ERC), the POUM, socialist union Workers' General Union (UGT), and the anarchist trade union, the Confederación Nacional del Trabajo (CNT). Many anarchists who would later fight alongside Popular Front forces during the Spanish Civil War did not support them in the election, urging abstention instead.

The Comintern had decided in 1935 that, in response to the growth of fascism, popular fronts allying communist parties with other anti-fascist parties including Socialist and even bourgeois parties were advisable. In Spain, it was a coalition between leftist republicans and workers' organizations to defend social reforms of the first government (1931–1933) of the Second Spanish Republic, and liberate the prisoners, political prisoners according with the front propaganda, held since the Asturian October Revolution (1934).

The Popular Front defeated the National Front (a collection of right-wing parties) and won the 1936 election, forming the new Spanish Government. Manuel Azaña was elected President of the Republic in May 1936, but the PSOE did not join the government because of the opposition of Francisco Largo Caballero.

In July 1936, conservative/monarchist generals instigated a coup d'état which started the Spanish Civil War (1936–1939). The Government dissolved the Spanish Republican Army in the loyal territory and brought weapons to armed groups organized by the unions (UGT and CNT) and workers' parties (PSOE, PCE, POUM) that had initial success in defeating the Francoist forces in Madrid, Barcelona, Bilbao and Valencia. In October the same year, the Spanish Republican Army was reorganized. After a protracted war of attrition, General Francisco Franco would defeat the Republican forces and rule Spain as a dictatorship until his death in 1975.

== History ==
=== Foundation and the manifesto of the Popular Front ===
The Popular Front was formed in 1936 by a coalition of left-wing and republican parties. The Popular Front's founding manifesto condemned the actions of the conservative-led government, demanding the release of political prisoners detained after November 1933, the re-hiring of state employees who had been suspended, fired, or transferred "without due process or for reasons of political persecution", it proposed establishing a judiciary independent from government control, the investigation and prosecution of acts of unwarranted violence by police, and revision of the Law of Public Order to protect the rights of citizens against arbitrary power. The manifesto stressed political moderation against radicalism.

The manifesto advocated a moderate left-leaning economic policy that rejected the idea of nationalization of land and instead supported the provision of state economic assistance to agriculture, a new progressive tenancy law, and promotion of collective forms of production. It supported protectionist measures to defend national industry, encouraged state research to assist national industry, promised protection of small businesses, major expansion of public works, and progressive tax reform. The manifesto declared the Popular Front's opposition to class-based society, stating "The Republic conceived of by the Republican parties is not a Republic dominated by social or economic class interests, but a regime of democratic liberty..." but it promised the restoration of certain economic policies of the 1931–33 Spanish government, including increased wages for farmworkers. It repeatedly stated the opposition of the republican parties to some pretensions of the working-class parties, thus making clear points of disagreement.

The manifesto promised the restoration of legislation guaranteeing regional autonomy that was revoked by the conservative-led government.

=== Members ===
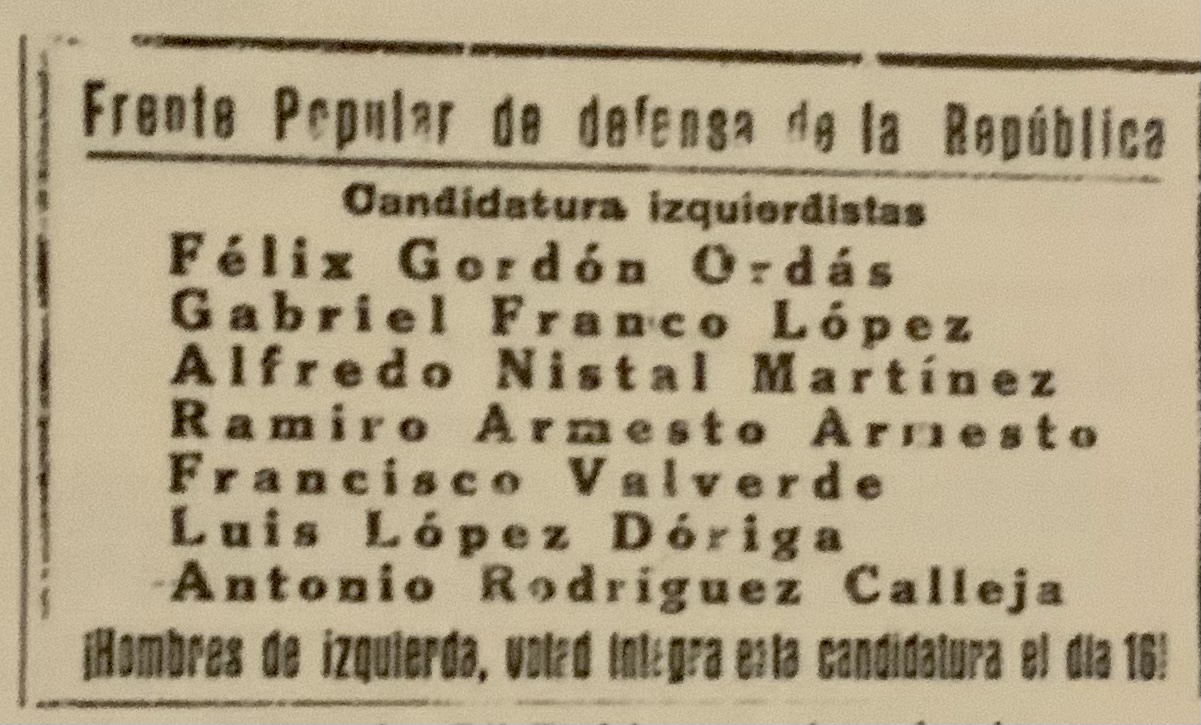
Popular Front electoral advertisement in León

==== Member parties ====
| Name | Ideology |
|---|---|
| Spanish Socialist Workers' Party | Socialism |
| Communist Party of Spain | Communism |
| Workers' Party of Marxist Unification | Anti-Stalinist Marxism |
| Syndicalist Party | Syndicalism |
| Republican Left | Republicanism |
| Republican Union | Republicanism |
| Republican Left of Catalonia | Catalan nationalism |
| Galicianist Party | Galician nationalism |
| Basque Nationalist Action | Basque nationalism |

==== Supporting trade unions ====
| Name | Ideology |
|---|---|
| Workers' General Union | Socialism |
| CNT-FAI | Anarcho-syndicalism |

=== 1936 election and immediate aftermath ===
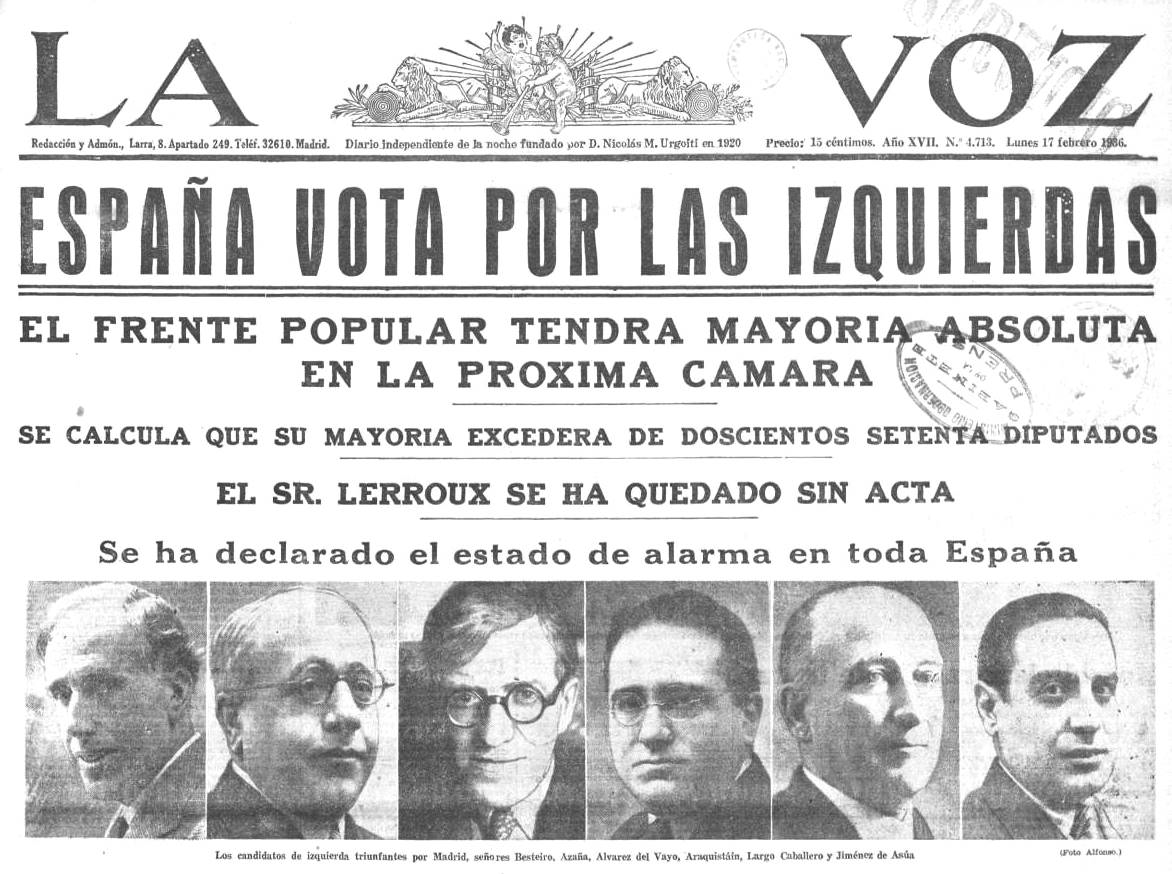
La Voz announces the victory of the Popular Front, 17 February 1936

In the 1936 general election, the Popular Front won the election with its leader Manuel Azaña elected President of Spain. The Popular Front received 4,654,116 votes compared to the opponent combined right-wing vote of 4,503,524 votes. It elected 278 deputies – 99 of which belonged to the Socialists (PSOE), while the right-wing elected 124 deputies – 88 of which belonged to the CEDA. Many of the elected members of the Popular Front were professional persons, several of whom were from wealthy backgrounds. People of various political backgrounds within the Popular Front were appointed to President Azaña's cabinet, such as Amós Salvador, architect and wealthy landowner, and José Alonso Mallol, a former Radical Socialist. Upon the election of the Popular Front, the Popular Front held a victory march in Madrid with over 250,000 supporters, with its Socialist and Communist party components marching in uniform in the thousands. The Popular Front immediately delivered its promise in its manifesto of rehiring workers fired for political reasons without due process and to reimburse them based on individual cases for wages lost to an extent of not less than thirty-nine days' wages nor more than six months. Several other reforms affecting working conditions were also carried out, together with reforms in other areas such as education, land tenure, public health, and child welfare.

Azaña responded to the recent surge of acts of violence, arson, and vandalism by radical leftists against right-wing parties and Catholic Church institutions by denouncing these actions. Uncontrolled political violence continued through to March with the greatest disturbance taking place in Granada where a violent act by right-wing political forces provoked a general strike and mass riot by left-wing political forces there. In particular, violence involving Communists and Socialists versus Falangists resulted in multiple murders. By July there had been 269 political killings.

Azaña acceded to demands by left-wing movements for punishment of General Eduardo López Ochoa, the army leader of the 1934 Asturian campaign against workers' movements there. The Spanish Republican government also made major changes to the Spanish Army, pro-Republican or neutral commanders were installed in multiple posts while commanders with questionable loyalties were moved to lesser or remote positions: for example, General Francisco Franco was removed as chief of staff of the army and moved to a position in the Canary Islands and General Emilio Mola was demoted from a major command in Spanish Morocco to a position as commander of a brigade in Pamplona.

The government did not stay in power long, mainly because of the conflict of ideological views by many of the parties. The only factor working for the government was unity for the conquest of fascism. After the Republican defeat in the Spanish Civil War, the popular front was dissolved, and Franco ruled Spain as a dictator until his death in 1975.

== See also ==
- 1936 in the Spanish Civil War
- Popular Front (France)
