= Republican Union (Spain, 1934) =

Republican Union Unión Republicana
- Leader: Diego Martínez Barrio
- Founded: 1934
- Dissolved: 1959
- Merger of: Radical Democratic Party; Radical Socialist Republican Party
- Merged into: Spanish Democratic Republican Action
- Ideology: Republicanism; Progressivism; Social liberalism Anti-clericalism
- Political position: Centre-left
- National affiliation: Popular Front

The Republican Union (Spanish: Unión Republicana) was a Spanish republican party founded in 1934 by Diego Martinez Barrio.

It was formed as a result of a merger of several small republican parties, most notably Diego Martinez Barrio's Radical Democratic Party and the Radical Socialist Republican Party, both of which had split away from the more moderate Radical Republican Party of Alejandro Lerroux.

Integrated into the Popular Front ahead of the 1936 election, the party won 38 seats becoming the fourth largest party. It formed a governing coalition with Manuel Azaña's Republican Left. Though it participated in all republican governments during the Spanish Civil War, it played a minor role starting under Largo Caballero's government.

In exile in Mexico, it was the main support of the Republican government-in-exile until it was dissolved in 1959 to found the Spanish Democratic Republican Action along with the Republican Left.

== See also ==
- Republican Union (Spain, 1893)
- Republican Union (Spain, 1903)
