= Canton of Cartagena =

Short-lived independent state formed in the region of Murcia

Canton of Cartagena Cantón de Cartagena (Spanish)
- 1873–1874
- Flag
- Capital: Cartagena
- Government: Commune (junta)
- Historical era: Sexenio Democrático
  - Established: 12 July 1873
  - Disestablished: 12 January 1874
Preceded by	Succeeded by
First Spanish Republic	First Spanish Republic
- Today part of: Spain

The Canton of Cartagena (Spanish: Cantón de Cartagena), also known as the Canton of Murcia (Spanish: Cantón Murciano), was a period of Cartagena, Spain's history when it was governed by a radical cantonalist junta for six months between 1873 and 1874. The city rose up in armed insurrection on 12 July 1873 establishing the Canton's de facto independence from the First Spanish Republic and beginning a wave of cantonal rebellions across southern Spain. Loosely inspired by the more well-known Paris Commune two years earlier, the Canton of Cartagena existed during a turbulent revolutionary period of Spanish history known as the Sexenio Democrático.

== History ==
Map of the Cantonal rebellions in 1873 showing Cartagena and the precursor revolution in Alcoy.

=== Background ===
With King Amadeo I's abdication on 11 February 1873 after a brief 2-year reign, the Spanish Republic was proclaimed by the Spanish Cortes. After winning power in the republic's May 1873 elections, President of the Executive Power, Francesc Pi i Margall, signaled that the republic would transition from a unitary state to a federation following the completion and adoption of a new constitution for Spain.

In southern Spain, federalist sentiment was strong and tied to the concept of autonomous cantons or communes. At the time, anarchist theory (inspired particularly by Mikhail Bakunin) had been circulating through Spain with aid from the First International. The Spanish chapter of the International (FRE-AIT) was established in Barcelona in 1870. After the Marxist and anarchist split at the International's 1872 Hague Congress, the FRE-AIT associated with the anarchist wing of the International. President Francesc Pi himself was a Proudhonist who was interested in establishing a decentralized Spanish political network.

During the first chaotic months of the Spanish Republic following the 1873 election, the FRE-AIT sensed an opportunity to organize a general strike in Alcoy, one of the most industrialized cities in Spain at the time. The organized workers' revolt began on 9 July 1873 and escalated quickly into the Petroleum Revolution, so-named because it involved workers torching Alcoy City Hall with petroleum. The rebellion was suppressed by the federal government within four days.

=== Establishment ===
With the success of Francesc Pi's Federal Democratic Republican Party in the 1873 election, many Spaniards saw the decentralization of Spain into federated cantons as an inevitable outcome. President Pi's government believed that decentralization would need to be top-down in order to legally establish the autonomy of individual cantons. By July 1873, tensions were growing in southern Spain with more radical federalists (known as "intransigents") believing that the election's results had provided a mandate to establish autonomous cantons from the bottom-up.

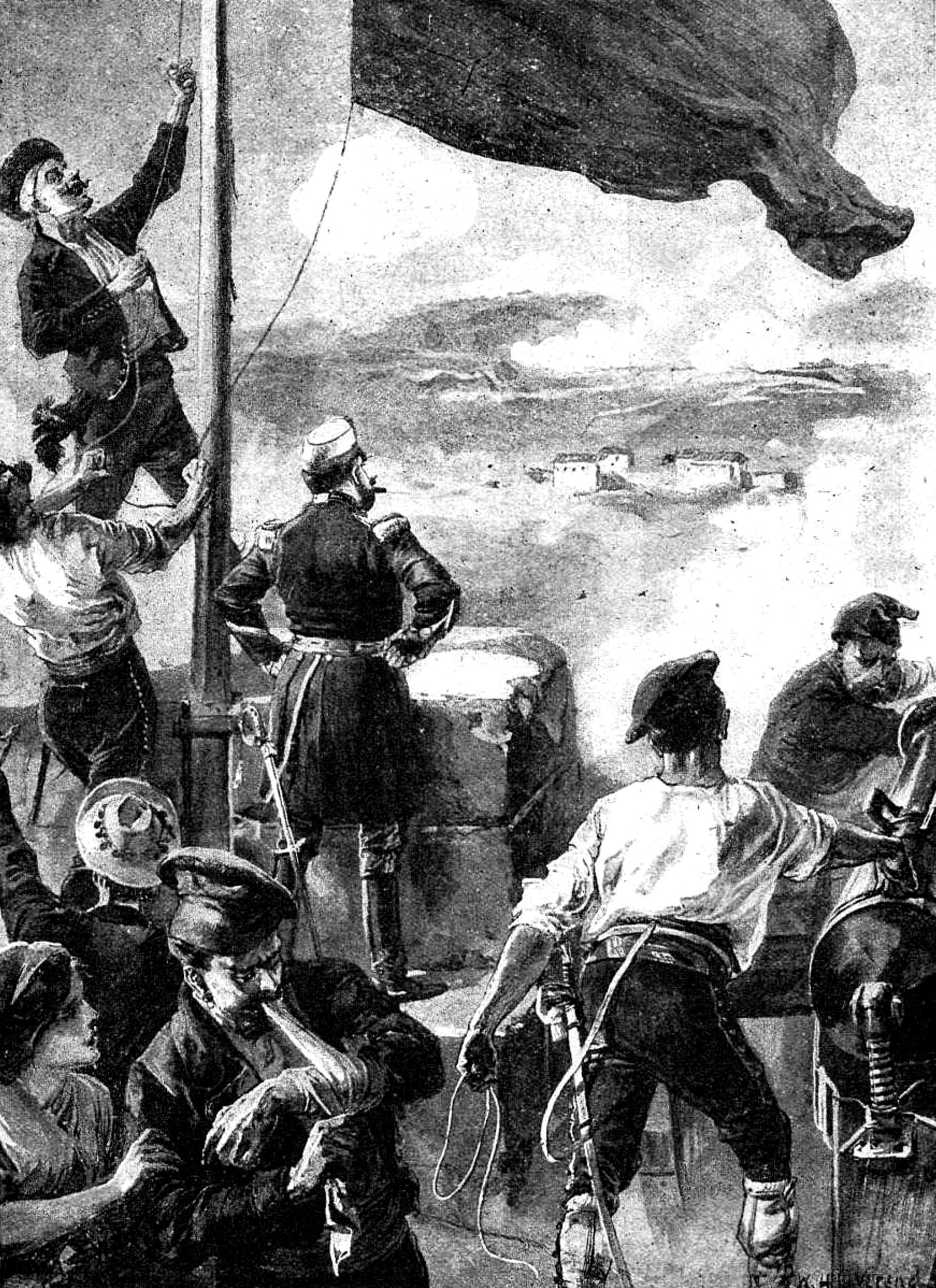
Hoisting of the blood-stained red flag above the Castle of Galeras

Cartagena, on the southern Murcian coast, contained Spain's primary Mediterranean naval base. The notion of forming an independent canton in Cartagena modeled after the 1871 Paris Commune was first proposed by Roque Barcia who chaired the intransigent Central Revolutionary Committee in Madrid. After news of the uprising in Alcoy reached Cartagena, a volunteer garrison at the Castle of Galeras refused to be relieved by a Spanish Army regiment on 12 July and forced the regiment to withdraw. Wishing to signal the taking of the castle with a socialist red flag but without red dye available, the insurgents instead hoisted a blood-stained flag of the Ottoman Empire above the castle to declare the canton's independence.

A provisional junta was quickly established in Cartagena City Hall, led by Manuel Cárceles Sabater. Antonio Gálvez Arce was proclaimed general of the canton's military forces and was able to persuade the naval garrison situated in the port to side with the cantonal rebels, thus providing the junta with its own fleet. The Committee of Public Safety sent Juan Contreras y Román from Madrid to help organize the rebel troops in Cartagena. Barcia would soon follow Contreras to Cartagena after the intransigents were purged from Madrid. Originally called the Canton of Murcia, the junta hoped that the entire Region of Murcia would join the autonomous canton. Though inspired by the Petroleum Revolution in Alcoy, the FRE-AIT did not take part in the organization of the canton.

=== Expansion ===
Within days of the insurrection in Cartagena, uprisings spread throughout Murcia and southern Spain leading to the larger Cantonal rebellion. Many communities in Murcia declared their allegiance with the Murcian Canton while other communities declared their own autonomous cantons. President Francesc Pi, sympathetic to the cantonal cause, attempted to negotiate with the provisional junta in Cartagena. Unsuccessful, Pi was forced to resign on 18 July and was replaced by the moderate Nicolás Salmerón y Alonso. Salmerón, unlike Pi, made it known he was willing to suppress rebellious cantons with force if necessary.

Cartagena was quick to mobilize both its navy and army in spreading the cantonal movement. Galvez, in command of the frigate Vitoria, reached Alicante on 20 July where the Canton of Alicante was established. On 21 July, a force of 2,000 left Cartagena and took Lorca by 25 July before moving on to the regional capital of Murcia. A second maritime expedition, this time led by Contreras, left Cartagena on 28 July and arrived in Almería the next day. Almería did not yield to cantonal expansion so Contreras turned to Málaga instead where the expedition was captured on 1 August by a small German and British naval force that had declared the cantonal forces to be pirates. A second land expedition left Cartagena for Orihuela on 30 July and after the Battle of Orihuela, brought the city to the cantonalists side. A third land expedition of 3,000 men left in early August for Chinchilla where Galvez hoped to cut off the railway line between Madrid and Valencia, which had recently declared itself the Valencian Canton. The cantonal forces were defeated on 10 August in the Battle of Chinchilla and Galvez was forced to retreat back to Murcia.

=== Defeat ===
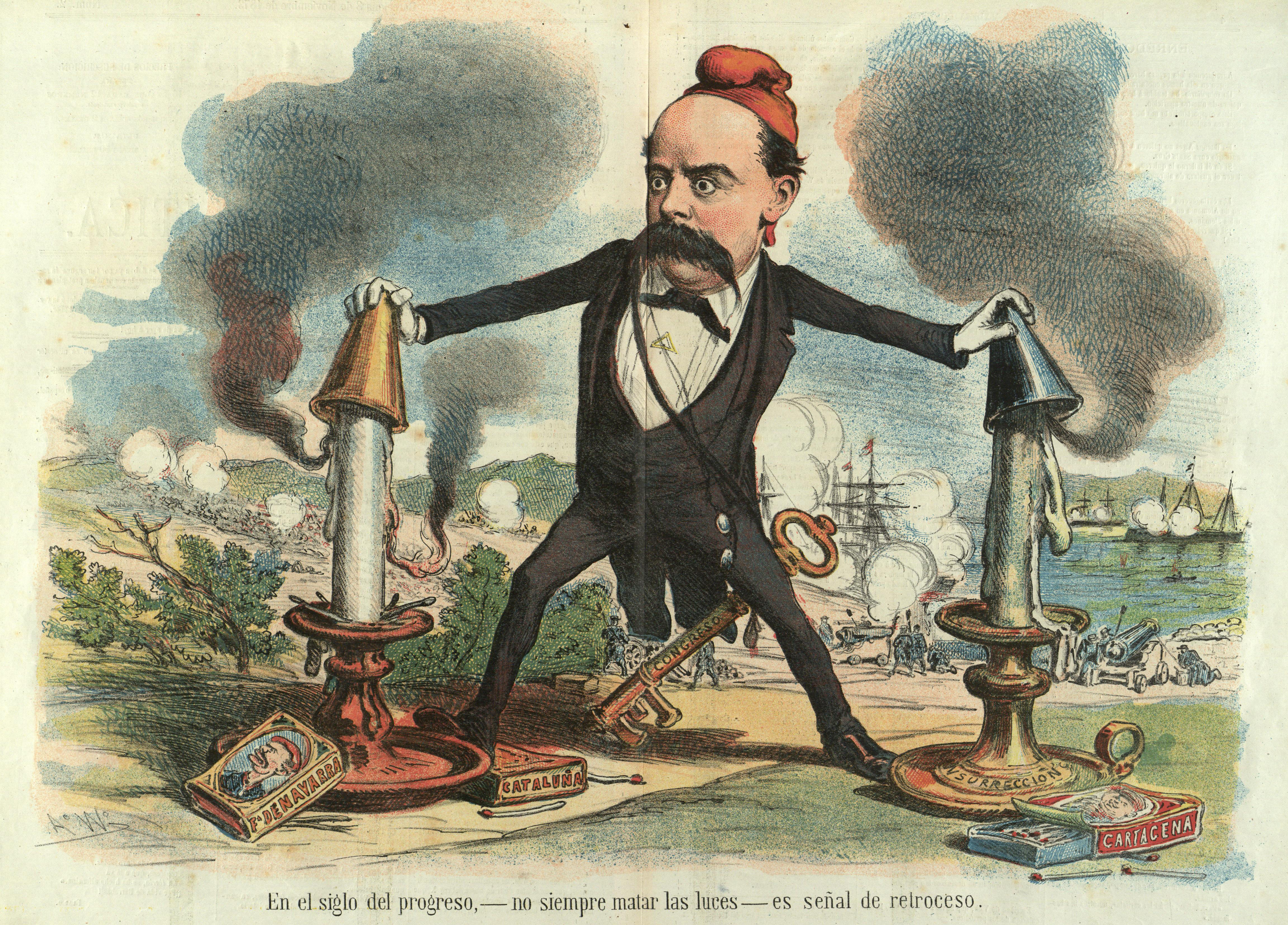
Political characture of Emilio Castelar in 1873 caught between the Carlist revolt in Navarre and the cantonal insurrection in Cartagena

After the Battle of Chinchilla, Salmerón was able to re-establish republican control in much of southern Spain under the command of General Arsenio Martínez Campos. By 12 August, all other independent cantons had dissolved and the remaining intransigent rebels in the region fell back to the defensible Cartagena where the canton became commonly known as the Canton of Cartagena. In mid-August, the republican army encircled Cartagena and began the Siege of Cartagena (1873), but the cantonal forces retained their naval fleet and were initially able to repel republican advances by sea. On 7 September, Salmerón was replaced by the more conservative Emilio Castelar y Ripoll as President of the Executive Power. Pressured by the cantonal rebellion in the south and a monarchist Carlist war in the north, Castelar was granted emergency executive powers by the Cortes to bring all of Spain back into the First Republic's control.

Castelar's first attempt to besiege Cartagena by sea was thwarted on 16 October during the Battle of Portman. Emboldened by their success at sea, a cantonal fleet including junta members Barcia and Contreras left Cartagena on 17 October hoping to re-establish the Canton of Valencia, but turned back on 19 October after a second cantonal insurrection in Valencia failed to materialize. In November 1873, under the command of republican General José López Domínguez, a bombardment of Cartagena commenced. The situation in Cartagena grew more dire through the final weeks of 1873 as the provisional junta was unable to secure any foreign allies and city suffered an average of 1,200 shellings per day. Roque Barcia, faced with the development of events, sent on 16 December 1873 a letter to the President of the United States, Ulysses S. Grant, through his ambassador in Madrid, Daniel E. Sickles, in which he requested to raise the American flag in the canton in order to avoid the bombing, without it finally being carried out.

The First Spanish Republic based in Madrid was unable to maintain its loose grip on control and on 3 January 1874, the federal government was overthrown in a coup led by Manuel Pavía establishing a military dictatorship. Any hope in Cartagena for recognition of the cantonal system was lost after Pavia's coup. On 7 January, an explosion at an artillery storehouse in Cartagena killed over 300, mostly civilians. Finally, on 12 January, the City surrendered and the remaining cantonal leaders with approximately 500 refugees fled by frigate to Algeria. The next day, government troops entered Cartagena.

=== Aftermath ===
With most intransigents either killed or escaped, Cartagena was easily pacified. The city was largely devastated after the siege and it is estimated that approximately 70% of the city's buildings were destroyed.

Not only did the radical cantonal movement collapse with the fall of Cartagena, so too did hope for the stability of republicanism in Spain. Later that same year, the Bourbon monarchy was restored. The Second Spanish Republic was established 57 years later and would also precede a period of radicalism in Spain. Anarcho-syndicalism in the spirit of the cantonal movement would be revived by the Confederación Nacional del Trabajo (CNT) in Catalonia in the 1930s.

== See also ==
- Cantonal Rebellion
- Paris Commune
- Spanish Revolution of 1936
