= Canton of Alicante =

Short-lived state during the Cantonal rebellion

The Canton of Alicante was a short-lived canton formed during the cantonal rebellion that took place in Spain under the First Spanish Republic. It was created on 20 July as a result of a maritime expedition from the Canton of Cartagena (also known as Murcian Canton), but as soon as the Murcian envoys left to return to Cartagena, the centralist (supporters of the Madrid government) local authorities regained control and put an end to the canton on 23 July.

== History ==
The first maritime expedition of the Murcian Canton took place on 20 July 1873. In this expedition two ships left Cartagena: the steamboat Fernando el Católico under the command of General Juan Contreras towards Mazarrón and Águilas on the Murcian coast, and the armored frigate Vitoria under the command of Antonio Gálvez Arce towards Alicante. In principle, the two missions were successful because Mazarrón and Águilas were incorporated into the Murcian Canton and Gálvez proclaimed the canton of Alicante, establishing a Board of Public Health. However, three days after Vitoria returned to Cartagena, the centralist authorities regained control of Alicante and put an end to the canton. Gálvez returned with the ship Vigilante, which was requisitioned by the centralists in the port of Alicante, and made a stop in Torrevieja where a commission met with him to join the Murcian Canton, ceasing to belong to the province of Alicante. But when on 23 July the Vigilante was about to enter Cartagena, it was intercepted by the German frigate SMS Friedrich Carl, making use of the decree recently approved by the government of Nicolás Salmerón y Alonso that declared all ships flying the red flag as "cantonal pirates" (so that they could be seized by ships from any country even within waters under Spanish jurisdiction). In addition, Commodore R. Werner, commander of the Friedrich Carl, demanded the surrender of the frigate Vitoria, which had also raised the red flag. Finally, the Board of Cartagena delivered Vigilante to Werner but not Vitoria, which was kept safe in the port.
