= Manuel Cárceles Sabater =

Spanish writer, doctor, politician and one of the protagonists of the Cantonal rebellion

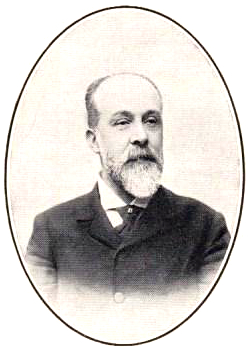
- Born: March 11, 1850; Cartagena, Spain
- Died: July 18, 1933 (aged 83); Madrid, Spain
- Occupations: Writer, doctor, politician
- Organization(s): Federal Democratic Republican Party; Republican–Socialist Conjunction

Manuel Cárceles Sabater (Cartagena, March 11, 1850 - Madrid, July 18, 1933) was a Spanish writer, doctor, politician and one of the protagonists of the Cantonal rebellion of 1873 in Cartagena.

== Biography ==
=== Cantonal rebellion ===
When the First Spanish Republic was proclaimed in 1873, Manuel Cárceles was a 23-year-old student studying medicine at the Central University of Madrid. Despite his young age, he had deep federalist convictions – he had chaired the Republican Youth Association (Asociación de la Juventud Republicana) since 1869 and belonged to the Federal Democratic Republican Party (Partido Republicano Democrático Federal). He had demonstrated a great ability as a speaker, which added to his roaming between the nation's capital and his hometown and gave him the opportunity to stand out in political circles. Thus, shortly after the failed coup sponsored by the unitary republicans, Cárceles was found giving a speech at a demonstration on April 27 which demanded the immediate establishment of a federal republic, insisting on this request at another rally the following month. When a Public Health Committee was created in Madrid, which under the presidency of Roque Barcia began to hatch the conspiracy that was to overthrow the centralist model, Cárceles was one of its main agents in Cartagena. He recommended that Barcia advance the insurrection, given the announced departure from the city of some ships and regiments that were going to be useful for the uprising, to which Barcia refused. Despite this, on July 12 the cantonal rebellion took place in Cartagena, in which Cárceles participated in command of the group of Volunteers of the Republic (Voluntarios de la República) and armed civilians who occupied the City Hall, the San José and Muelle Gates, and the Telegraph House, on behalf of a local Revolutionary Junta in which he refused to hold a position. He had less success leading the first attempt to gain support from the crews of the ships anchored in the port, as he was repelled by the officers, who retained the loyalty of their subordinates until the arrival of Antonio Gálvez Arce.

After the revolt had advanced, on August 1, the rebels' frigates Almansa and Vitoria were sailing towards Malaga after the bombardment of Almería, when as a result of the decree of the Salmerón Government declaring the rebel ships pirates, the ironclad German Friedrich Carl captured them. Manuel Cárceles was in favor of the use of force to recover them but, when the crowd became frustrated by the events, he prevented reprisals from being carried out against the republicans of Cartagena, whom the mob blamed for the decree.

Afterwards, he agreed to hold a position as a member and secretary of the Navy Commission (Comisión de Marina ) in the Sovereign Board of Public Salvation (Junta Soberana de Salvación Pública), recently constituted in the face of a siege situation in Cartagena and with the cantonalists already in retreat.

Manuel Cárceles, like all those who had been members of the Revolutionary Junta, was excluded from the pardon promised by the besieging general José López Domínguez and so, to avoid his capture after the fall of the Canton of Cartagena on January 12, 1874, he embarked on the armoured frigate Numancia and, together with 1635 other people, headed for exile in Oran after breaking the blockade held by the government fleet.

=== Later life ===
In the relative safety of French Algeria, the activities of Manuel Cárceles and other cantonal leaders were closely watched by the Spanish consulate in Oran, which in 1874 notified him that it had made an application for a passport for Switzerland. After a few years, he was expatriated aboard the Numancia, since in 1878 he was sentenced in absence to death by the Military Commission of Cartagena. Despite being handed down a final sentence, Cárceles managed to return to Spain and practice his medical profession, eventually having his own renowned doctor's office in Madrid, where he was finally pardoned, more than thirty years after the verdict.

He remained linked to the Federal Republican Party, although he did not take part in active politics again more than once in 1913, when he was a candidate with the Republican-Socialist Conjunction for councilor in the Buenavista district in Madrid municipal elections. Except for that occasion, he found a substitute for public life in writing, editing a treatise on the game of checkers in 1904 and a book of poetry in 1915. Nevertheless, he kept an eye on the treatment of the cantonal experience and his particular participation by the press, and between 1914 and 1920 he corresponded on this matter with the historian Antonio Puig Campillo, who was gathering information for his book El cantón murciano (1932). In those letters he justified his actions and was critical of the memoirs of the rebellion written by some of his interveners, such as Captain Eduardo García Alcántara or the French Communard Joseph Lucien Combatz.

He lived long enough to see the Second Republic founded in 1931. Months after its proclamation, the Cartagena City Council organized a visit to the city from Madrid, during which he was honored by the authorities and local republican circles.

In 1933 he died, and as a tribute to him, Rey Francisco street in the Madrid neighborhood of Argüelles was renamed "Doctor Cárceles", although this name did not survive.

== Popular culture ==
Because of his significance in the events of the Cantonal Rebellion, Cárceles makes an appearance in the historical novels De Cartago a Sagunto (1911) by Benito Pérez Galdós, and Míster Witt en el cantón (1935) by Ramón J. Sender.

== Works ==
- Historias de clínica de obstetricia y enfermedades de mujeres y niños revisadas por el doctor don José González Olivares, y publicadas por Manuel Cárceles Sabater. Madrid: Imprenta y Estereotipia de Álvarez Hermanos. 1878.
- Tratado del juego de damas. Madrid: Establecimiento Tipográfico Sucesores de Rivadeneyra. 1904.
- Ilusiones y realidades. Madrid: Establecimiento Tipográfico Sucesores de Rivadeneyra. 1915.
