= Battle of Chinchilla =

- Part of Cantonal rebellion
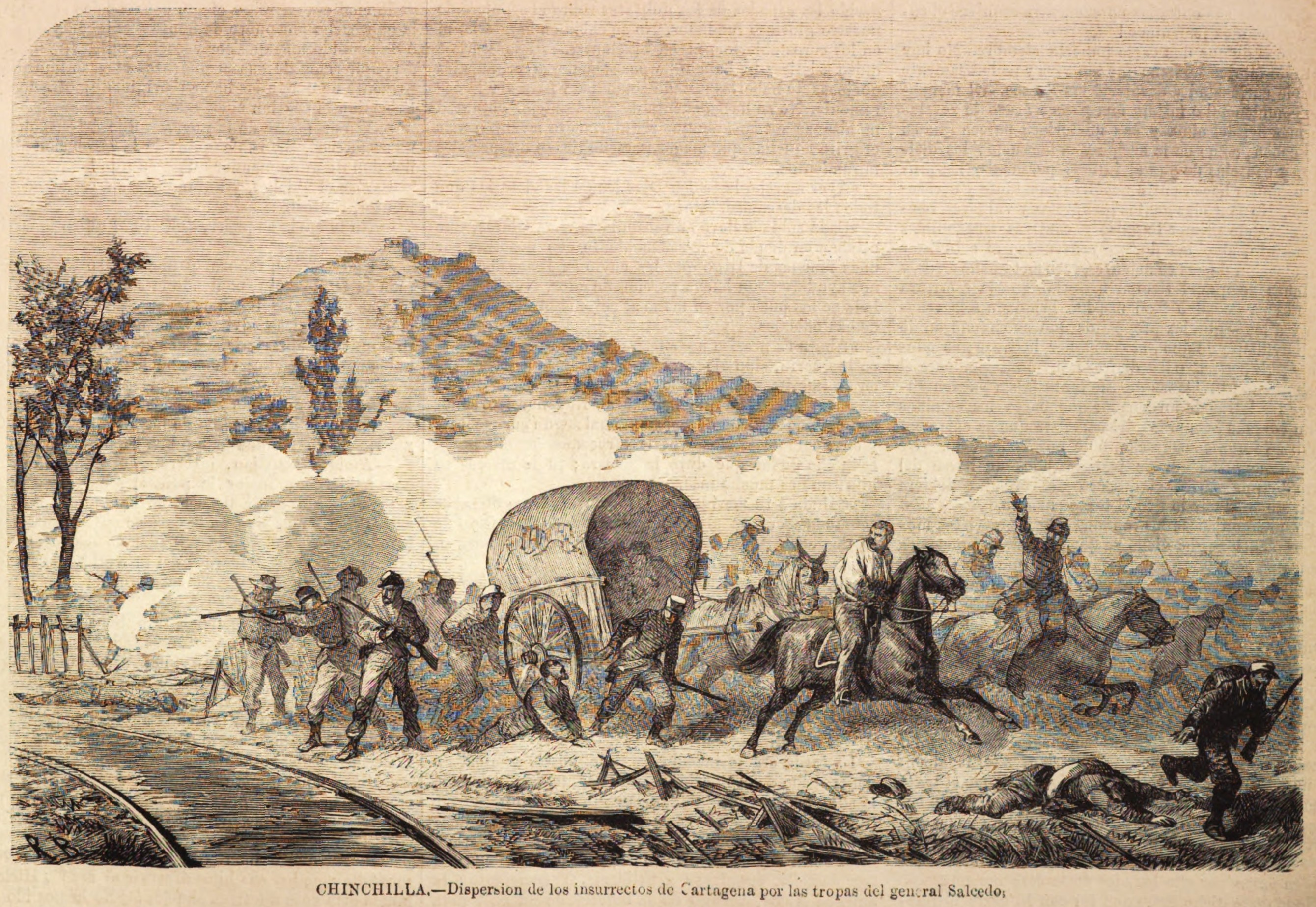
- Retreat of the cantonalist troops in the Battle of Chinchilla, La Ilustración Española y Americana
Date	10 August 1873
Location	Chinchilla de Montearagón, Spain
Result	Republican victory

Belligerents
First Spanish Republic	Canton of Cartagena

Commanders and leaders
Arsenio Martínez Campos	Antonio Gálvez

Strength
8,000 infantry 10 canons	3,000 infantry 6 canons

Casualties and losses
Unknown	500 infantry 4 canons

The Battle of Chinchilla took place on 10 August 1873 in the context of the Cantonal rebellion, between the Canton of Cartagena and the First Spanish Republic. The result was a heavy defeat for the cantonalists.

== The battle ==
At the beginning of August 1873, Antonio Gálvez and General Juan Contreras y Román led a third land expedition in the direction of Chinchilla made up of 3,000 men distributed in three trains. The purpose of this expedition was to cut off the railway communication with Madrid of the army of General Arsenio Martínez Campos, who had surrounded Valencia, capital of the Valencian Canton. The first combats took place at the Chinchilla railway station, where the cantonalists managed to oust the troops sent by Martínez Campos upon learning their plans. But when the cantonalists received news that the Valencian Canton had fallen, they started withdrawing. The government forces took advantage of the cantonalists retreat and counterattacked supported by the artillery, causing panic and the disbandment of their enemies' forces. Finally Gálvez and Contreras managed to reorganize their forces, receiving the help of the reserve column that had remained in Hellín. Thus they were able to return to Murcia, arriving there on August 10, at night. The battle of Chinchilla was a disaster for the cantonalists who lost nearly 500 men, including 28 chiefs and officers, as well as 51 wagons, four cannons and 250 rifles, and above all because it left Martínez Campos with an open path to occupy Murcia.
