= Battle of Orihuela (1873) =

Battle in Spain

- Part of the Cantonal Rebellion
Date	August 30, 1873
Location	Orihuela
Result	Cantonal victory

Belligerents
Canton of Cartagena	First Spanish Republic

Commanders and leaders
Antonio Gálvez	Mariano Artés Campillo

Casualties and losses
1 dead 2 wounded	14 dead 9 wounded 2 prisoners

The Battle of Orihuela took place in Spain on August 30, 1873, between the forces of the Canton of Cartagena, led by Antonio Gálvez, and the government forces, led by the military governor Ruiz Piñero and Mariano Artés Campillo. The fight ended with victory for the cantonalists and resulted in Orihuela's adherence to the revolutionary cause.

== Background ==
On August 30, 1873, a few days after the bombardment of Almería, an expedition under Antonete Gálvez left Cartagena with the objective of attracting the city of Orihuela, then at the hands of the Government of Spain, to the cantonalists' side.

The cantonalists' expedition left Cartagena at dawn, and arrived in Orihuela at approximately 5, after being joined along the way by artillery and volunteers from Murcia, led by José María Callejas. The insurgent militias entered the market and various other parts of the city, causing panic among the population.

== The battle ==
The only resistance that the cantonalists found was from the garrison, which was made up of some civil guards and forty policemen, whose captain was Mariano Artés Campillo. The garrison tried to resist Gálvez in the so-called Paseo de la Glorieta, but in a withdrawal they found themselves surprised by the insurgent forces of Pedro del Real, who had entered the city by fording the Segura river and crossing the Callosa highway. Said forces used their artillery, which totally tilted the result of the battle in favor of Cartagena and Murcia. Among the government garrison, two prisoners were taken and there were fourteen dead and nine wounded, while the cantonalists had one dead, two wounded and several bruised.

Due to the unforeseen nature of that fight, the insurgents had not brought medical supplies with them. In vain they tried to ask for them in Orihuela, where the apothecaries refused to give them to them. After the refusal, Antonete Gálvez had a cannon brought with which he blew up the door of the pharmacy and the cantonalists were served at the moment.

== Consequences ==
Once the possession of the city was secured by Gálvez's men, they dismissed the City Council and constitute a revolutionary junta, with which Orihuela passed to the federal side and became a canton. As in each city, the cantonalists collected several thousand pesetas for military expenses, after which the expedition returned to their respective homes, the prisoners being taken aboard Isabel II and released after a few days.
