= Roque Barcia =

Roque Barcia Martí
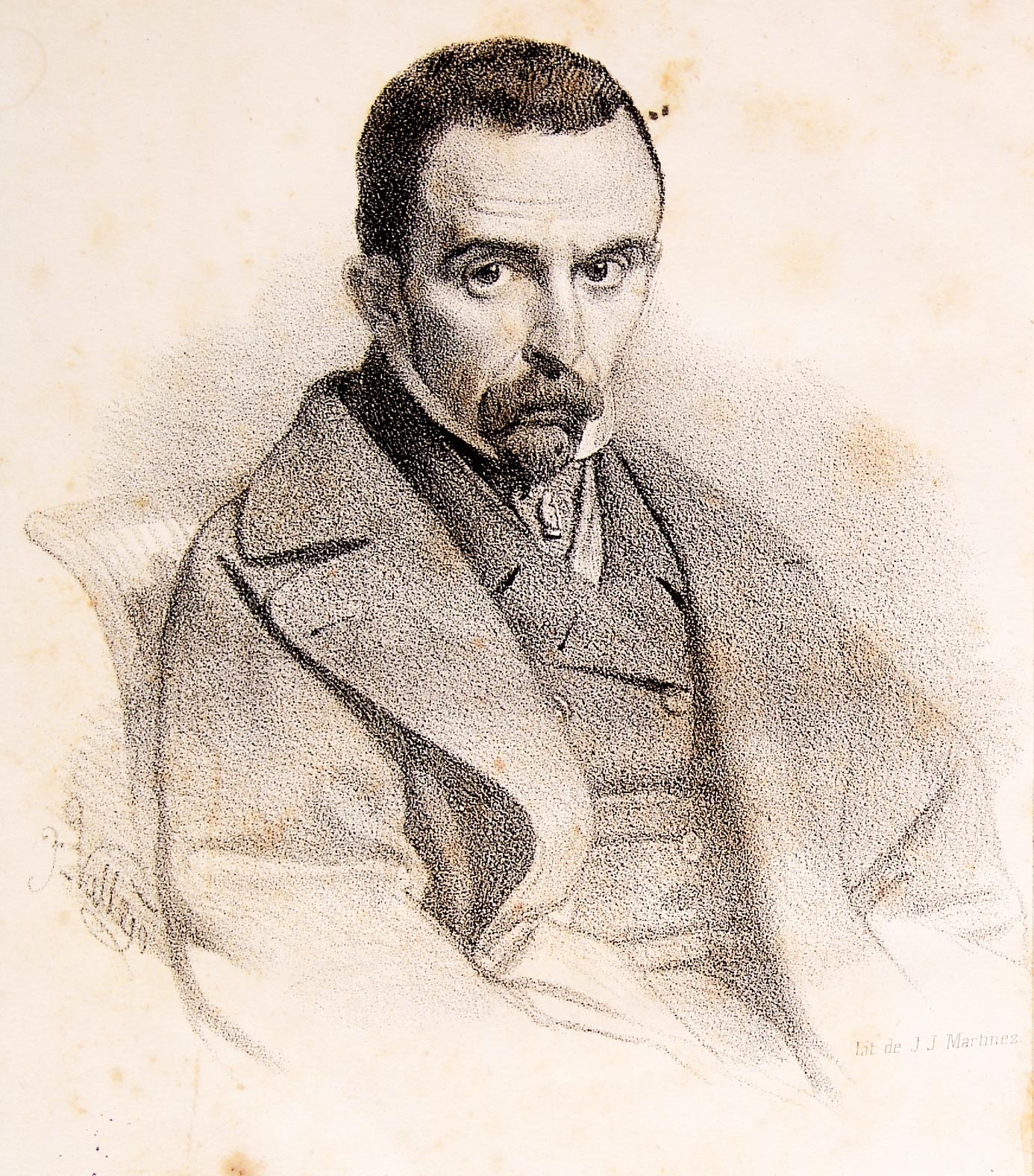
- Born: 4 October 1821; Isla Cristina (Spain)
- Died: 2 July 1885 (aged 63); Madrid (Spain)

Roque Barcia Martí (Isla Cristina 4 October 1821–Madrid 2 July 1885) was a Spanish writer and republican politician belonging first to the Democratic Party and then, during the Sexenio Democrático (the Spanish Glorious Revolutionary period of 1868–1874), to the Republican Federal Party. He served as a deputy in the Cortes in 1869, 1871, and 1873, as a senator in 1872, and was a leading figure in the Cantón de Cartagena uprising.

== Biography ==
=== Early life ===
He was born on 4 October 1821. He was the fourth child and second son of the Galician Roque Barcia Ferraces de la Cueva, an official in the tax and customs administration and a scrivener with progressive social ideas, an hidalgo with a family home in the hamlet of Piñeiro in San Miguel de Cora (A Estrada, Pontevedra), and his second wife Teresa Martí Duboy, daughter of the mayor of the nearby town of Redondela, where the family owned property.

During his childhood, he lived in the sandy area of Isla Cristina, frequented by fishermen, and in the town of La Redondela (currently part of Isla Cristina) in the Province of Huelva. Reading the works of Nicolò Donato had made Roque's father a liberal at a very young age, unlike Roque's older paternal uncle, the physician Juan Ramón Barcia Ferraces de la Cueva, a fierce defender of Throne and Altar who eventually became a Carlist. By contrast, ideas of the social pact, general will, and the human being as a free, autonomous individual with rights were always familiar to Roque's father. Consequently, during the Trienio Constitucional (1820–1823), he was a member of the patriotic society known as the Confederación de Caballeros Comuneros, and, when it split in 1823, he joined the group of moderate dissenters who formed the Asamblea constituyente de Comuneros Españoles Constitucionales in Madrid. With the restoration of absolutism by Ferdinand VII, anti-liberal persecution began that same year, forcing him briefly into exile in Portugal; he resumed his patriotic activities publicly from 1834 onward, after the death of the king and thus the end of the Ominous Decade, shortly before his own death in 1838. He had published several essays of what would later be called a kind of “early regenerationism” on the fishing and salt industries.

At age nine, Roque was kicked in the face by a horse, which crushed the right side of his lower jaw and most likely fractured his skull as well. The irregular shape of his face, his slightly nasal speech, and his deafness may all have been aftereffects of this accident, which also probably delayed his schooling. After finally completing his initial education, Roque went with his brother Nicolás to Madrid in 1837, during the First Carlist War, to study Law alongside his father, who died the following year. He then moved to Redondela and continued his studies there with the help of the very learned local parish priest, José Miravent, whose nephews married Roque's sisters. He ultimately returned to finish his Jurisprudence degree at the University of Seville, arriving there on 24 October 1842.

=== Grand Tour and early literary work ===
He then embarked on the standard grand tour of a young man of means, spending several years abroad: he was in Montpellier and Livorno in 1848, and in Rome and Ferrara in 1849. Italy made a deep impression on him. He conducted research in libraries in both France and Italy for what later became El progreso y el cristianismo (Progress and Christianity), a work on which he labored a total of ten years. He also compiled a Nuevo diccionario de la lengua castellana arreglado según la última edición aumentado con unas veinte mil voces usuales en ciencias, artes y oficios... published in Girona (1853). But it was El progreso y el cristianismo that caused his first exile in Paris, and, in 1858, not only was the book banned but many thousands of copies were publicly burned. A similar fate befell his Historia de los Estados-Unidos de América, no copies of which survived—not even the 80 copies he kept at home, which was searched by police. After returning to Spain, he wrote for various newspapers and gained wide popularity. He wrote four volumes of travel accounts and a well-received work titled Un paseo por París (A Stroll Through Paris). He then edited the newspaper El Círculo Científico y Literario in Madrid until the Spanish Revolution of 1854 erupted, a revolution in which he helped spread the democratic ideals he ardently championed. During this time, he also released La cuestión pontificia (The Papal Question) and La verdad social (Social Truth), which were similarly banned. He was already working on his ambitious lexicographical and etymological project, publishing successive installments, as well as La filosofía del alma humana (Philosophy of the Human Soul) and two volumes of Sinónimos castellanos (Castilian Synonyms) as a complement to his Nuevo diccionario.

Two further works, Historia de los Estados-Unidos and Catón político, suffered the usual fate of Barcia's political writings: government bans. Undeterred, he published Las armonías morales y el nuevo pensamiento de la nación (Moral Harmonies and the New Thought of the Nation), which met the same outcome. Barcia aimed his works at educating the public, while the government banned them to keep people in what he saw as perpetual ignorance of ideas of social regeneration.

=== Journalism ===
Influenced by Emilio Castelar, in whose newspaper La Democracia (Madrid) (1864) he worked as an editor, he moved that same year to Cádiz and ran a newspaper founded by the anarchist from Cádiz, Fermín Salvochea, and financed by, among others, the republican businessman Manuel Francisco Paúl y Picardo titled El Demócrata Andaluz, which lasted five months. His articles earned him excommunication by the bishop of Cádiz—only one of many excommunications he received during his lifetime. He responded to that excommunication with his Teoría del infierno (Theory of Hell).

Barcia only stayed about two years in Cádiz before moving on to Isla Cristina—his house in La Redondela still stands—where, after the serious developments of the 1866 coup d’état, his home was raided four times, a detention and search warrant was issued for him, and multiple searches took place. Consequently, he chose exile in Portugal, where he was arrested twice but presided over the Junta de Exiliados Españoles (Committee of Spanish Exiles). During that exile, he turned down several overtures from the Duke of Montpensier.

He participated actively in the preparation of the 1868 revolution, known as “La Gloriosa,” drafting documents and proclamations. The revolutionary idea of September 1868 germinated not only in Barcelona but also in Andalusia and particularly in Cádiz, where the Fourierism of Joaquín de Abreu y Orta, the events of the Mano Negra (chronicled by Leopoldo Alas, "Clarín"), and the internationalist activities of figures like Fermín Salvochea had already stirred the public. Barcia was offered no fewer than sixteen candidacies to the Cortes elections and was eventually elected deputy for Badajoz. The proposed Constitution did not satisfy him.

=== Revolutionary work ===
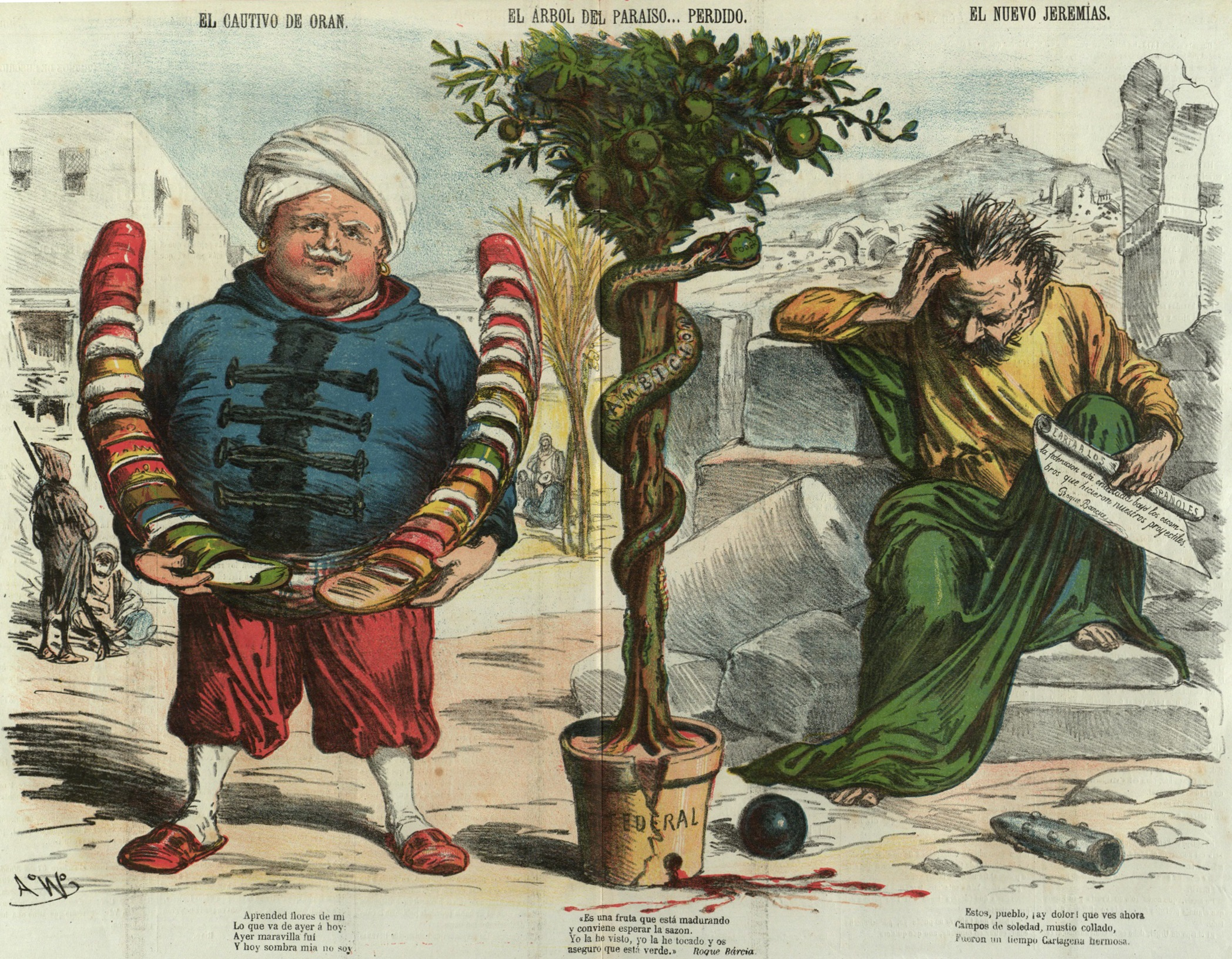
Caricature by Tomás Padró Pedret for the magazine El Lío (August 1874), depicting the fate of the federal "intransigents" Juan Contreras y Román and Roque Barcia after the cantonal insurrection, alongside the Spanish Draft Constitution of 1873, personified as the tree of paradise: Contreras is shown selling babouches in exile in Algerian Oran; Barcia as “the new Jeremías” amid the ruins of the Cartagena Artillery Depot, now turning his pen against the Cantonal movement he had previously defended; and, finally, the federal tree, mortally wounded by a bullet.

Barcia reemerged in Madrid at the time of the Central Revolutionary Committee (Junta Central Revolucionaria) in the orbit of Francisco Pi y Margall. He refused to sign the agreement that vested supreme power in the Regent, and, after attending two sessions and seeing that the Junta's resolutions were not in line with his ideas, he left it. He was soon imprisoned in the well-known Madrid jail of El Saladero, accused—undoubtedly without basis—of involvement in the assassination of General Prim, an allegation that sparked an intense and grandiloquent written campaign by Barcia, who defended himself indignantly through the newspaper La Igualdad, where he was then an editor.

He played a crucial organizing role in the Cantonal rebellion, eventually serving as head of the Cantón de Cartagena. When Cartagena fell on 12 January 1874, he did not flee on the frigate Numancia along with the rest of the members of the “Junta de Salvación Pública,” who sailed for Oran in French Algeria. However, only four days after the fall of Cartagena, he published a statement in the newspapers condemning the cantonal rebellion, even though he had been one of its main leaders and instigators. In this exculpatory text, he presented a series of falsehoods—such as “I was in Cartagena because they wouldn’t let me leave” and that he had been “a prisoner, more of the besieged than of the besiegers.” He then proceeded to condemn the cantonal revolt and its leaders:

"All my comrades are very holy, very just, very heroic, but they are not fit to govern a village. [...] Federal Republicans: let us not insist, for now, on implementing federalism. It is an idea still in its infancy. [...] Without renouncing my ideas, being who I always was, I acknowledge the current government and will stand with it in its struggle against absolutism."

These two articles were published beginning on 21 January in several newspapers, but they were dated 16 and 17 January, renouncing the Cartagena junta and calling for the restoration of order and peace. On 18 January, he wrote a third article disowning any responsibility for distributing funds, on the 19th he composed a fourth exculpatory article, and later a manifesto dated 14 January.

According to José Barón Fernández, after writing all this, "Roque Barcia was discredited forever as a politician" and "turned into what we commonly refer to as a demagogue."

=== Later life and political legacy ===
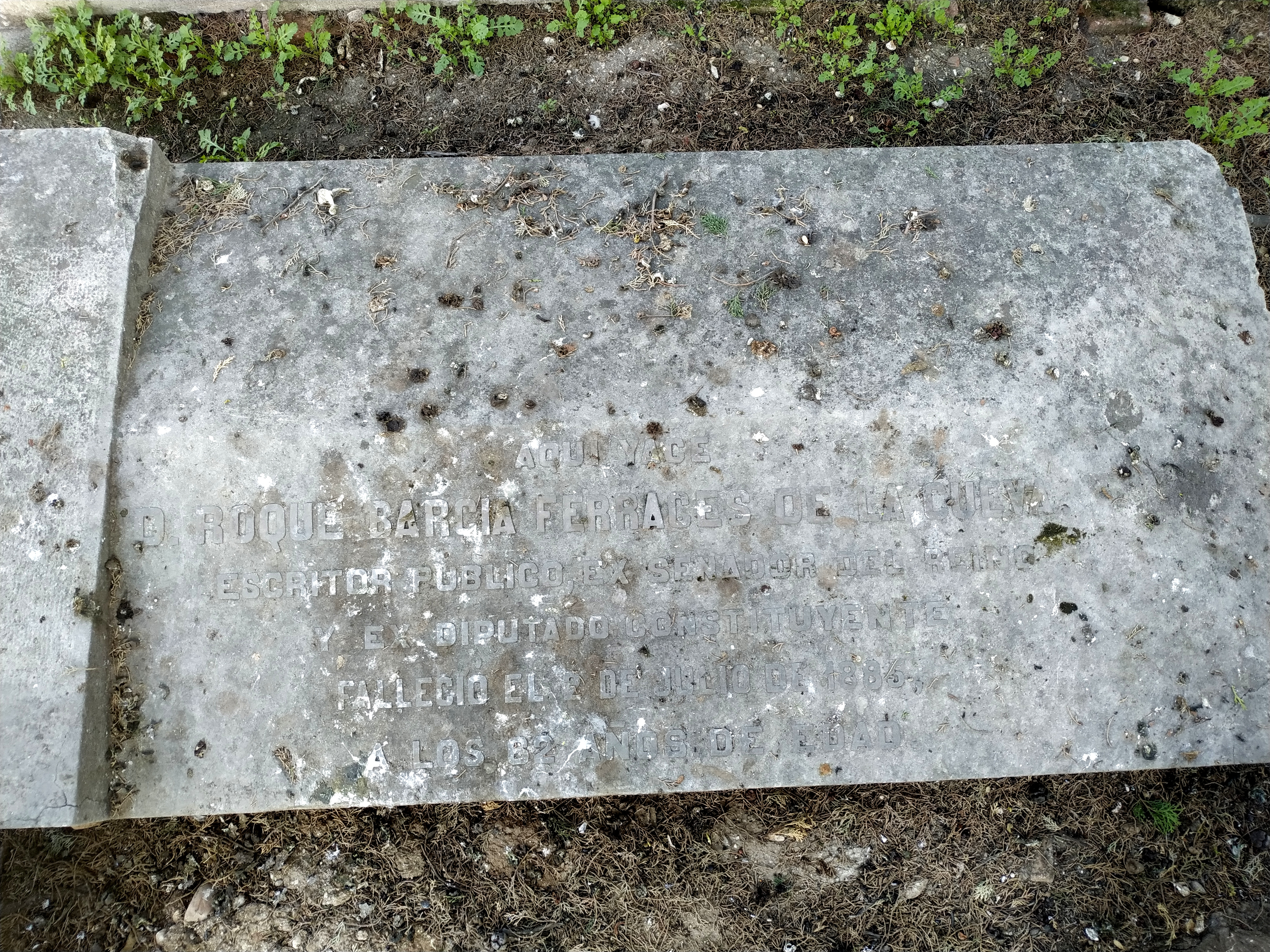
Roque Barcia's tomb in Madrid, bearing his father's surname.

He died on 2 July 1885 in Madrid and was buried in the Sacramental de San Lorenzo y San José cemetery.

He lived for several years in exile in France, dedicating himself to literature and permanently withdrawing from politics after the start of the Restoration. He eventually returned to Spain.

His biographer Ester García, aside from acknowledging his significant work as a lexicographer, summed up his political persona as follows: "His notable popularity as a public figure—an evangelist of the people—contrasts with his complete inability to adapt his prophetic social persona to the spaces of political execution and negotiation. This is readily apparent in his troubled relationship with parliamentary politics but also in how unsettling his eccentric character was among the party’s elites."

== Works and Thought ==
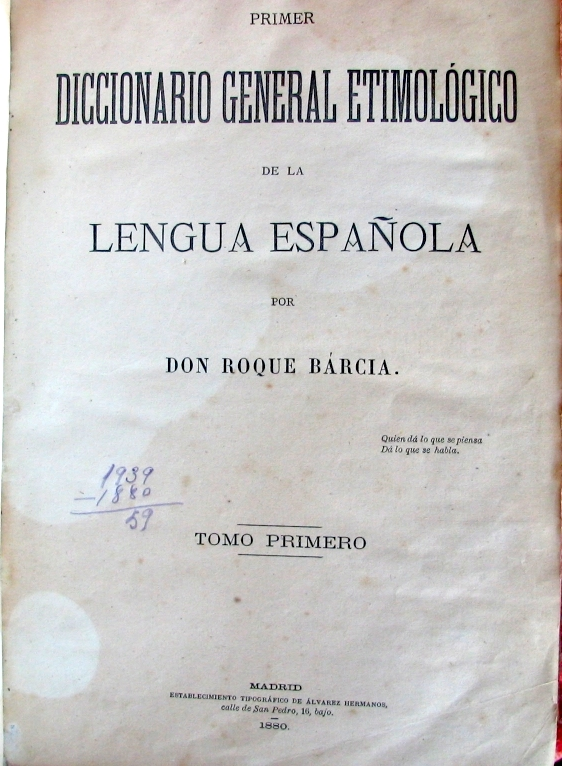
Cover of the Primer diccionario general etimológico (1880).

Barcia was also an etymologist, author of the first (not without some eccentricities, given the difficulty of the task) Diccionario General Etimológico de la Lengua Española in five volumes, as well as an early Diccionario de Sinónimos (Dictionary of Synonyms) almost as widely circulated as his 1864 Catón Político (Political Cato). As a man of letters, his output—some plays and novels inspired by Victor Hugo and Vittorio Alfieri—is considered mediocre. He is said to have been excommunicated around sixty times during his life, on par with José Nakens or Fernando Lozano Montes. Indeed, his voracious reading, which led him to a Greco-Oriental eclecticism and a brand of Hegelianism with some Krausist overtones, repeatedly provoked condemnation by the ecclesiastical hierarchy, which ordered the removal of some of his books from circulation, and attracted the scathing criticism of the integrist canon Vicente Manterola and the famous Catholic apologist, Dr. Francisco Mateos Gago.

As to his philosophy, he was undeniably a pantheist: "The thought of God became incarnate in the mystery of the universe, in the genesis of all beings, in the harmony of that nature that astounds us." And elsewhere: "God is nothing but universal reason, the sublime word spelled out on the lips of the great harmony, as much in the flowers of the field as in the stars of the night." Two central concepts shape both his philosophical ideas and his political activism: the indefinite progress of humanity and the individual's freedom, both underpinned by faith—an immense faith, unbounded, capable of reaching the infinite, and accountable to no one: "One must have faith, an inexhaustible faith, powerful, invincible; an absolute faith in humanity’s future, even if we do not see that future or this faith." In his view, progress was guaranteed, because for Barcia the unity of ideas was based on the unity of essence; beings are modifications of being, and ideas are partial expressions of the idea, ensuring the systematization of knowledge and an all-encompassing presence of understanding. Likewise, individual liberty was essential for integrating into the whole and participating in humanity, the divine counterpart of the infinite God.

Consistent with these principles, he rejected the then-prevailing social and political structures—namely, the monarchy, property, and Catholic Church—as he believed them to be detrimental to Spain's future, although he never declared himself an atheist, instead taking a position that Menéndez Pelayo described as akin to a liberal form of Protestantism: "I do not want the cold reason of Luther or Calvin… I, a son of Jesus Christ, son of His Cross and His Word; I, Jesus Christ as belief and as history, I want the religion I adore to open a trial against those who call themselves its doctors, that they be measured from head to foot by the Christian feeling."
