= Petroleum Revolution =

Workers' revolution in Alcoy, Spain in 1873

- Part of the Sexenio Democrático
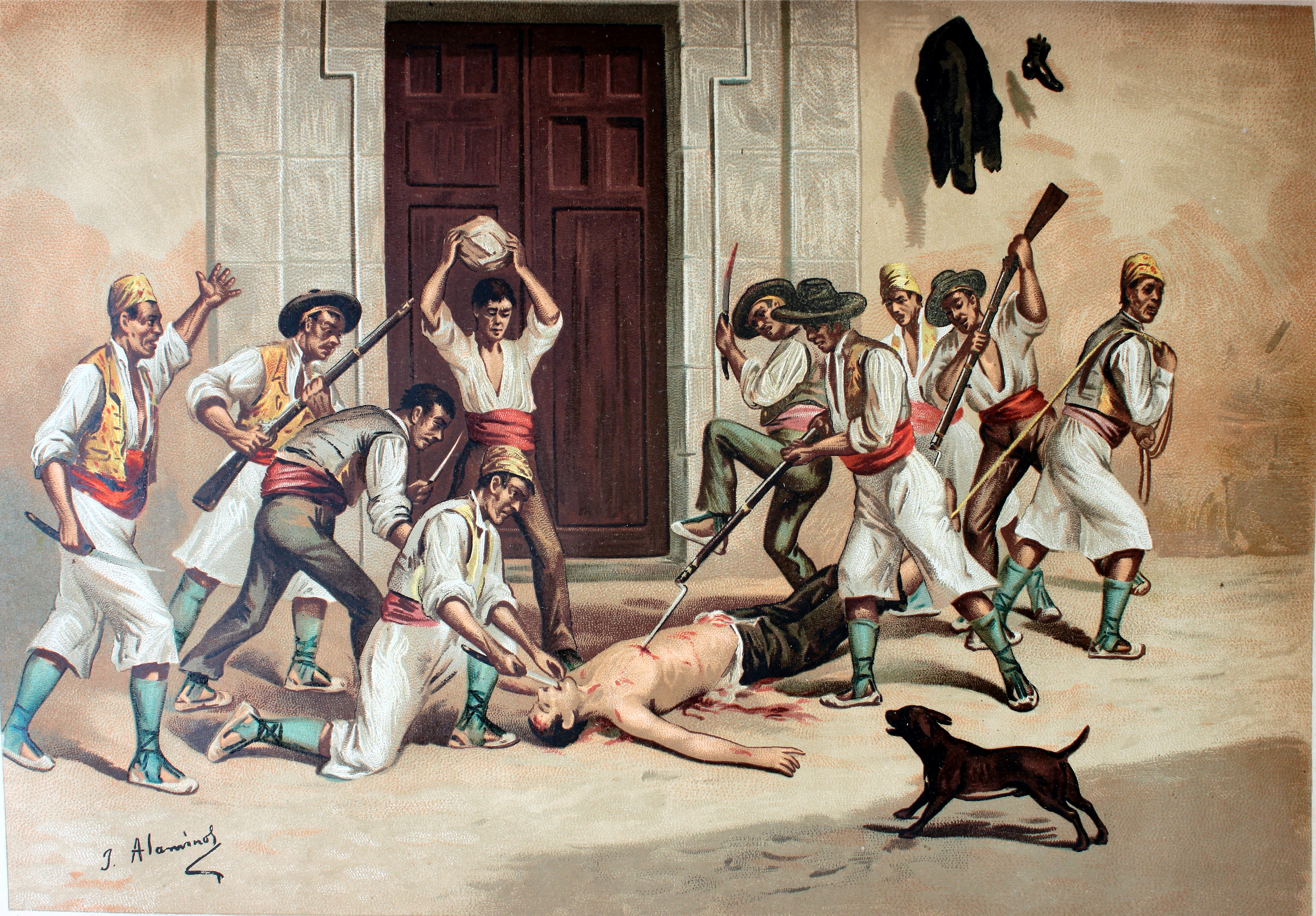
- Murder of Agustí Albors, the mayor of Alcoy
Date	9 July– 13 July 1873
Location	Alcoy, Spain
Result	Victory of the Spanish republican government.

Belligerents
First Spanish Republic: Alcoy City Hall	Committee of Public Safety; Spanish Regional Federation of the IWA

Commanders and leaders
Emilio Castelar; Agustí Albors †	Severino Albarracín

The Petroleum Revolution (Valencian: La Revolució del Petroli) was a libertarian and syndicalist leaning workers' revolution that took place in Alcoy, Alicante, Spain in 1873. The event derives its name from the petroleum-soaked torches carried by revolting workers. During those days, according to chroniclers, the city stank of petroleum.

This situation placed the city of Alcoy on the frontlines of the social conflicts of this era, due to the poor situation of the workers, who organised themselves and were pioneers in the establishment of the International Workingmen's Association (AIT) in Spain. During the revolution, workers seized control of the city for several days in July 1873 in the course of a general strike, which eventually became a riot, against the republican mayor Agustí Albors (better known as Pelletes). During the revolt, Albors gave the order to fire on demonstrators, who defended themselves by assaulting the town hall, executing the mayor, and trapping the rest of the municipal leadership in the building.

The city and was governed from 9–13 July 1873 by a "Committee of Public Safety," presided over by Severino Albarracín. The demonstrators declared a series of pay raises and a reduction of the working day. The revolt ended with the intervention of the federal army and the military occupation of the city, hefty repression against the revolutionaries, and practically no improvements for the labouring class. More than 600 workers were put on trial, including minors between 12 and 17 years of age. Many of the accused were condemned to death.

== Background ==
During the First Spanish Republic, Alcoy was one of the few Spanish cities where the Industrial Revolution had taken root. The city was occupied by paper, textile, and metallurgic industries that had engendered a great upswing in population and the implementation of a capitalist system of production, as well as introduced mechanization as a substitute for much formerly manual labour. This provoked the appearance of Luddite movements that began to destroy the machinery, in vindication and defense of the working class. A third of Alcoy's 30,000 inhabitants, including women and children, worked in industry — 5,500 in 175 textile companies and 2,500 in 74 paper industries. Their living conditions were very harsh, as evidenced by the fact that 42% of the children died in Alcoy before they were five years old. This largely explains the extraordinary growth of the Spanish Regional Federation of the International Workingmen's Association (FRE-AIT), which at the end of 1872 already had more than 2,000 members, almost a quarter of the city's workers.

In the Córdoba Congress of the FRE-AIT, held between December 15, 1872 and January 3, 1873 and in which the "authoritarian" (Marxist) resolutions of the Hague Congress were rejected and the "anti-authoritarian" (anarchist) resolutions of the Saint-Imier Congress were approved, it was decided to abolish the Federal Council and replace it with a Correspondence and Statistics Commission that would be based precisely in Alcoy and that would be made up of Severino Albarracín (primary school teacher), Francisco Tomás (bricklayer), Miguel Pino (adjuster, from Ciudad Real) and Vicente Fombuena (foundry, from Alcoy).

After the proclamation of the First Spanish Republic on February 11, 1873, a local assembly of the FRE-AIT held on March 2 discussed the attitude to be adopted after the regime change, which was reflected in the minutes of the Federal Commission:

A comrade [possibly Severino Albarracín, according to Avilés Farré] clearly and conclusively demonstrated that the change in the policy of the middle class was only in the name of the institutions, but that deep down they continued to be the same, constant hindrances to the progress of liberty and justice. Therefore, it was necessary to activate the propaganda and the organization proclaimed by the International Association, organized independently of all the bourgeois parties and the only one that can lend sufficient force to destroy when deemed appropriate all the institutions and privileges of the present bourgeois society, and the revolutionary organization of the proletariat outside any authoritarian organization led by the bourgeoisie; or what is the same, the arming of the workers without belonging to the bourgeois militias, in order to be ready for what might happen. A great round of applause demonstrated the Assembly's agreement with the ideas expressed ...

On March 9, a demonstration in which about ten thousand people participated crossed the streets of Alcoy and culminated in a rally held in the bullring, in which it was unanimously approved to request an increase in wages and a decrease in hours work.

== Events ==
According to Josep Termes, with the proclamation of the Federal Republic, on June 8, the Federal Commission of the FRE-AIT concluded that it was time to unleash the social revolution. On June 15, it asked the workers to "organize and prepare for the revolutionary action of the proletariat in order to destroy all the privileges that authoritarian powers support and promote." On July 6, Tomás González Morago, member of the Commission, in a letter addressed to the Belgian Federation announced the imminent social revolution that was going to be unleashed in Spain.

On July 7, the Commission called an assembly of the city's workers in the bullring. There it was agreed to start a general strike the following day to achieve a 20% increase in wages and a reduction of the working day from 12 to 8 hours. The strike began on July 8 and as Severino Albarracín, member of the Federal Committee, communicated to the Valencia Federation by letter, they were ready "to win in any way and to resort to all available means, even by force if necessary." V. Fambuena, also a member of the Commission, expressed himself in the same way in a letter sent to the Buñol section - "We are today in a general strike of workers, that together number 10,000, ready to face everything that comes our way," he wrote, whose members he encouraged to work "in favor of our cause without rest to arrive soon at the day of Social Liquidation."

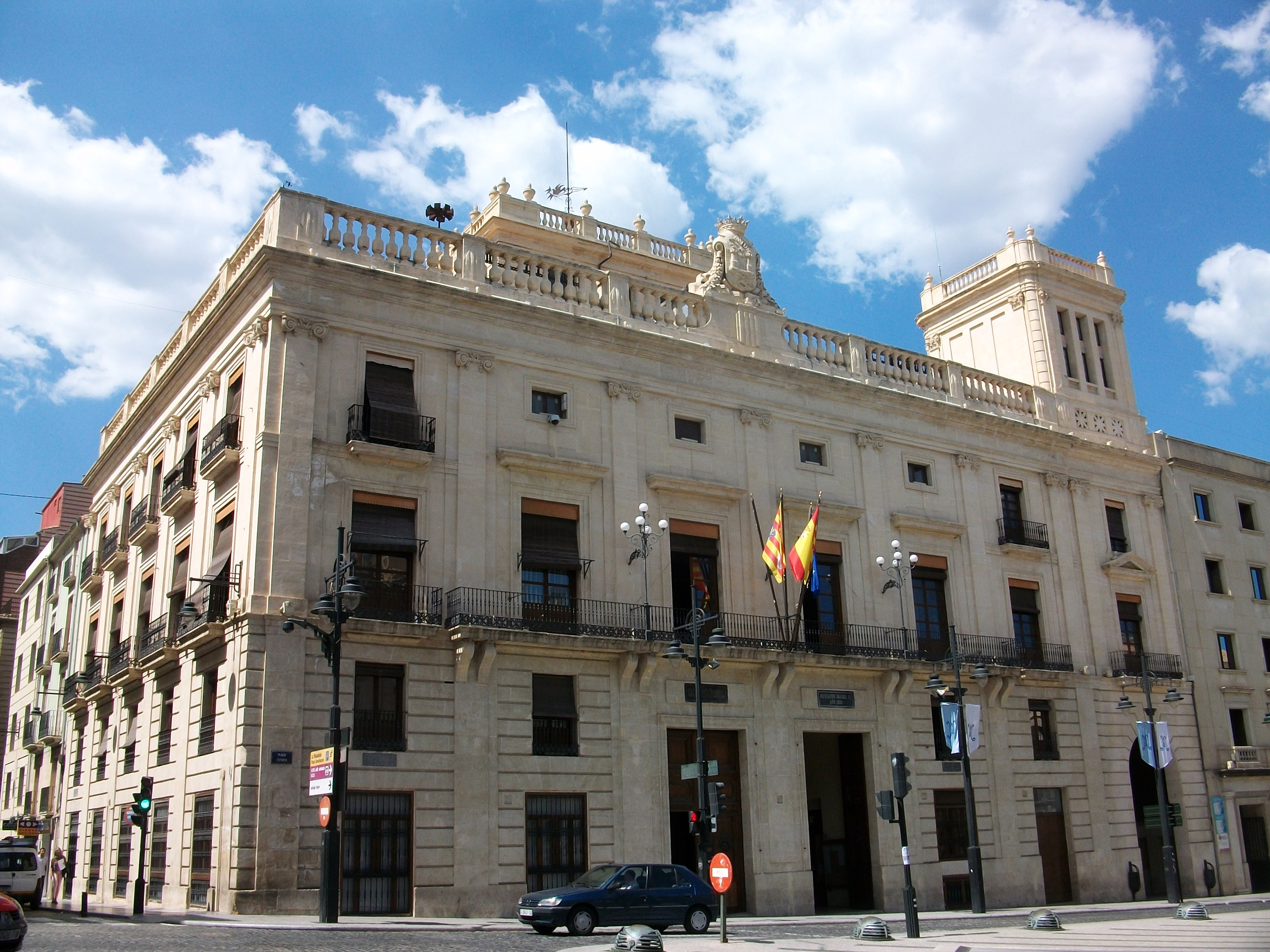
Alcoy City Hall building, burned down during the Petroleum Revolution.

On July 9, the manufacturers, meeting in the town hall, rejected the workers' demands as exaggerated, finding the support of the mayor, the Federal Republican Agustí Albors. Then the workers demanded the resignation of the mayor and his replacement by a revolutionary junta made up of the Federal Committee of the International. When they were gathered in the Plaza de la República — or Plaza de San Agustín — in front of the City Hall, waiting for the result of the meeting that Albors and the members of the Commission were holding, the municipal guard by order of Albors fired at them causing one death and several wounded. The workers dispersed, but then responded by taking up arms and taking over the streets. They detained several owners — more than a hundred, according to some sources — whom they took hostage; they would later release them after paying a ransom to pay for the strike; they also set fire to some factories. Mayor Albors and 32 guards stood in the City Hall waiting for the arrival of the reinforcements that they had requested from the Government, but after twenty hours of siege during which the building and other neighboring buildings were burned, they had to capitulate, with Mayor Albors dying violently in the skirmish — according to other versions, Albors had managed to flee, being located shortly after and assassinated — and fifteen more people also died, including seven guards and three internationalists. According to the proceedings, there were fifteen victims: thirteen caused by the insurgents — Mayor Albors; four civilians; a civil guard; and seven municipal guards, three of them killed after surrendering — and two by the guards.

The members of the International Commission fled Alcoy on the night of July 12 and took refuge in Madrid. From there Francisco Tomás in a later letter, dated September 15, differentiated the Alcoy insurrection, "a purely revolutionary socialist workers' movement", from the cantonal rebellion, a "purely political and bourgeois" movement.

Immediately, different accounts of the "atrocities of the revolutionaries" were disseminated, which forced the Federal Committee to deny them through a manifesto made public on July 14:

Beings thrown from the balcony, priests hanged from lanterns, men drenched in oil and shot to death in flight, heads of civilians cut off and paraded through the streets, arson of buildings, burning and destruction of the town hall, rape of innocent girls, all these hoaxes are horrible slander.

After the events, a strong repression was unleashed. Between 500 and 700 workers were arrested and 282 of them ended up being prosecuted. According to the historian Manuel Tuñón de Lara, the repression began after the formation of the new government of Emilio Castelar to replace that of Nicolás Salmerón. At the beginning of September an investigating judge appeared in Alcoy accompanied by 200 civil guards, who proceeded to arrest hundreds of workers, many of whom were taken to Alicante. In 1876 an amnesty released quite a few of the defendants from prison, and in 1881 there was a second amnesty. In 1887 the last twenty defendants were acquitted, six of whom were still in prison, fourteen years after the events. "Justice was able to clarify the facts, but could not reliably identify the culprits."

Those events broke the collaboration agreements between the republicans and anarchists, and gave the Marxists room to criticise the anarchists directing the workers' movement. Friedrich Engels himself put grim criticism in his 1873 mémoir on the Bakunists' role in the Spanish uprising.

== In popular culture ==
The writer Isabel-Clara Simó in her novel Julia (1983) narrates the history of Julia, a girl obliged to work in a fabric mill in Alcoy after her father's death in prison as a result of participating in the Petroleum Revolution.

== The impact of the Alcoy revolt in Portugal ==
In Portugal, the non-working-class press will portray the Alcoy revolt as a revolution of savages and will accuse the International and internationalism of terror and violence.Throughout the entire month of August 1873, it is evident in the public sphere a strong fear of seeing Lisbon transformed into a new Alcoy. In Lisbon, various fires are reported in the Portuguese capital, and immediately, Portuguese internationalists are accused of staging a revolt similar to what had happened in Alcoy. These accusations are denied by the Portuguese socialists who, although committed to Marx's faction, still support and defend the anarchists of Alcoy.

== See also ==
- Revolución Cantonal
- Syndicalist

== Bibliography ==
- Avilés Farré, Juan (2013). La daga y la dinamita. Los anarquistas y el nacimiento del terrorismo (in Spanish). Barcelona: Tusquets Editores. ISBN 978-84-8383-753-5.
- Cerdá, Manuel (1988). "Las clases trabajadoras. La I Internacional". Historia del pueblo valenciano (in Spanish). Valencia: Levante. pp. 715–724. ISBN 84-404-3763-3.
- Fondo documental de la Biblioteca Arús
- Gabriel, Pere, Socialisme, lliurepensament i cientifisme (1860-1890), Barcelona, Edicions 62.
- Lázaro, João (2024). Na teia da aranha. Debate público, mobilização e internacionalismo no movimento operário português (1865-1877), Portugal, Edições Afrontamento. ISBN 978-972-36-2016-0.
- Termes, Josep (1977). Anarquismo y sindicalismo en España. La Primera Internacional (1864-1881) (in Spanish). Barcelona: Crítica. ISBN 84-7423-023-3.
- Tuñón de Lara, Manuel (1977). El movimiento obrero en la historia de España. I.1832-1899 (in Spanish) (2nd ed.). Barcelona: Laia. ISBN 84-7222-331-0.
