= Coup d'état of Pavía =

Military coup in Spain in 1874

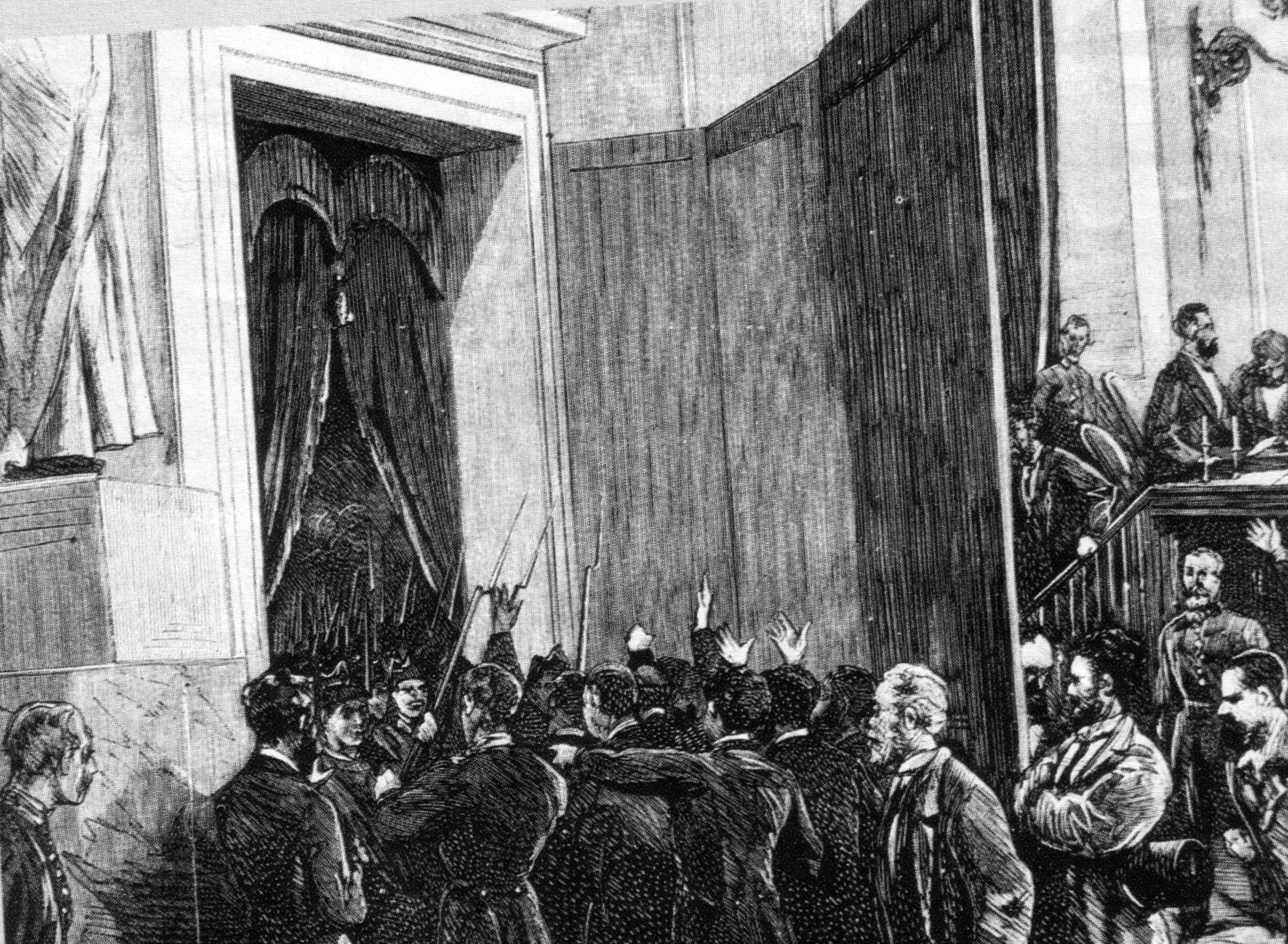
- Illustration of Pavia's troops entering the Congress of Deputies
- Native name: Golpe de Estado de Pavía
- Date: 3 January 1874
- Location: Congress of Deputies, Madrid, Spain; 40°24′57″N 3°41′48″W
- Type: Coup d'état

The coup d'état of Pavía (Spanish: Golpe de Estado de Pavía), or more simply Pavía's coup, was a military coup d'état initiated by General Manuel Pavía y Rodríguez de Alburquerque on 3 January 1874, during the First Spanish Republic. As a result, Spain transitioned from a democratic government to an authoritarian one.

== Background ==
The Spanish Republic had been formed in February 1873 during the turbulent period of Spanish history known as the Sexenio Democrático. The Spanish parliament, the Cortes Generales, had been fractured throughout 1873 and consensus between the moderates, centrists, and intransigents could not be reached. National unity was of particular concern to many members of Cortes as there were two simultaneous revolts in Spain: the conservative Carlist uprising in northern Spain and the socialist Cantonal rebellion in southern Spain. Emilio Castelar, a political moderate, had been President of the Executive Power since 7 September 1873 and had suspended the Cortes on 20 September in order to take more effective control of the military. With worsening situations on both fronts, Castelar called for the Cortes to reconvene on 2 January 1874, in an effort to seek unlimited powers.

== Coup ==
General Pavia, a supporter of President Castelar, positioned his troops across from the Congress of Deputies in Madrid on 2 January in anticipation of the deputies reconvening. Shortly after midnight, in the early morning of 3 January, a vote of confidence took place and Castelar's government lost with 100 votes of support against 120 votes opposed. A new vote was then held to elect a new President of the Executive and when it appeared that the radicals in the Cortes (the "intransigents") were preparing to elect the avowed republican Eduardo Palanca Asensi, Pavia ordered his troops to surround the Cortes and request the session be dissolved. Former president Nicolás Salmerón y Alonso was presiding over the vote and remained in the Cortes with other deputies until Pavia's forces entered by force. At 6:55am on 3 January the deputies were vacated from the building without any casualties. Pavia offered the presidency to Castelar who refused due to the despotic nature of the morning's events. Instead, Pavia recruited former prime minister Francisco Serrano who had been in exile in France following a previous failed coup attempt in April 1873. Serrano was markedly anti-republican and did not support the Cortes during the first republic, and he officially dissolved the Cortes on 8 January 1874.

== Aftermath ==
Pavia's coup on 3 January effectively marked the end of the Spanish Republic, although it would continue to exist in name until 29 December 1874 when the Bourbon monarchy was peacefully restored in Spain. In the intervening time, Serrano operated a de facto military dictatorship during which time opposition was suppressed.
