= Spanish Draft Constitution of 1873 =

Proposed constitution of Spain

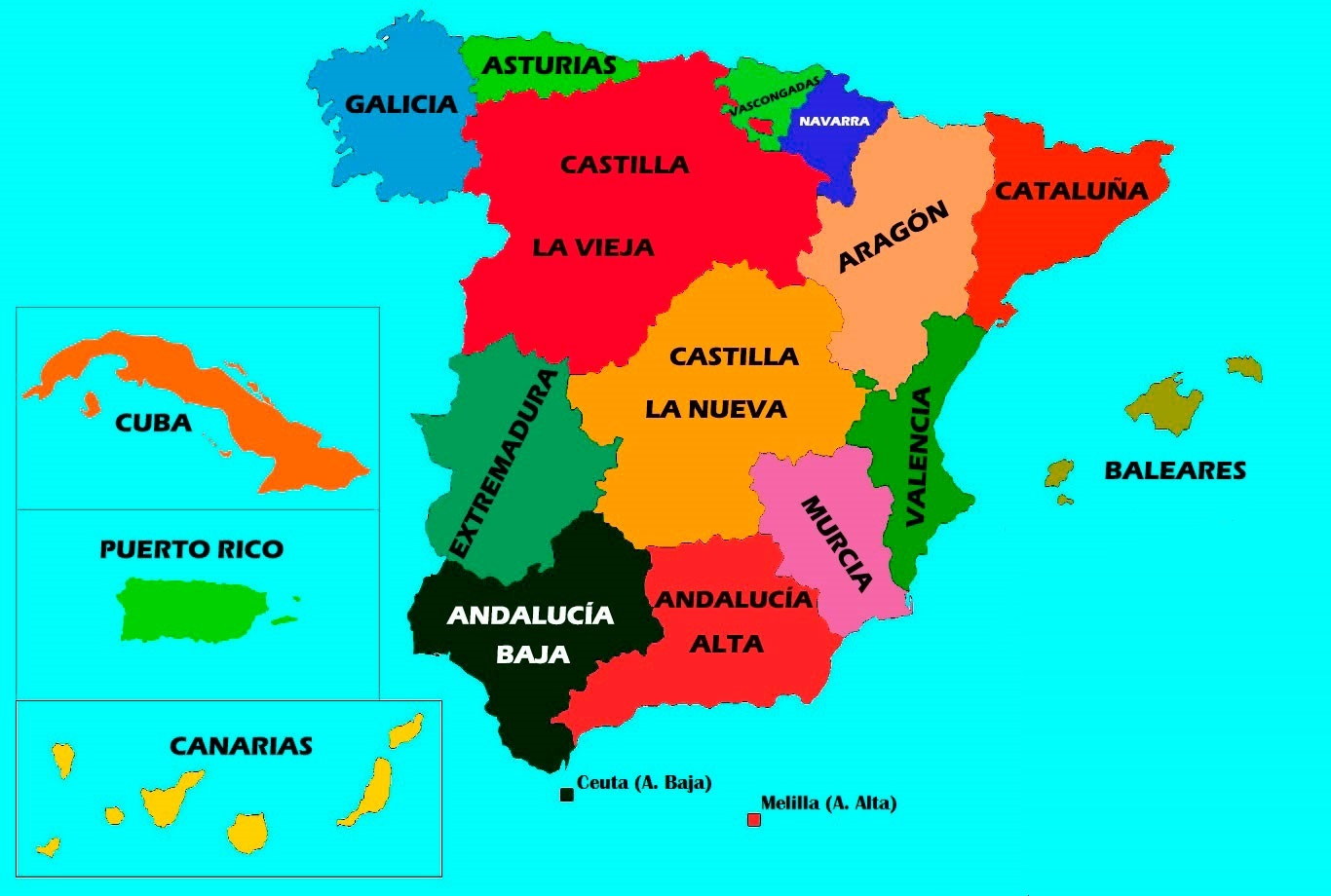
States that make up the Spanish nation according to the draft Federal Constitution of 1873. The map reflects neither the Captaincy General of the Philippines nor the territories in Africa, but only the regions that would have constituted fully-fledged federated states.

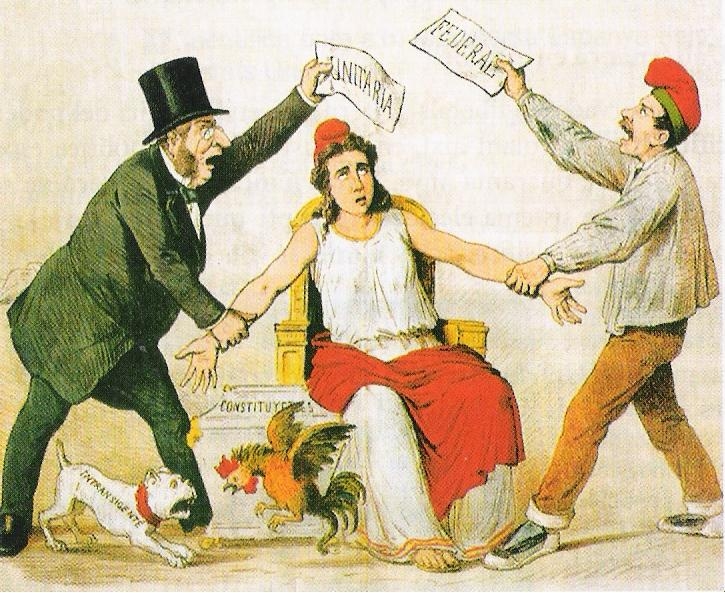
Caricature from the satirical magazine La Flaca of March 3, 1873 about the struggle between the radicals, who defend the unitary republic, and the federal republicans who defend the federal republic. And also on the struggle between the compromising and intransigent federals.

The Spanish Draft Constitution of 1873 was intended to regulate the First Spanish Republic. It was written mainly by Emilio Castelar, who intended to transform Spain from a unitary state into a federation but the project failed to gain the approval by Parliament.

The draft planned to divide the federation into seventeen states: Andalucía Alta ("Upper Andalusia"), Andalucía Baja ("Lower Andalusia"), Aragón, Asturias, Baleares (Balearic Islands), Canarias (Canary Islands), Castilla la Nueva ("New Castile"), Castilla la Vieja ("Old Castile"), Cataluña ("Catalonia"), Cuba, Extremadura, Galicia, Murcia, Navarra, Puerto Rico, Valencia and Regiones Vascongadas ("Basque Provinces"). Following the creation of these states, it is also stated that the territories of the Philippine Islands, Fernando Poo, Annobón, Corisco, and the establishments of Africa shall be elevated to the status of States by the "public Powers" "in accordance to the progression" of these territories.

== Bibliography ==
- Pérez Ayala, Andoni (1999). "La I República, marco político y proyecto constitucional" (pdf). Revista de Estudios Políticos (105): 29–71. ISSN 0048-7694.

https://www.cervantesvirtual.com/obra-visor/proyecto-de-constitucion-federal-de-17-de-julio-1873/html/9f16f016-8564-4c4f-89e0-fbb00501b644_2.html
