= Cantonal Rebellion =

Federalist insurrection in Spain in 1873

Cantonal Revolution
- Foci of cantonal uprising and main battles (over current borders)
Date	12 July 1873 – 3 January 1874
Location	Spain
Result	Rebellion suppressed: Federal Democratic Republican Party removed from power; Restoration of the monarchy of Spain

Belligerents
Cantonalists; Internationalists	Spanish Republic

Commanders and leaders
Juan Contreras y Román; Antonio Gálvez Arce	Nicolás Salmerón; Arsenio Martínez Campos; Manuel Pavía

The Cantonal Revolution (Spanish: Revolución cantonal) (Note: Also known as the Cantonal Rebellion, Cantonal Insurrection, Cantonal Revolt, Cantonal Uprising and Cantonal Rising; or Cantonalist Revolution, Cantonalist Rebellion, Cantonalist Insurrection, Cantonalist Revolt, Cantonalist Uprising and Cantonalist Rising.) was an attempt to establish a revolutionary republic, based on a decentralised system of cantons, in Spain in 1873.

Following the Glorious Revolution of 1868, Spain was thrown into political instability which culminated in the establishment of the First Spanish Republic. The Federal Democratic Republican Party (PRDF), led by Francesc Pi i Margall, was elected to reconstitute the country as a federal republic, but internal divisions within the party led to further conflict. Left-wing "intransigent" republicans advocated for the formation of the federal republic from the bottom-up, rather than the top-down constitution proposed by the Pi i Margall government.

On 17 July 1873, intransigents in Cartagena established the Canton of Cartagena, aiming to transform the country into a federal republic based on the model of the cantons of Switzerland. Cantons were established throughout southern and eastern Spain, where government forces had little presence due to the ongoing Carlist War in the north. The Pi i Margall government collapsed and was replaced by the political moderate Nicolás Salmerón, who sought to put down the uprising. Members of the International Workingmen's Association (IWA) also joined the uprising, with the aim of escalating the political revolution into a social revolution. By the following year, the rebellion was suppressed by the forces of Manuel Pavía and Arsenio Martínez Campos.

The repression of the Cantonal Revolution resulted in the strengthening of the political influence of the Spanish Army, which carried out a coup d'état against the Republic, established a military government and eventually restored the monarchy. The experience radicalised many federal republicans towards anarchism, which progressively grew in influence over the course of the late 19th century.

== Background ==
In 1868, the reign of Isabella II in Spain was overthrown in the Glorious Revolution, which resulted in the promulgation of a new constitution by liberals and progressives. On 16 November 1870, the provisional government led by Francisco Serrano and Joan Prim elected Amadeo of Savoy as the new King of Spain. But the reign of Amadeo was marked by persistent political instability, beginning with the assassination of Prim and culminating in the outbreak of the Third Carlist War in 1872. Amadeo also presided over several changes in government, with multiple elections ending in inconclusive results.

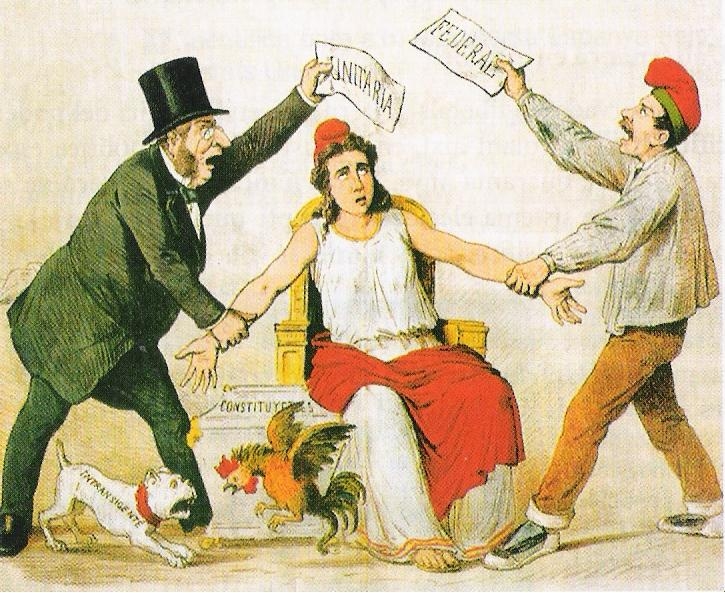
Political cartoon from the satirical magazine La Flaca (3 March 1873) about the struggle between the radicals and the federal republicans, as well as the internal conflict between moderate and intransigent federal republicans

Widespread discontent with the monarchy provoked Amadeo's abdication on 11 February 1873 and the formation of the First Spanish Republic. Like the monarchy before it, the new republic was also subject to internal divisions: the Radical Democratic Party (PDR), largely supported by the upper middle class in Madrid, advocated for a centralised unitary state along the lines of the French Republic; and the Federal Democratic Republican Party (PRDF), supported by the lower middle classes in the peripheral provinces, advocated for a decentralised federation along the lines of the Swiss Confederation. The federalists themselves were also internally divided into two factions: the benevolents (Spanish: benevelos), who believed in the constitution of a republic through legal means; and the intransigents (Spanish: intransigentes), who rejected parliamentary politics in favour of establishing a federal republic through a grassroots revolution.

Despite the federalists lacking majority support, no other political force could sufficiently oppose them, as the anti-federalists had already been marginalised after a failed coup attempt, while the Carlist rebels were largely confined to the mountains in Catalonia. An attempt to proclaim a Catalan State, which many federalists hoped would result in the creation of a federal republic from the bottom-up, was also short-lived. Rank-and-file soldiers deserted the army en masse after receiving assurances that the federalists would abolish conscription, and paramilitaries were established throughout Spain as a replacement to the hierarchical Spanish Army. Following the victory of the FDRP in the 1873 Spanish general election, a Constituent Cortes began drafting a constitution for a federal republic, based on a decentralised system of cantons. Estanislao Figueras was also replaced as prime minister of Spain by Francesc Pi i Margall, the founder of the federalist movement. Although brought to power by the influence of the intransigent faction, he advocated for conciliation between the left-wing and right-wing factions of his party, and attempted to convince the intransigents to concede to political moderation. But disagreements over whether the federal republic should be constituted from the top-down, as proposed by Pi, or from the bottom-up, as advocated by the intransigents, resulted in the latter rising up to establish a cantonal republic.

== Uprising ==
=== Proclamation of the Cantons ===
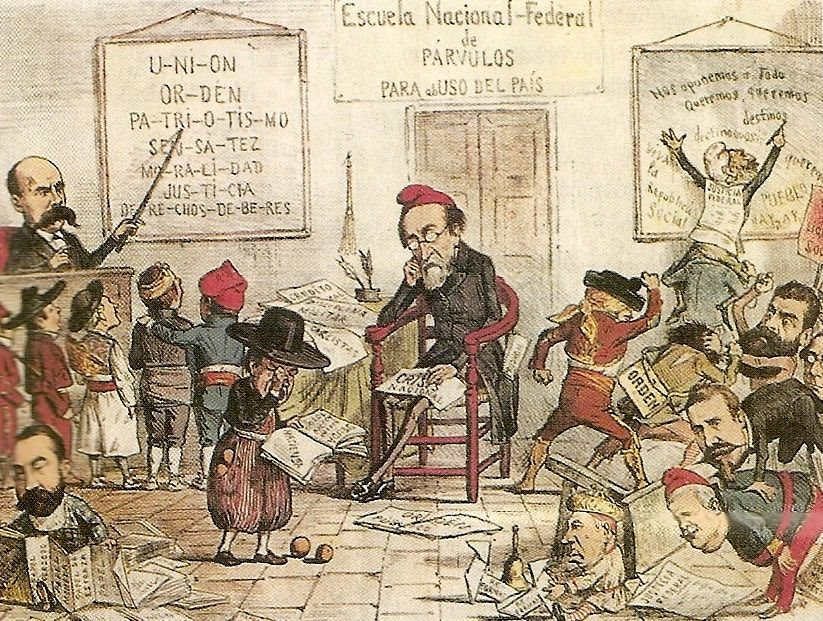
Cartoon in La Flaca in which Pi i Margall is depicted as a schoolteacher being overwhelmed by federalist children

On 12 July 1873, intransigent federalists in Cartagena seized control of the City Council and proclaimed the establishment of an autonomous Canton of Cartagena. They established a new Cantonal government, which concerned itself with the defense of Cartagena, under the leadership of Juan Contreras y Román and Roque Barcia, two members of the city's lower-middle class. They also seized the warships docked in the port of Cartagena, which together represented the majority of the Spanish Navy. These Cantonalists aimed to accelerate political reforms and establish a new federal republic from the bottom-up, based on the model of the cantons of Switzerland. They published their political programme in the newspaper El Cantón Murciano, which notably lacked any programme for social reform beyond political questions.

The uprising caused parliamentary support for the Pi government to collapse, as the right-wing came to regard him as a socialist, the left-wing criticised him for failing to support revolutionary action, and the centre ground evaporated. On 18 July, Pi resigned as prime minister and was replaced by Nicolás Salmerón, who aligned himself closer with the right-wing. Pi's resignation accelerated the spread of the uprising. From 19 to 22 July, Cantonalists armed themselves and seized cities and towns throughout Spain: in Andalusia, Cantonalists took over Algeciras, Andújar, Bailén, Cádiz, Granada, Seville and Tarifa; in León, they took over Salamanca; in Murcia, they took over Almansa; and in the Valencian Country, they took over Castelló, Torrevella and València. The rebellion mostly gained traction in southern and eastern Spain, as government forces had largely abandoned these regions in order to pacify the Carlist rebellion in the north. Unlike the other cities of Andalusia, Córdoba never joined the insurrection, as its militia had earlier been disarmed and federalist leaders arrested by the provincial military governor, who had anticipated a revolt.

=== Internationalist participation ===
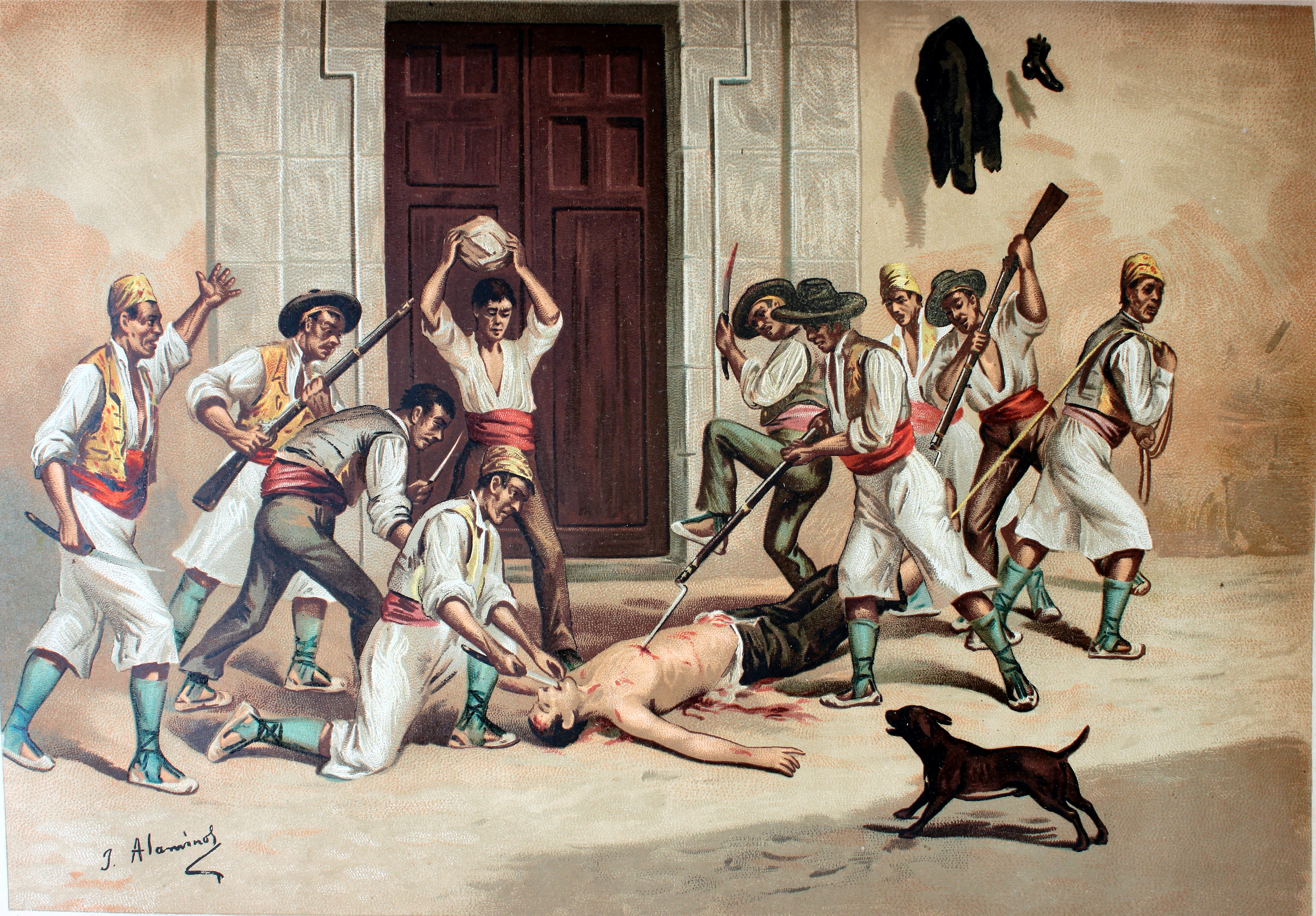
The murder of Agustí Albors, the mayor of Alcoi, during the Petroleum Revolution

The uprising was joined by the Spanish Regional Federation of the International Workingmen's Association (FRE-AIT), which had established clandestine cells throughout southern and eastern Spain to prepare for the event of an insurrection. Of its 45,633 members, 27,894 were reported to be rural workers from Andalusia, which became the epicentre of the Cantonalist uprising. Many Spanish anarchists, including Ricardo Mella and Joan Montseny, considered anarchism to be the natural extension of federal republicanism, although others within the FRE warned that the Republic was a "bourgeois myth" that would not advance the position of the workers in Spanish society. The FRE ultimately encouraged workers to participate in the Revolution, but warned them not to lay down arms until they had achieved their objective of bringing the means of production under collective ownership. Observing the collapse of the Spanish state, the anarchist leader Mikhail Bakunin commented that the conditions were ripe for transforming the lower-middle class political revolution into a social revolution.

In the Valencian Country, internationalists led an internationalist uprising in Alcoy, and in Andalusia, they rose up in Sanlúcar de Barrameda. Internationalists led the cantonalist movement in the Andalusian cities of Málaga, Granada and Seville. They also convinced sailors in Cartagena to join the uprising, and fought under the intransigents in Valencia. In Barcelona, the capital of Catalonia, members of the FRE carried out a general strike and worked together with intransigents to seize control of the City Council and establish a Committee of Public Safety. But the events in Barcelona failed to escalate into a revolution, with Friedrich Engels later commenting that "Barcelona was the only town whose participation [in the cantonalist movement] could have provided firm support for the working-class element". The Swiss anarchist James Guillaume held the Marxists responsible for the Catalan workers' refusal to join the revolution. In its report to the Geneva Congress of the Anti-authoritarian International, the Federal Council of the FRE expressed its worry that the cantonalist revolution would result in the suppression of the workers' movement. In an August 1873 letter to their Italian counterparts, the FRE reported that their organisation was being portrayed as the instigators of the Cantonalist uprising, rather than supporters, which they declared had resulted in them being "persecuted like wild beasts".

=== Suppression ===
The government of Spain quickly dispatched its troops to suppress the uprising. Manuel Pavía led 3,000 soldiers to Seville, which he pacified after two days of fighting, before continuing on to suppress the rebellion in other parts of Andalusia. The Canton of Valencia fought against the forces of Arsenio Martínez Campos for two weeks, before it was also pacified. The Cantons in Almansa, Castellò, Salamanca and San Lucár were also pacified by the military. By mid-September 1873, the rebellion had largely been suppressed, with only the Canton of Cartagena continuing to hold out, protected by its large defensive walls and naval base. During the siege, one of the canton's leaders appealed to the United States for protection. After four months under siege, military officers in Cartagena surrendered the city.

== Legacy ==
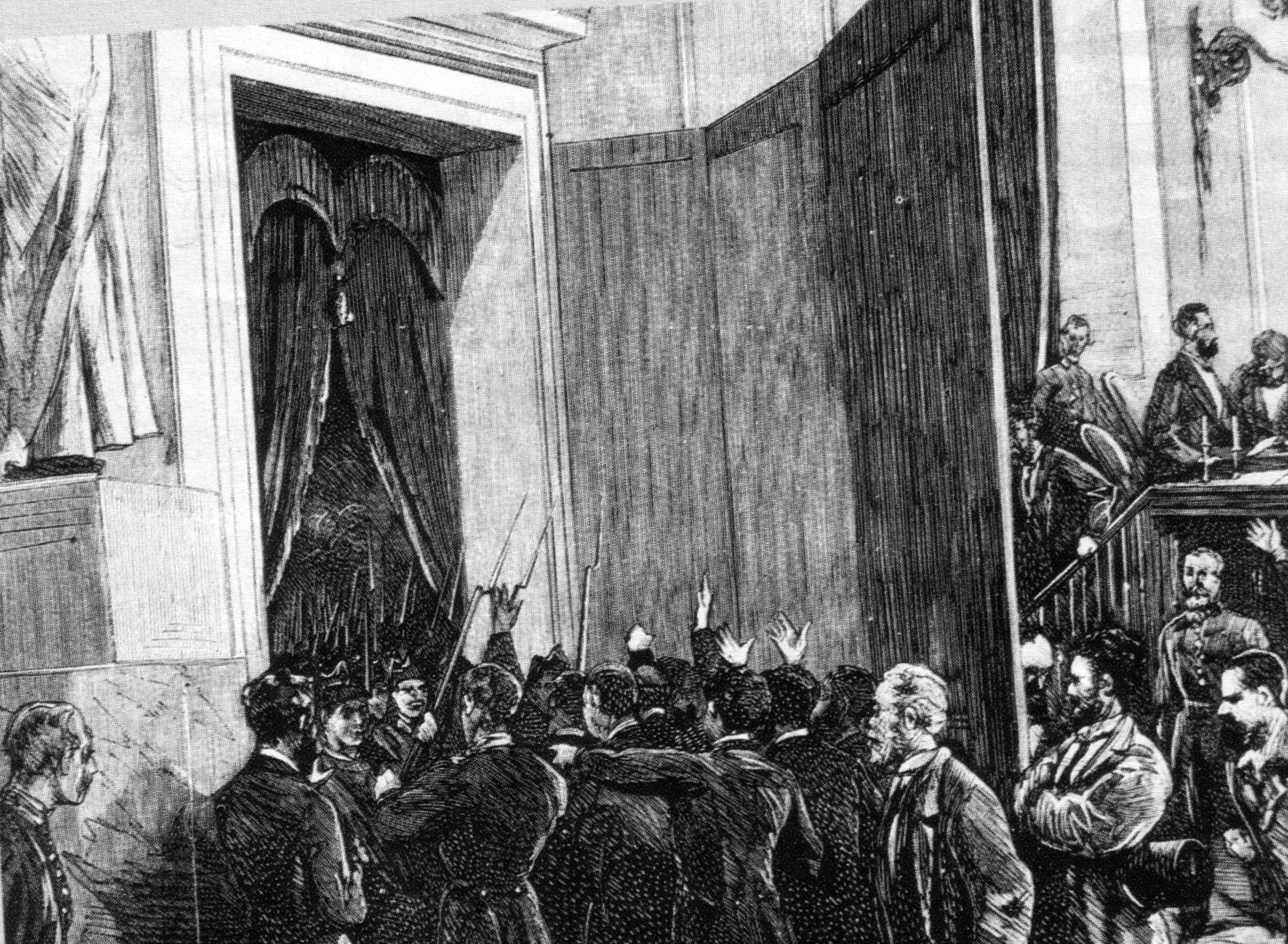
Illustration in La Ilustración Española y Americana, depicting the coup d'état led by Manuel Pavía

By the time the uprising was suppressed, Nicolás Salmerón had lost the confidence of the Cortes, as the left-wing was alienated by his repressive policies and the right-wing judged him for his reluctance to uphold militarism. Salmerón was subsequently replaced as prime minister by the right-wing politician Emilio Castelar, who oversaw the further strengthening of the Spanish Army, the prorogation of parliament and the suspension of constitutional rights. The position of the Spanish Army in Spanish politics had already been strengthened by the rebellion, with General Manuel Pavia coming to be known as the "Saviour of Spain", but was now definitively the main political force in the country. On 3 January 1874, Pavía deposed Castelar in a coup d'état and installed the conservative military officer Francisco Serrano as prime minister. Parliament was dissolved, bringing the country firmly under the control of a military government. On 7 January, the FRE-AIT organised a general strike against the government and erected barricades in Barcelona, but by 9 January, the rebellion was repressed and the FRE-AIT was dissolved by order of the Captain General of Catalonia. The government intensified its crackdown against Cantonalists, with the anarchist newspaper El Orden reporting that prison authorities had drowned 66 participants in the Canton of Cádiz. The Cantonalist mayor of Cádiz, Fermín Salvochea, was court martialled and sentenced to life imprisonment in La Gomera, where he converted to anarchism. Serrano's government ultimately lasted less than a year, before Arsenio Martínez Campos led another coup to restore the Bourbon monarchy and install Alfonso XII on the throne. Spain remained under Bourbon rule for the next five decades.

Federalism went into a decline in the wake of the Cantonalist uprising and the Bourbon Restoration. Many within the federalist movement turned towards anarchism, which they saw as the logical conclusion of their desires for decentralisation, and Pi i Margall's federalism was later reconceived as a precursor to anarchism. Some anarchists, including José García Viñas, responded to the repression of the Cantonalist uprising by criticising the FRE-AIT's strategy of strike actions. Tomás González Morago wrote about the need for "a long period of preparation and propaganda" before any revolutionary general strike could be carried out. Francesc Tomàs characterised the uprising as a wholly political revolution and criticised it for its middle-class character, which he believed to have harmed the working-class. On the other hand, Juan Serrano Oteiza identified the Cantonalist revolt and the prior uprising of the Paris Commune with the anarchist conception of the autonomous municipality. In his own analysis of the cantonalist revolt, Friedrich Engels criticised the anarchists themselves for failing to take a leading role in the movement. He denounced the FRE for its apoliticism, its refusal to support the Pi i Margall government and its alliance with the intransigent republicans. The Cantonal Revolution also alienated many other republicans from the model of federalism, direct democracy and political autonomy. Instead they began to advocate for a centralised government, which would be elected according to representative democracy and would make political decisions through parliament.

During the early years of the Bourbon Restoration, the Spanish government took steps to repress the federalists and internationalists, and their support base among organised workers. Freedom of association was repealed, prohibiting trade union activity and driving the organised labour movement underground. The remnants of the FRE-AIT reorganised into a looser structure, establishing small clandestine cells to carry out direct action against the state. In Andalusia, the Cantonalist insurrection resulted in the spread of anarchist ideas from the major cities to rural areas, where peasants began revolting against their landlords. Following its involvement in the Cantonalist movement, the anarchist movement became more violent during the 1880s and 1890s, as many adopted the tactic of propaganda of the deed.

== Bibliography ==
- Bookchin, Murray (1978). The Spanish Anarchists: The Heroic Years 1868–1936. Harper & Row. ISBN 0-06-090607-3.
- Esenwein, George Richard (1989). Anarchist Ideology and the Working-class Movement in Spain, 1868–1898. University of California Press. ISBN 978-0520063983.
- Molnár, Miklós; Pekmez, Juan (1974). "Rural Anarchism in Spain and the 1873 Cantonalist Revolution". In Landsberger, H.A. (ed.). Rural Protest: Peasant Movements and Social Change. Palgrave Macmillan. pp. 158–193. doi:10.1007/978-1-349-01612-9_5.
- Moisand, Jeanne (2018). "Revolutions, Republics and IWMA in the Spanish Empire". In Bensimon, Fabrice; Deluermoz, Quentin; Moisand, Jeanne (eds.). "Arise Ye Wretched of the Earth" The First International in a Global Perspective. Brill. pp. 238–252. doi:10.1163/9789004335462_016. ISBN 9789004335455.
- Peyrou, Florencia (2013). "A Great Family of Sovereign Men: Democratic Discourse in Nineteenth-Century Spain". European History Quarterly. 43 (2): 235–256. doi:10.1177/0265691413477611.
- Oltra, Joaquim (1999). "Jefferson's Declaration of Independence in the Spanish Political Tradition". The Journal of American History. 85 (4): 1370–1379. doi:10.2307/2568258. JSTOR 2568258.
- Woodcock, George (1962). "Anarchism in Spain". Anarchism: A History of Libertarian Ideas and Movements. World Publishing Company. pp. 356–398. LCCN 62-12355.
