= First Spanish Republic =

1873–1874 republican government in Spain

Spanish Republic República Española
- 1873–1874
- Flag Coat of arms
- Motto: Plus Ultra (Latin); Further Beyond
- Anthem: Himno de Riego; Anthem of Riego
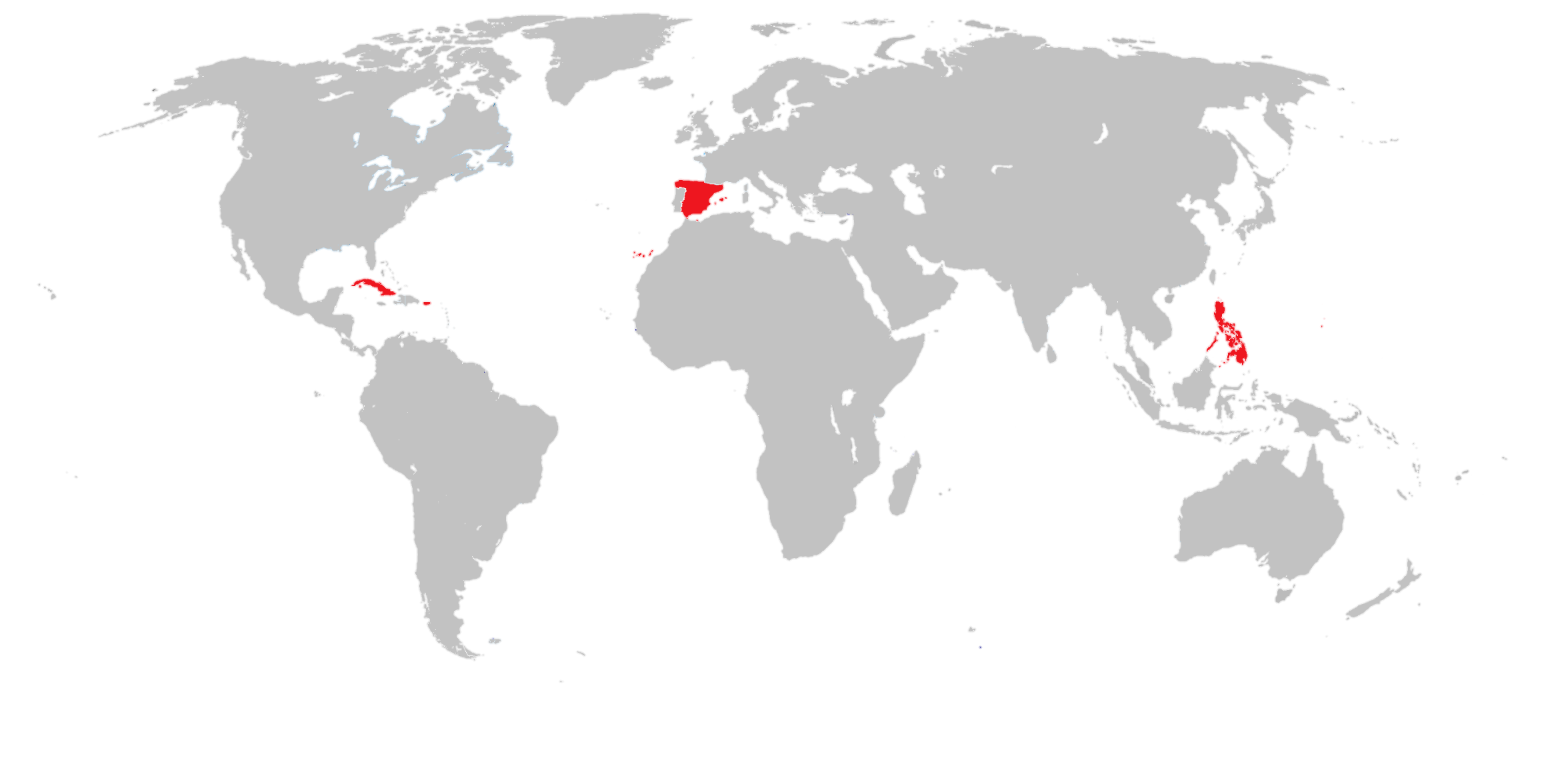
- Capital: Madrid
- Common languages: Spanish
- Religion: Catholicism
- Demonyms: Spaniard, Spanish
- Government: Federal semi-presidential republic
- President
  - 1873: Estanislao Figueras
  - 1873: Francesc Pi i Margall
  - 1873: Nicolás Salmerón
  - 1873–1874: Emilio Castelar
  - 1874: Francisco Serrano
- Prime Minister
  - 1874: Juan de Zavala
  - 1874: P. Mateo Sagasta
- Legislature: Congress of Deputies
- History
  - Amadeo I abdicates: 11 February 1873
  - Cantonal Revolution: 12 July 1873
  - Monarchy restored: 29 December 1874
- Currency: Spanish peseta
- ISO 3166 code: ES
Preceded by	Succeeded by
Kingdom of Spain (Savoy)	Kingdom of Spain (Bourbon)

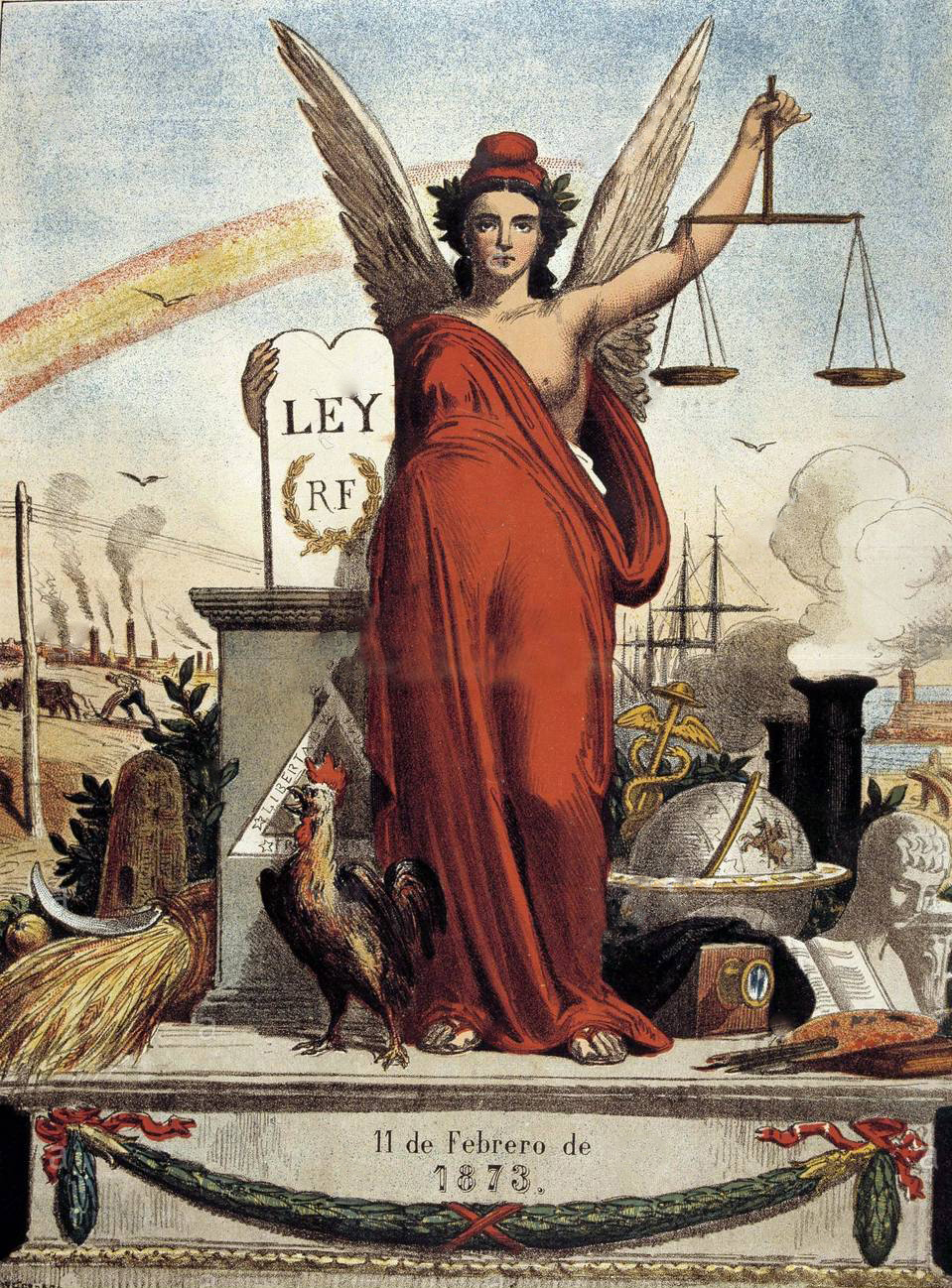
Allegory of the Spanish Republic, published in a satirical and liberal magazine

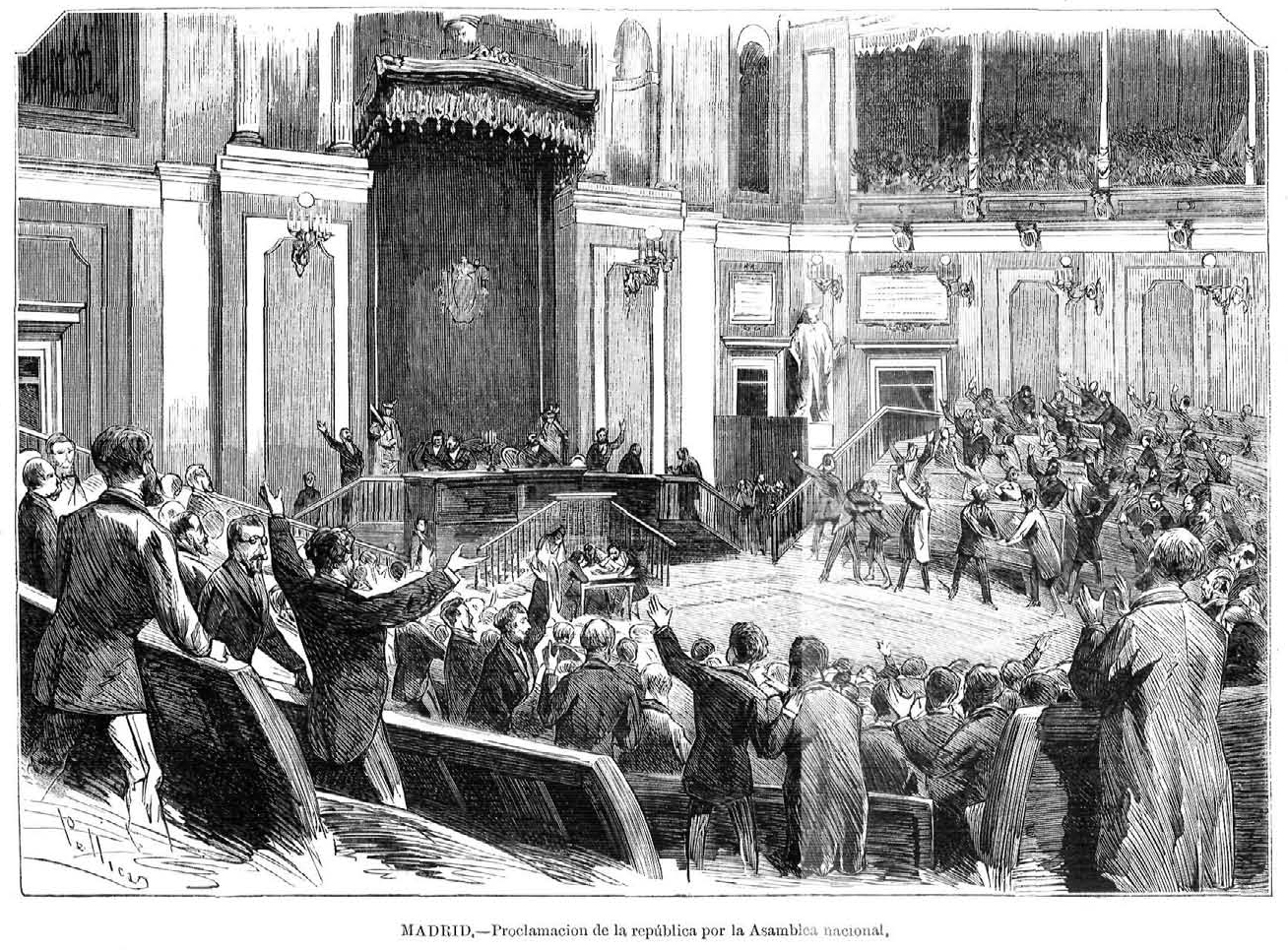
Engraving of the proclamation of the republic by Josep Lluís Pellicer, 1873.

The Spanish Republic (Spanish: República española), historiographically referred to as the First Spanish Republic (Spanish: Primera República española), was the political regime that existed in Spain from 11 February 1873 to 29 December 1874.

The Republic was founded after the abdication of King Amadeo on 10 February 1873. On the next day a republic was proclaimed by a parliamentary majority made up of radicals, republicans and democrats. The period was beset by tensions between federal republicans and unitary republicans. The period also saw the end of compulsory conscription, the regulation of child labor and the abolition of slavery in Puerto Rico. The government inherited a state of war, the so-called Third Carlist War, ongoing since 1872, and the Ten Years' War in Cuba, ongoing since 1868, to which was added the Cantonal Rebellion in 1873.

The January 1874 coup by General Manuel Pavía ousted the government, giving way to a military dictatorship under General Francisco Serrano. In December 1874, General Arsenio Martínez Campos proclaimed Alfonso XII king of Spain in Sagunto, bringing an end to the Republic and initiating the period of Spanish history known as the Bourbon Restoration.

== Proclamation of the Republic ==
Shield of the First Spanish Republic

King Amadeo I abdicated from the Spanish throne on 11 February 1873. His decision was mainly due to the constant difficulties he had to face during his short tenure, such as the Ten Years' War, the outbreak of the Third Carlist War, the opposition from alfonsino monarchists, who hoped for the Bourbon Restoration in the person of Alfonso, son of Isabella II, the many republican insurrections, and the division among his own supporters.

The Cortes Generales, which was assembled in a joint and permanent session of both the Congress of Deputies and the Senate, declared themselves the National Assembly while waiting for any final notice from the King. The overwhelming majority was with the monarchists from the two dynastic parties that had exercised the government until then: the Radical Democratic Party of Manuel Ruiz Zorrilla and the Constitutional Party of Práxedes Mateo Sagasta. There also was a small republican minority in the National Assembly, ideologically divided between federalism and centralism. Federal Democratic Republican Party member Francisco Pi y Margall moved the following proposition: "The National Assembly assumes powers and declares the Republic as the form of government, leaving its organization to the Constituent Cortes" (which was to be convened).

In his speech for the proposition (to which he was a signatory, along with Estanislao Figueras, Salmerón, and other opposition deputies), Pi y Margall—himself a federalist—renounced for the moment establishing a federal republic, hoping the Constituent Corte would decide the issue, and announced his acceptance of any other democratic decision. Then another republican, Emilio Castelar, took the floor and said:

Sirs, traditional monarchy died with Ferdinand VII; parliamentary monarchy with the flight of Isabella II; democratic monarchy with the abdication of don Amadeo of Savoy. Nobody has done away with it, it has died on its own. Nobody brings the Republic, save all circumstances, a cabal of society, nature, and history. Sirs, let us greet it like the sun rising with its own strength on the sky of our nation.

After Castelar's powerful speech, amidst passionate applause, the proposition was carried by 258 votes in favour and only 32 against, with the monarchists submitting. Thus the Republic was declared, with this sentence added: "An Executive Power shall be elected directly by the Cortes, and it shall be responsible to the same."

In the same session, the initial government of the Republic was elected. Figueras, a Federal republican was elected the first "President of the Executive Power", an office incorporating the heads of State and Government. No "President of the Republic" was ever elected, as the Constitution creating such office was never enacted. In his speech, Figueras said that the Republic "was like a rainbow of peace and harmony of all Spaniards of good will."

The passage of these resolutions surprised and stunned most Spaniards, as the recently elected Cortes (now National Assembly) had a wide majority of monarchists. Ruiz Zorrilla spoke in these terms: "I protest and will keep doing so, even if I'm left on my own, against those representatives that having come to the Cortes as constitutional monarchists feel themselves authorized to make the decision to turn the nation from monarchist to republican overnight."

For most monarchists, though, the impossibility of restoring Isabella II as Queen, and the youth of the future Alfonso XII made the Republic the only, though transitory, viable course of action, particularly given the inevitable failure that awaited it.

=== Figueras government ===
The first government of the Republic was composed of federalists and progressives who had been ministers during the monarchy. Four ministers in particular had served with King Amadeo: Echegaray (Finance), Becerra (Development), Fernández de Córdoba (War) and Beránger (Navy).

At the beginning, the government was plagued by a terrible economic situation, with a 546M peseta budgetary deficit, 153M in debts requiring immediate payment, and only 32M available to fulfill these obligations. The Artillery Corps had been dissolved in the most virulent moment of the Carlist and Cuban wars, for which there were not enough soldiers or armament, nor money to provide them. Besides, Spain was going through a deep economic crisis matching the Panic of 1873 and which was exacerbated by the political instability. In previous years, unemployment had risen steeply amongst field and industrial workers, and proletarian organizations responded with strikes, demonstrations, protest rallies and the occupation of abandoned lands.

On 23 February the newly elected Speaker of the National Assembly, radical Cristino Marcos, plotted a failed coup d'etat in which the Civil Guard occupied the Ministry of Governance and the National Militia surrounded the Congress of Deputies, in order to establish a unitary republic. This prompted the first remodeling of the government in which the progressives were ousted and replaced with federalists. Twelve days after the establishment of the Republic, compulsory military service was removed and voluntary service set up with a daily salary of 1 peseta and one crust (loaf?) of bread. A Republican volunteers corps was also established with an enlistment salary of 50 pesetas and a daily salary of 2 pesetas and 1 crust of bread.

The second Figueras government had to contend with the proclamation of a Catalan state within the Spanish republic on 9 March. The proclamation was rescinded two days later on 11 March in exchange for the dissolution of the Spanish army in Catalonia. On 23 April a new coup attempt was set in motion; this time by a collusion of alfonsino monarchists, members of the old Liberal Union and monarchic sectors of the Army; but failed when several units refrained from supporting it at the last hour.

Francisco Pi y Margall is usually considered the heart of this government, which had to face several problems already endemic to the Republic, such as the Third Carlist War, separatist insurrections (this time from Catalonia), military indiscipline, monarchic plots, etc. His government dissolved the National Assembly and summoned Constituent Cortes for 1 May. On 23 April Cristino Martos, Speaker of the old National Assembly, attempted a new coup, now supported by the Civil Governor of Madrid: a battalion of militiamen took positions along the Paseo del Prado, and four thousand more perfectly armed volunteers gathered near Independence Square under the pretext of passing review. Having heard from the plot, Pi i Margall mobilized the Civil Guard. For his part, after the Minister of War appointed Baltasar Hidalgo as the new Captain General for Madrid, he ordered Brigadier Carmona and a battalion of infantry and various artillery and cavalry units, to march on the militiamen. The coup d'état failed as soon as it started, and the government dissolved the military units participating and the Permanent Committee of the Assembly.

The writs were issued for Constituent Cortes elections on 10 May which resulted 343 seats for federal republicans and 31 for the rest of the political forces. The elections themselves developed in a quite unorthodox environment, and the resulting representation was ridiculous, as most factions in Spain did not participate: the Carlists were still waging war against the Republic, while the alfonsino monarchists of Antonio Cánovas del Castillo, the unitary republicans and even the incipient workers' organization close to the First International all called for abstention. The result was clearly favourable to the federal republicans, which captured 343 of the 371 seats, but turnout was probably the lowest in Spanish history, with about 28% in Catalonia and 25% in Madrid.

== The Federal Republic ==
On 1 June 1873 the first session of the Constituent Cortes was opened and the presentation of resolutions began. The first one was debated on 7 June, written by seven representatives: "First Article. The form of government of the Spanish Nation is the Democratic Federal Republic".

The president, having carried out the Cortes' regulations for the definite approval of proposal of law, arranged to hold a nominal vote the next day. The resolution was passed 8 June by a favorable vote of 219 representatives and only two against, and the Federal Republic was thus declared. Most of the federalists in parliament supported a Swiss-like confederative model, with regions directly forming independent cantons. Spanish writer Benito Pérez Galdós, aged 21 at the time, wrote about the parliamentary atmosphere of the First Republic:

The sessions of the Constituent (Cortes) attracted me, and most afternoons I spent in the press box, enjoying the spectacle of indescribable confusion cast by the fathers of the country. An endless individualism, the coming and going of opinions, from the most thought-out to the most extravagant, and the deadly spontaneity of most speakers, drove the spectator crazy and rendered the historic functions impossible. Days and nights went by without the Cortes deciding how the ministers should be appointed: if they would individually elected by a vote of each representative, or if it would be better to authorize Figueras or Pi to come up with a list of the new government. Each and every system was agreed on and later scrapped. It was a puerile game, which would have caused laughter if it had not been deeply sad.

The situation reached such levels of surrealism that, while presiding over a Cabinet session, Estanislao Figueras yelled: "Gentlemen, I can't stand this any more. I am going to be frank with you: I'm fed up with all of us!" (Note: In Spanish: «Señores, ya no aguanto más. Voy a serles franco: ¡estoy hasta los cojones de todos nosotros!» In the allegedly original Catalan: «Senyors, ja no aguanto més. Vaig a ser-los franc: estic fins als collons de tots nosaltres!») So fed up that on 10 June he left his resignation letter in his office, went for a walk through the Parque del Buen Retiro and, without telling anyone, boarded the first train departing from the Atocha Station. He would only step down upon arriving in Paris.

== The government of Pi i Margall ==
"The federal republic for Pi y Margall

The procedure — there's no reason to hide it — was openly the reverse of the past: the result could be the same. The provinces had to be represented in the new Cortes, and if they had any concrete idea on the limits over the powers of the future states, they could take it to the Cortes and defend it there. As the delimitation of the powers of the provinces would have also determined that of the state, the delimitation of the central power would determine that of the provinces. One way or another could have, without any doubt, produced the same constitution and it would not have been, in my opinion, neither patriotic nor political, to ensnare the proclamation of the Republic due to intransigence over this point.

Even though the "bottom to top" procedure was more logical and proper of a Federation, the other, "top to bottom" was more likely for an already-formed nation like ours, and less dangerous in its implementation. There would be no cessation of continuity in power; the life of the nation would not be suspended for a single moment; there would be no fear of deep conflicts arising between the provinces; it would be the easiest, fastest, safest way and the less exposed to contrariety... "

— Francisco Pi y Margall

After Figueras' flight to France, the power vacuum created was tempting general Manuel Sodas into starting a pronunciamiento when a Civil Guard colonel, José de la Iglesia, showed up at Congress and declared that nobody would leave until a new president was elected. Figueras' fellow federalist and government minister Francisco Pi y Margall was elected on 11 June, but in his speech to the Assembly he declared he was at a complete loss and without a program. The main efforts of the new government focused on drafting the new Constitution and some social character-related bills:

- Apportionment of disamortized lands among lessees, settlers, and aparceros. (Note: People who obtained free use of a land for a percentage of the profits. It was used by many landowners as an alternative to direct exploitation or rental.)}
- Re-establishment of the regular Army, with mandatory conscription.
- Separation of Church and State, which had been deeply intertwined under Ferdinand VII and only slightly separated by Isabella II.
- Abolition of slavery throughout the nation. Though the 1812 Cádiz Constitution had already taken some steps on the issue, the colonies remained opposed to the move from mainland Spain. Also, plans were made to limit child labor.
- Establishment of a system ensuring free and compulsory education.
- Legalization of the right to form labor unions, creation of mixed workers-managers juries, and establishment of the Eight hour day.

On 16 June a 25-member committee was set up by the Cortes to study the draft Constitution of the Federal Republic of Spain, the redaction of which is mainly attributed to Emilio Castelar, with debate starting the following day. On 28 June Pi i Margall renewed the composition of his government, but due to the slow pace of the constitutional debates in the Cortes, events came crashing down on the government at a stunning pace. On 30 June the City Council of Seville passed a motion declaring the town a Social Republic, and the next day many federalist deputies left the Cortes in protest. About a week later, on 9 July, Alcoy followed suit, when during a strike directed by local leaders of the First International, the police fired on the assmebled workers, who responded by taking up arms and gaining control of the city. These events became known as the Petroleum Revolution.

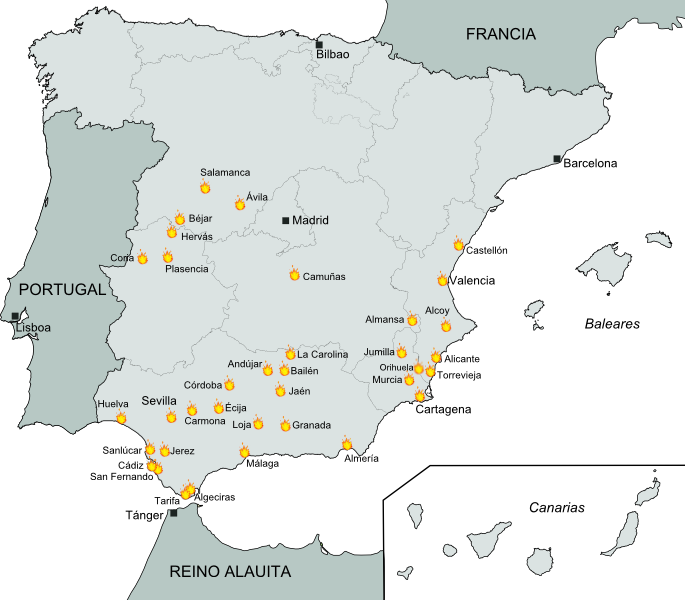
The Cantonal Revolution spread through southern and central Spain, but the traditionalist pro-Carlist northern regions of Catalonia, Aragon, and the Basque Country were involved in the Third Carlist War.

Shortly after, the Cantonal Rebellion swept across Spain with the federalist sentiment giving rise to several independent cantons. Uprisings were daily news in the southeastern area of Valencia, Murcia, and Andalusia. Some cantons were provincial in nature, like Valencia or Málaga, but most comprised just a city and its surroundings, like the more localised cantons of Alcoy, Cartagena, Seville, Cádiz, Almansa, Torrevieja, Castellón, Granada, Salamanca, Bailén, Andújar, Tarifa, and Algeciras. Even smaller were the village-based cantons of Camuñas (in Albacete) and Jumilla (in Murcia). The latter is said to have issued a manifesto stating:

La nación jumillana desea vivir en paz con todas las naciones vecinas y, sobre todo, con la nación murciana, su vecina; pero si la nación murciana, su vecina, se atreve a desconocer su autonomía y a traspasar sus fronteras, Jumilla se defenderá, como los héroes del Dos de Mayo, y triunfará en la demanda, resuelta completamente a llegar, en sus justísimos desquites, hasta Murcia, y a no dejar en Murcia piedra sobre piedra.

"The Jumillan nation wishes to live in peace with all nearby nations, and particularly with the nation of Murcia, her neighbor; but should the nation of Murcia dare not to recognize its autonomy and violate its borders, Jumilla will fight back like the heroes of 2 May, and shall be victorious in her demands, ready to arrive at Murcia, in its most just retribution, itself and leave no stone standing upon another."

There is, however, no record of such a manifesto, nor of any similar declaration, in the municipal archives; and the proceedings of the time seemed to be within normality. This has motivated several historians to deny the authenticity of the manifesto and even the very existence of the Jumilla canton, stating that its invention was merely a form of anti-republican propaganda.

The most active – and known – of the cantons was the Canton of Cartagena, its autonomy declared on 12 July at the city naval base under the inspiration of the federalist congressman Antonio Gálvez Arce, known as Antonete. The Canton of Cartagena survived six months of constant wars, and even minted its own currency, the duro cantonal.

The first deed of the Cartagenan cantonalists was the capture of the Castillo de San Julián, which motivated a strange telegram sent by the city's captain-general to the Minister of the Navy: "Saint Julian castle shows Turkish flag". This "Turkish flag" was in fact the cantonal flag, the first red flag in Spanish history (the Ottoman Civil Ensign was a plain red flag, hence the captain-general's terminology). Gálvez's passionate speeches allowed him to gain control of the Navy ships docked in the city, which at that time were among the best in the Spanish Navy. Under his command, the fleet wreaked havoc on the nearby Mediterranean shore, causing the Madrid government to declare him a pirate and set a bounty on his head. Back on land, he led an expedition towards Madrid that was defeated at Chinchilla.

Two cantonal frigates, Almansa and Vitoria, set sail towards a "foreign power" (the Spanish city of Almería) for fund-raising. As the city would not pay, it was bombarded and taken by the cantonalists. General Contreras, commanding officer of the cantonal fleet, ordered the Marcha Real to be played as he unboarded. Afterwards, the deed would be repeated in Alicante, but on the trip back to Cartagena they were captured as pirates by the armoured frigates HMS Swiftsure and SMS Friedrich Karl, under the UK and German flags respectively.

There were days in that summer in which we thought our Spain was completely disbanded. The idea of legality was lost to a point any employee of [the Ministry of] War would assume full powers and notify the Cortes, and those charged with handing and fulfilling the law would disregard it, raising or booming against legality. It was not about, as in other instances, replacing an existent Ministry or a form of Government in the accepted way; it was about dividing our homeland in a thousand parts, similar to the successors to the Cordoba Caliphate. The strangest ideas and the most dishevelled principles came from the provinces. Some said to be about to restore the old Crown of Aragon, as if the ways of modern Law were spells from the Middle Ages. Others wanted to form an independent Galicia under an English protectorate. Jaén was preparing to wage war against Granada. Salamanca was afraid of the closing of its glorious university and the demise of its scientific prowess [...] The uprising came against the most federalist of all possible governments, and at the very moment the Assembly was preparing a draft Constitution, the worst defects of which came from the lack of time in the Committee and the surplus of impatience in the Government.

— Emilio Castelar

An even worse problem was the Third Carlist War, in which the rebels controlled most of the Basque Country, Navarre, and Catalonia without opposition, and sent raiding parties throughout the peninsula. The Carlist pretender, Charles VII, had formed a rival government in Estella with his own ministers and was already minting currency, while French connivance allowed him to receive external aid and fortify his defences. Between the Carlists and the cantonal rebellion, the actual territory in which the short-lived Republic exerted undisputed authority did not extend much further than the province of Madrid itself and northwestern Spain, as cantonal uprisings took place as far north as Ávila.

Due to the rapid pace of the events, and without time for the new Constitution to be passed by the Cortes, Pi i Margall found himself between a rock and the proverbial hard place of the cantonal revolution. However, as effective Commander in Chief of the Republic he rejected all calls, from both military and political figures, to suppress the cantonal uprisings, as he argued they were just following his very own doctrine. Thus he was forced to resign on 18 July after just 37 days in office. He would later sorely describe his experience as premier:

So many have my upsets with power been that I can no longer covet it. While in the Government I have lost my calm, my illusions, my trust in fellow men which was the base of my character. For each grateful man, a hundred ungratefuls; for each disinterested and patriotic one, hundreds that wanted from politics nothing more than the satisfaction of their whims. I have received bad for good.

== Drafting the Federal Constitution ==
The draft of the Federal Constitution of the First Republic of Spain developed at length into 117 articles organized under 17 titles.

In the first article, the following is found:

Composing the Spanish Nation the states of Andalucía Alta, Andalucía Baja, Aragón, Asturias, Baleares, Canarias, Castilla la Nueva, Castilla la Vieja, Cataluña, Cuba, Extremadura, Galicia, Murcia, Navarra, Puerto Rico, Valencia, Regiones Vascongadas. The states will be able to conserve the actual provinces and modify them, according to their territorial necessities.

These states would have "complete economic-administrative autonomy and political autonomy compatible with the existence of the nation" such as "the ability to give it a political constitution" (articles 92 and 93).

The constitutional draft anticipated in Title IV—in addition to the classic Legislative Power, Executive Power and Judicial Power—a fourth Relational Power that would be exercised by the president of the Republic.

Legislative Power would be in the hands of the Federal Cortes, which would be composed of the Congress and the Senate. Congress was to be a house of proportional representation with one representative "for every 50,000 souls", renewing every two years. The Senate was to be a house of territorial representation, four senators being elected by the Cortes of each one of the states.

Executive Power would be exercised by the Ministry of Advisors, whose president would be elected by the president of the republic.

Article 40 of the draft stated: "In the political organization of the Spanish nation, all things individual are the pure domain of the individual; all things municipal are that of the municipality; all things regional are that of the state; and all things national, of the Federation." The following article declared that "All powers are elective, revocable, and accountable", and Article 42 that "Sovereignty resides in all citizens, which they exercise by their own representation by the political organizations of the Republic, constituted through universal suffrage."

Judicial Power would reside in the Federal Supreme Court, which would be composed "of three magistrates for each state of the federation" (Article 73) that would never be elected by the Executive Power or the Legislative Power. It also would establish that all courts would be profession and the judicial institution for all classes of representatives.

Relational Power would be exercised by the president of the Federal Republic whose mandate would last "four years, not being immediately reeligible", as says Article 81 of the draft.

== Government of Nicolás Salmerón ==
After accepting the resignation of Pi i Margall, Nicolás Salmerón was elected president of the Executive Power, with 119 votes in favor and 93 votes against.

The new president, who was a moderate federalist republican, defended the necessity of arriving at an understanding with the more moderate or conservative groups and a slow transition toward a federal republic. His oratory was crushing: Francisco Silvela said that in his speeches, Salmerón only used one weapon—artillery. Antonio Maura characterized the professorial tone of Don Nicolás, saying that "it always seemed that he was addressing the metaphysicists of Albacete."

Already during his stints as Minister of Mercy and Justice in the government of Estanislao Figueras, he brought about the abolition of the death penalty, even the independence of judicial power in the face of the political.

His nomination produced an intensification of the cantonal movement, which to control he had to resort to generals openly against the Federal Republic, sending military expeditions to Andalucía and Valencia under the respective command of generals Pavía and Martínez Campos. One after another the separate cantons were subdued, except that of Cartagena, which resisted until 12 January 1874.

His generals asked the "awareness" of the government and his signature to execute various death sentences on various deserting soldiers on the Carlist front; according to them, this was essential to reestablishing discipline on the army. Salmerón, man of very advanced liberal principles, declined to concede the "awareness" and, as is written on the wall of his mausoleum, "abandoned power to not sign a death sentence." In this way, he resigned on 6 September.

== Government of Emilio Castelar ==
The next day, 7 September, the man elected to occupy the presidency of the Executive Power was unitarian Emilio Castelar, professor of History and distinguished orator, by 133 votes in favor against the 67 obtained by Pi y Margall. During his previous time as Minister of State in the government of Estanislao Figueras, Castelar promoted and achieved the approval of the abolition of slavery in the overseas territory of Puerto Rico, although not in Cuba because of the continuing war situation. This act by the First Spanish Republic is commemorated in Puerto Rico up to the present day.

Motivated by the difficult situation through which the Republic was passing, with the aggravation of the Carlist War, Emilio Castelar commenced the reorganization of the army, announcing before the Cortes "to sustain this form of government, I need much infantry, much cavalry, much artillery, much Civil Guard, and many riflemen." In spite of the federalist opposition, the Cortes conceded to him extraordinary powers to govern, after which they closed the Cortes on 20 September. He confirmed the death sentences that provoked the resignation of his predecessor, reestablished order, and was at the point of surrendering to the cantonalists of Cartagena.

Without doubt, the chaos incited by the cantonal revolt and the worsening of the Carlist War led them to reopen the Cortes on 2 January 1874, in order to bring to a vote the management and ask for unlimited powers with which to save the Republic from complete discredit.

In effect, the Cortes session opened on 2 January 1874, but the federalists rose up against Don Emilio Castelar, who was supported by the captain general of Madrid, Don Manuel Pavía, former supporter of Prim, with whom he had rebelled in Villarejo de Salvanés. Two very different forces threatened to interrupt the deliberations of the Cortes: the federalists, eager to finish Castelar with mighty wrath, and the troops of General Pavía, supporter of Castelar, who had decided to show up in his support to avoid his defeat before the federalists.

The committed regiments had already left at the captain general's orders when the Cortes recognized Castelar's defeat by 119 votes against 101. The former president of the Republic, and the president of the Cortes, Nicolás Salmerón, called for a new vote to elect a new chief of the Executive Power.

Pavía situated himself in front of the building with his staff and ordered two adjutants to impose upon Salmerón the dissolution of the Cortes session and the evacuation of the building in five minutes. The Civil Guard, which guarded the Congress, put into action the general's orders and occupied the halls of Congress (without entering the floor). It was 6:55 in the morning, when the vote to elect the federalist candidate Eduardo Palanca was proceeding, and Salmerón, upon receiving the captain general's order, suspended the vote and communicated the grave situation to the representatives. The representatives abandoned the building with all speed, amidst scenes of exaggerated hysterics; some even threw themselves out the windows. Pavía, surprised, asked: "But gentlemen, Why jump out the windows when you can leave through the door?"

Pavía, who was a unitarian republican, offered to allow Emilio Castelar to continue in the presidency, but he refused, not wanting to maintain power through undemocratic means. These acts signified the unofficial end of the First Republic, although it officially continued for almost a year.

== Unitary republic ==
At the same time as the political convulsions were taking place, General López Domínguez entered into Cartagena on 12 January, replacing Martínez Campos, while Antonete Gálvez, with more than a thousand men, struggled to elude him near the border of Numancia (Numantia) and set course for Oran (Algeria). The end of the cantonal experience was marked by Gálvez with his exile, but the Bourbon Restoration permitted him through amnesty to return to his native Torreagüera. In this period he would strike up a strange and warm friendship with Don Antonio Cánovas del Castillo, most responsible for the Restoration, who considered Gálvez a sincere, honorable, and valiant man, although one of exaggerated political ideas.

Meanwhile, after Emilio Castelar's refusal to continue as president, he put General Serrano, recently returned from his exile in Biarritz for his implication in the attempted coup of 23 April, in charge of the formation of a coalition government that grouped together monarchists, conservatives, and unitarian republicans, but excluded federalist republicans.

Francisco Serrano, Duke of Torre, 63 years old, former collaborator of Isabel II, had already twice freed the leadership of the state. He proclaimed the Unitary Republic, taking control of the presidency of the Executive Power, and dispensing with the Cortes in a conservative republican dictatorship. During his mandate he once and for all subdued the cantonal insurrections, and that of Cartagena, and concentrated his forces on the Carlist War in the north of Spain. The general attempted without success to consolidate power to himself in dictatorship form, following the example of the regime of dukes and generals that prevailed in France upon the fall of Napoleon III and after the defeat of the Paris Commune.

In just a few months, on 13 May, Serrano ceded the presidency of the government to Juan de Zavala y de la Puente to personally take control of the operations against the Carlists in the north. Práxedes Mateo Sagasta took charge of the government on 3 September. On 10 December the siege of Pamplona began, but it was interrupted by the Proclamation of Sagunto.

== End of the Republic ==
On 29 December 1874 in Sagunto, General Arsenio Martínez Campos came out in favour of the restoration to the throne of the Bourbon monarchy in the personage of Don Alfonso de Borbón, son of Isabel II. The government of Sagasta did not oppose this announcement, permitting the restoration of the monarchy. The triumph of the Bourbon Restoration succeeded thanks to the previous work of Antonio Cánovas del Castillo, which without a doubt was contrary to military rule.

Until 1931, the Spanish republicans celebrated the 11 February anniversary of the First Republic. Thereafter, the commemoration was moved to 14 April, the anniversary of the proclamation of the Second Republic in 1931.

== See also ==
- Second Spanish Republic
