= 1881 Spanish general election =

- 21 August 1881 (Congress); 2 September 1881 (Senate)

All 432 (Note: Including one seat by cumulative voting.) seats in the Congress of Deputies and 180 (of 360) seats in the Senate 217 seats needed for a majority in the Congress of Deputies
- Registered: 846,961
- Turnout: 604,758 (71.4%)
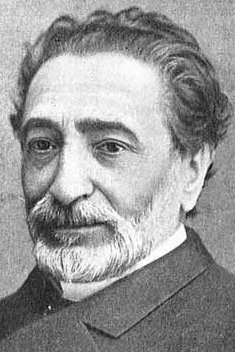

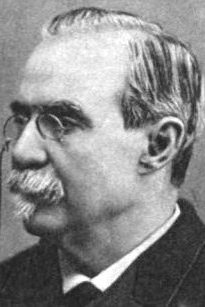

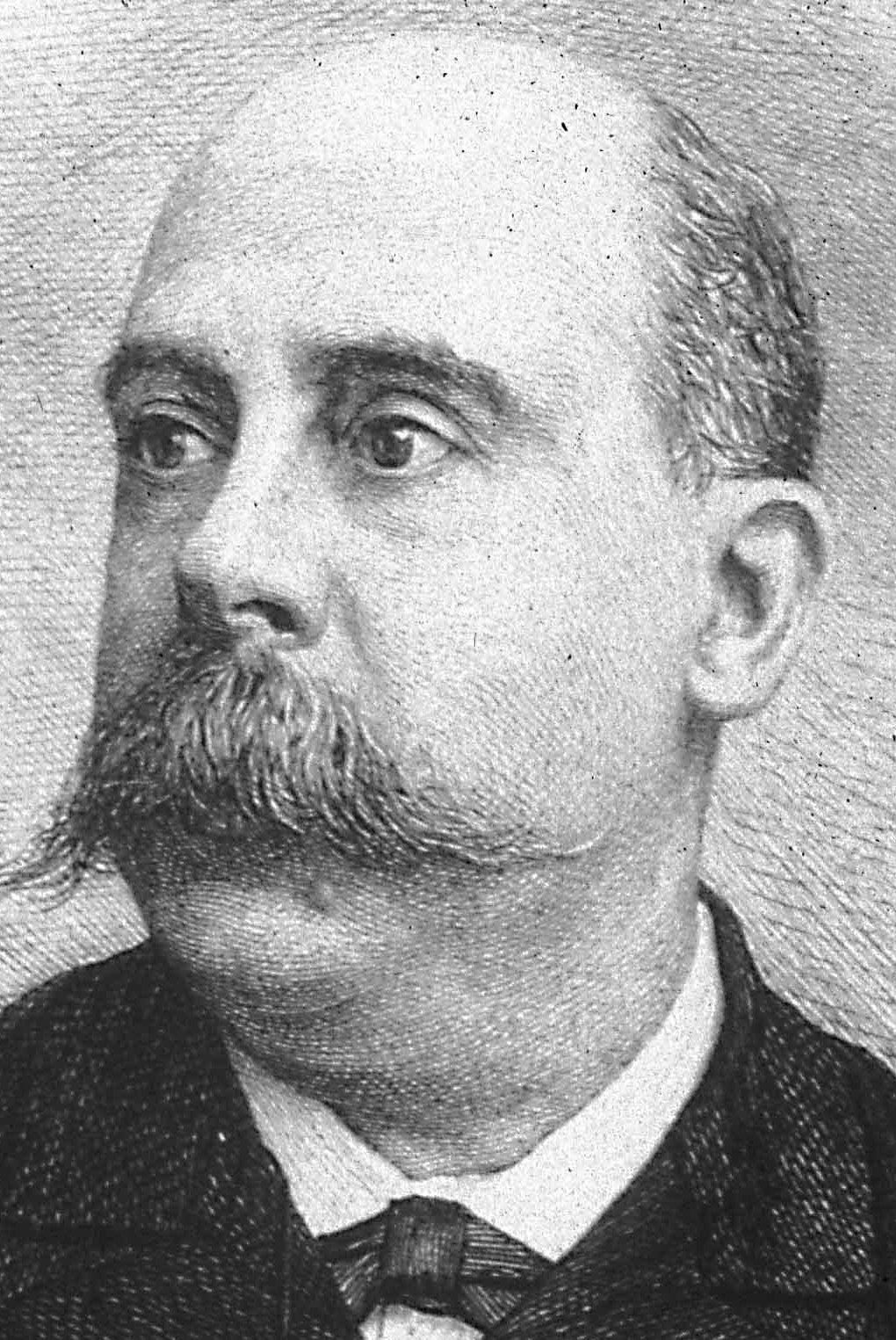
	First party	Second party	Third party
Leader	Práxedes Mateo Sagasta	Antonio Cánovas del Castillo	Emilio Castelar
Party	Fusionist	Conservative	Democratic
Leader since	1880	1874	1879
Leader's seat	Zamora	Cieza	Huesca
Seats won	297 C / 135 S	48 C / 15 S	32 C / 12 S
Prime Minister before election
Práxedes Mateo Sagasta
Liberal
Prime Minister after election
Práxedes Mateo Sagasta
Liberal

A general election was held in Spain on 21 August 1881 (for the Congress of Deputies), and on 2 September 1881 (for the Senate), to elect the members of the 2nd Cortes under the Spanish Constitution of 1876, during the Restoration period. All 432 seats in the Congress of Deputies were up for election, as well as 180 of 360 seats in the Senate.

== Background ==
Following the Bourbon Restoration in 1874, the Spanish Constitution of 1876 enshrined Spain as a semi-constitutional monarchy, awarding the monarch—under the royal prerogative—the right of legislative initiative together with the bicameral Cortes; the capacity to veto laws passed by the legislative body; the power to appoint government members (including the prime minister); the ability to grant or deny parliamentary dissolution, the adjournment of legislative sessions and the signature of royal decrees; as well as the title of commander-in-chief of the armed forces. The monarch would play a key role in the turno system by appointing and dismissing governments, which would then organize elections to provide themselves with a parliamentary majority. This informal system allowed the two major "dynastic" political parties at the time, the Conservatives and the Liberals—characterized as oligarchic, elite parties with loose structures dominated by internal factions, each led by powerful individuals—to alternate in power by means of electoral fraud (pucherazo). This was achieved by assigning candidates to districts before the elections were held (encasillado), then arrange their victory through the links between the Ministry of Governance and the territorial clientelistic networks of provincial governors and local bosses (the caciques), excluding minor parties from the power sharing.

== Overview ==
Under the 1876 Constitution, the Spanish Cortes were conceived as "co-legislative bodies", forming a nearly perfect bicameral system. Both the Congress of Deputies and the Senate exercised legislative, oversight and budgetary functions, sharing almost equal powers, except in budget laws (taxation and public credit)—whose first reading corresponded to Congress—and in impeachment processes against government ministers, where Congress handled indictment and the Senate the trial.

=== Date ===
The term of each chamber of the Cortes—the Congress and one-half of the elective part of the Senate—expired five years from the date of their previous election, unless they were dissolved earlier. The previous elections were held on 20 April 1879 for the Congress and on 3 May 1879 for the Senate, which meant that the chambers' terms would have expired on 20 April and 3 May 1884, respectively.

The monarch had the prerogative to dissolve both chambers at any given time—either jointly or separately—and call a snap election. There was no constitutional requirement for concurrent elections to the Congress and the Senate, nor for the elective part of the Senate to be renewed in its entirety except in the case that a full dissolution was agreed by the monarch. Still, there was only one case of a separate election (for the Senate in 1877) and no half-Senate elections taking place under the 1876 Constitution.

The Cortes were officially dissolved on 25 June 1881, with the corresponding decree setting election day for 21 August (Congress) and 2 September 1881 (Senate) and scheduling for both chambers to reconvene on 20 September.

=== Electoral system ===
Voting for the Congress of Deputies was based on censitary suffrage, comprising Spanish national males over 25 years of age who met either of the following:

- Being taxpayers with a minimum quota of Pts 25 in property taxes (paid one year in advance) or Pts 50 in corporate taxes (paid two years in advance);
- Holding specific positions (such as full academics in the royal academies, cathedral chapter members and parish priests, active public employees with a salary of Pts 2,000, retired public employees, general officers, awarded painters or sculptors, senior court officials and certified teachers);
- Having two years of residence in a Spanish municipality while proving a professional qualification.

In the Spanish West Indies (Cuba and Puerto Rico) the taxpayer requirement was higher (Pts 125, or $25), while former Cuban slaves were barred from voting until three years after becoming freedmen. In the Basque Provinces and Navarre—where taxes were not paid directly—voters had instead to prove wealth equivalent to an income of Pts 4,800; or Pts 2,400 in real estate, crops or livestock. Additional restrictions excluded those deprived of political rights or barred from public office by a final sentence, criminally imprisoned or convicted, legally incapacitated, bankrupt, and public debtors.

The Congress of Deputies had one seat per 50,000 inhabitants. Of these, those corresponding to larger urban areas were elected in multi-member constituencies using partial block voting: voters in constituencies electing eight seats could choose up to six candidates; in those with seven seats, up to five; in those with six seats, up to four; in those with four or five seats, up to three; and in those with three seats, up to two. The remaining seats were elected in single-member districts by plurality voting and distributed among the provinces of Spain according to population. Up to 10 additional members could be elected through cumulative voting if they ran in several single-member districts and obtained over 10,000 votes overall. Cuba and Puerto Rico were allocated 24 and 15 seats, respectively.

As a result of the aforementioned allocation, 320 single-member districts were established, and each Congress multi-member constituency (a total of 31, electing 111 seats) was entitled the following seats:

Seats	Constituencies
8	Havana, Madrid
5	Barcelona, Palma, Santa Clara
4	Santiago de Cuba, Seville
3	Alicante, Almería, Badajoz, Burgos, Cádiz, Cartagena, Córdoba, Granada, Jaén, Jerez de la Frontera, La Coruña, Lugo, Málaga, Matanzas, Murcia, Oviedo, Pamplona, Pinar del Río, Santa Cruz de Tenerife, Santander, Tarragona, Valencia, Valladolid, Zaragoza

Voting for the elective part of the Senate was also based on censitary suffrage, comprising Spanish male householders of voting age, residing in a Spanish municipality, with full political and civil rights, who met either of the following:

- Being qualified electors (such as archbishops, bishops and cathedral chapter members, in the archdioceses; full academics, in the royal academies; university authorities and professors, in the universities; or provincial deputies);
- Being elected as delegates (either by members with three years of seniority (in the economic societies of Friends of the Country; or by major taxpayers for direct taxes and local authorities, in the local councils).

180 Senate seats were elected using indirect, two-round majority voting. Delegates chosen by local councils—each of which was assigned an initial minimum of one delegate, with one additional delegate for every six councillors—voted for senators together with provincial deputies. The provinces of Álava, Albacete, Ávila, Biscay, Cuenca, Guadalajara, Guipúzcoa, Huelva, Logroño, Matanzas, Palencia, Pinar del Río, Puerto Príncipe, Santa Clara, Santander, Santiago de Cuba, Segovia, Soria, Teruel, Valladolid and Zamora were allocated two seats each, and the rest three each, for a total of 147. The remaining 33 seats were allocated to special institutional districts (one each), including major archdioceses, royal academies, universities, and economic societies, (Note: The following were considered as the major districts in each category: Archdioceses: Burgos, Granada, Santiago de Compostela, Santiago de Cuba, Seville, Tarragona, Toledo, Valencia, Valladolid, and Zaragoza.; Royal academies: Spanish; History; Fine Arts of San Fernando; Exact, Physical and Natural Sciences; Moral and Political Sciences; and Medicine.; Universities: Madrid, Barcelona, Granada, Havana, Oviedo, Salamanca, Santiago, Seville, Valencia, Valladolid, and Zaragoza.; Economic societies of Friends of the Country: Madrid, Barcelona, Havana–Puerto Rico, León, Seville, and Valencia.) each elected by their own qualified electors or delegates. Another 180 seats consisted of senators in their own right (such as the monarch's offspring and the heir apparent once coming of age (16), grandees of Spain with an income of Pts 60,000, certain general officers—captain generals and admirals—the Patriarch of the Indies and archbishops, and the heads of higher courts and state institutions (Note: These comprised the Council of State, the Supreme Court, the Court of Auditors and the Supreme Council of War and Navy.) after two years of service), as well as senators for life directly appointed by the monarch.

The law provided for by-elections to fill vacant seats during the legislative term. At least two vacancies were required to trigger a by-election in Congress multi-member constituencies; when only two vacancies were to be filled, voters could choose only one candidate.

== Candidates ==
=== Nomination rules ===
For the Congress, secular Spanish males of voting age, with full civil rights, could run for election. Causes of ineligibility applied to those excluded from voting and to former slaves in Cuba until ten years after becoming freedmen, as well as to:

- Public contractors, within their relevant territories and up to one year after the end of their contracts;
- Holders of a number of territorial posts (such as government-appointed positions, not including Central Administration employees; local and provincial employees; certain technical officials—civil, mining and forest engineers—and presidents of polling stations), within their areas of jurisdiction, during their term of office and up to one year afterwards;
- Holders of any government-appointed post between the election call and election day, for those seeking a seat through cumulative voting.

For the Senate, eligibility was limited to Spanish males over 35 years of age not under criminal prosecution, disfranchisement nor asset seizure, and who either qualified as senators in their own right or belonged (or had belonged) to certain categories:

- Provided an income of Pts 7,500: the presidents of the Senate and the Congress; deputies serving in three different congresses or eight terms; government ministers; bishops; grandees of Spain not eligible as senators in their own right; and various senior officials after two years of service (such as certain general officers—lieutenant generals and vice admirals—and members of higher courts and state institutions); heads of diplomatic missions abroad (ambassadors after two years, and plenipotentiaries after four); heads and full academics in the royal academies; chief engineers; and full professors with four years of service;
- Provided an income of Pts 20,000 or being taxpayers with a minimum quota of Pts 4,000 in direct taxes (paid two years in advance): Spanish nobility; and former deputies, provincial deputies or mayors in provincial capitals or towns over 20,000;
- Having served as senators before the promulgation of the 1876 Constitution.

Other ineligibility provisions for the Senate also applied to a number of territorial officials within their areas of jurisdiction, during their term of office and up to three months afterwards; public contractors; tax collectors; and public debtors.

Incompatibility rules barred representing multiple constituencies simultaneously, as well as combining:

- The role of senator with other legislative roles (deputy, senator and local councillor, except those in Madrid; and provincial deputies within their respective provinces); or with any public post not explicitly permitted under Senate eligibility requirements;
- The role of deputy with any other civil, military or judicial post, with exceptions—and as many as 40 deputies allowed to simultaneously benefit from these—including a number of specific posts based in Madrid, such as any of the aforementioned ones (provided a public salary of Pts 12,500); senior court officials; university authorities and professors; chief engineers; and general officers.

== Results ==
=== Congress of Deputies ===
==== Overall ====
Mainland Spain

← Summary of the 21 August 1881 Congress of Deputies election results →
Parties and alliances	Popular vote		Seats
Parties and alliances	Votes	%	Seats
Liberal Fusionist Party (Fusionistas)			297
Liberal Conservative Party (Conservadores)			48
Progressive–Possibilist Democrats (Demócratas)			32
Democratic Progressive Party (PPD)			12
Democratic Party (PD)			10
Independent Monarchist Progressives (Prog.i)			10
Catholic Union (UC)			3
Traditionalists (Tradicionalistas)			2
Fuerist Party of the Basque Union (PFUV)			1
Independents (Independientes)			9
Total	604,758		392
Votes cast / turnout	604,758	71.40	
Abstentions	242,203	28.60	
Registered voters	846,961		

Seats
Fusionist	75.77%
Conservative	12.24%
Democratic	8.16%
UC	0.77%
Traditionalist	0.51%
PFUV	0.26%
Independent	2.30%

Cuba

← Summary of the 21 August 1881 Congress of Deputies election results in Cuba →
Parties and alliances	Popular vote		Seats
Parties and alliances	Votes	%	Seats
Constitutional Union Party (Unión Conservadora)			18
Liberal Party (Liberal)			4
Progressive Liberal Party (Liberal Progresista)			2
Total			24
Votes cast / turnout			
Abstentions			
Registered voters	31,295		

Seats
Const. Union	75.00%
Liberal	16.67%
Prog. Liberal	8.33%

==== Elected deputies ====
The following table lists the elected deputies:

Province	Constituency	Elected member	Allegiance
Álava	Amurrio	Lucas Urquijo y Urrutia	Fusionist
Álava	Vitoria	Ramón Ortiz de Zárate Martínez de Galarreta	Traditionalist
Albacete	Albacete	José Salamanca y Mayol	Conservative
Albacete	Alcaraz	Antonio Ortiz y Ustáriz	Fusionist
Albacete	Almansa	José Mateo Sagasta y Vidal	Fusionist
Albacete	Casas-Ibáñez	Federico Ochando y Chumillas	Fusionist
Albacete	Hellín	Federico López y Gaviria	Fusionist
Alicante	Alcoy	Miguel Martínez de Campos y Antón	Fusionist
Alicante	Alicante	Enrique Arroyo y Rodríguez	Fusionist
Alicante	Alicante	Eleuterio Maisonnave Cutayar	Possibilist
Alicante	Alicante	Adrián Viudes Girón	Fusionist
Alicante	Denia	Leopoldo Laussat y Christiernim	Fusionist
Alicante	Dolores	Manuel González Llana	Fusionist
Alicante	Orihuela	Trinitario Ruiz Capdepón	Fusionist
Alicante	Pego	Enrique Bushell y Laussat	Fusionist
Alicante	Villajoyosa	Alejandro Groizard y Gómez de la Serna	Fusionist
Alicante	Villena	Federico Bas y Moró	Fusionist
Almería	Almería	Carlos Huelin Larrain	Fusionist
Almería	Almería	Sebastián Pérez García	Fusionist
Almería	Almería	Bernardo Toro y Moya	Conservative
Almería	Berja	Miguel de Trell y Chacón	Fusionist
Almería	Purchena	Antonio Martín Toro	Fusionist
Almería	Sorbas	Carlos Navarro y Rodrigo	Fusionist
Almería	Vélez-Rubio	Agustín de la Serna y López	Fusionist
Almería	Vera	Juan Anglada y Ruiz	Possibilist
Ávila	Arenas de San Pedro	Zoilo Pérez García	Fusionist
Ávila	Arévalo	Jorge Montalvo y Vega	Fusionist
Ávila	Ávila	Celestino Rico y García	Fusionist
Ávila	Piedrahíta	Francisco Silvela y de Le Vielleuze	Conservative
Badajoz	Almendralejo	Abdón de Salamanca	Fusionist
Badajoz	Badajoz	Eduardo Baselga y Chaves	Progressive
Badajoz	Badajoz	Leopoldo Molano y Martínez	Fusionist
Badajoz	Badajoz	Carlos María Stuart Fitz-James y Portocarrero	Fusionist
Badajoz	Castuera	Ricardo Fernández Blanco y Moral	Fusionist
Badajoz	Don Benito	Santiago Solo de Zaldívar	Fusionist
Badajoz	Fregenal de la Sierra	Cecilio de Lora y Castro	Fusionist
Badajoz	Llerena	Ulpiano González de Olañeta y González de Ocampo	Fusionist
Badajoz	Mérida	José de Castro y López	Fusionist
Badajoz	Villanueva de la Serena	Mariano Fernández Daza Gómez Bravo	Fusionist
Balearics	Ibiza	Cipriano Garijo y Aljama	Fusionist
Balearics	Mahón	Juan Tremol y Faner	Fusionist
Balearics	Palma	José Cotoner Allendesalazar	Conservative
Balearics	Palma	Joaquín Fiol y Pujol	Possibilist
Balearics	Palma	Mateo Gamundí y Monserrat	Fusionist
Balearics	Palma	Antonio Maura Montaner	Fusionist
Balearics	Palma	Enrique de Mesa y Moya	Fusionist
Barcelona	Arenys de Mar	Enrique de Orozco y de la Puente	Fusionist
Barcelona	Barcelona	Teodoro Baró y Sureda	Fusionist
Barcelona	Barcelona	Emilio Castelar y Ripoll	Possibilist
Barcelona	Barcelona	Camilo Fabra Fontanills	Fusionist
Barcelona	Barcelona	Federico Marcet	Fusionist
Barcelona	Barcelona	Antonio Roger y Vidal	Fusionist
Barcelona	Berga	Joaquín Marín y Carbonell	Conservative
Barcelona	Castelltersol	Antonio Rodó y Casanova	Fusionist
Barcelona	Gracia	Vicente de Romero y Baldrich	Fusionist
Barcelona	Granollers	Antonio Ferratges de Mesa Ballester	Fusionist
Barcelona	Igualada	Bartolomé Godó y Pié	Fusionist
Barcelona	Manresa	José Mas y Martínez	Fusionist
Barcelona	Mataró	Francisco Taulina y Garriga	Fusionist
Barcelona	San Feliú de Llobregat	Miguel Elías Marchal	Fusionist
Barcelona	Tarrassa	Joaquín Planas Borrell	Fusionist
Barcelona	Vich	Pedro Bosch y Labrús	Conservative
Barcelona	Villafranca del Panadés	Francisco de Asís Madorell y Badía	Fusionist
Barcelona	Villanueva y Geltrú	Víctor Balaguer y Cirera	Fusionist
Biscay	Balmaseda	Ricardo Balparda y Fernández	Fusionist
Biscay	Bilbao	Eduardo de Aguirre y Labroche	Fusionist
Biscay	Durango	José María Ampuero y Jáuregui	Traditionalist
Biscay	Guernica	Ángel Allendesalazar y Muñoz de Salazar	Fusionist
Burgos	Aranda de Duero	Manuel Macías y Boiguez	Fusionist
Burgos	Burgos	Manuel Alonso Martínez	Fusionist
Burgos	Burgos	Pedro González Marrón	Fusionist
Burgos	Burgos	Joaquín López-Dóriga y Ruiz de la Escalera	Conservative
Burgos	Castrojeriz	Manuel Alonso Martínez	Fusionist
Burgos	Miranda de Ebro	Gabriel Salcedo Anguiano	Conservative
Burgos	Salas de los Infantes	Pedro González Marrón	Fusionist
Burgos	Villarcayo	Manuel María del Valle y Cárdenas	Fusionist
Cáceres	Alcántara	Jacinto Burgos Meneses	Fusionist
Cáceres	Cáceres	Manuel Falcó y Osorio d'Adda y Gutiérrez de los Ríos	Fusionist
Cáceres	Coria	Julián de Zugasti y Sáenz	Fusionist
Cáceres	Hoyos	Joaquín González Fiori	Fusionist
Cáceres	Navalmoral de la Mata	Urbano González Serrano	Progressive
Cáceres	Plasencia	Ramón Rodríguez Leal	Fusionist
Cáceres	Trujillo	Manuel María Grande y Valdés	Fusionist
Cádiz	Algeciras	José González de la Vega	Fusionist
Cádiz	Cádiz	José González de la Vega	Fusionist
Cádiz	Cádiz	Carlos Rodríguez Batista	Fusionist
Cádiz	Cádiz	Eduardo Genovés y Puig	Conservative
Cádiz	Grazalema	Francisco Ruiz Martínez	Conservative
Cádiz	Jerez de la Frontera	José Gutiérrez Agüera	Fusionist
Cádiz	Jerez de la Frontera	Pedro José Moreno Rodríguez	Possibilist
Cádiz	Jerez de la Frontera	Manuel Sánchez Mira	Fusionist
Cádiz	Medina-Sidonia	Antonio Álvarez Jiménez	Fusionist
Cádiz	Puerto de Santa María	Pedro Majón y Merjelina	Fusionist
Canaries	Guía	Fernando de León y Castillo	Fusionist
Canaries	Las Palmas	Pedro Bravo de Laguna y Joven	Conservative
Canaries	Santa Cruz de La Palma	Miguel Castañeda y Carmona	Fusionist
Canaries	Santa Cruz de Tenerife	Juan García Torres	Fusionist
Canaries	Santa Cruz de Tenerife	Feliciano Pérez Zamora	Fusionist
Canaries	Santa Cruz de Tenerife	Miguel Villalba Hervás	Possibilist
Castellón	Albocácer	Carlos Espinosa de los Monteros Sagaseta de Ilurdoz	Fusionist
Castellón	Castellón de la Plana	Gaspar Núñez de Arce	Fusionist
Castellón	Lucena del Cid	José María Tuero y Madrid	Fusionist
Castellón	Morella	Juan de Mata Zorita	Fusionist
Castellón	Nules	Ricardo García Trapero Veragua	Fusionist
Castellón	Segorbe	José Escrig y Font	Fusionist
Castellón	Vinaroz	Jerónimo Antón Ramírez	Fusionist
Ciudad Real	Alcázar de San Juan	Ramón Baillo y Marañón	Fusionist
Ciudad Real	Almadén	Luis Felipe Aguilera y Rodríguez	Progressive
Ciudad Real	Almagro	Federico de Soria Santa Cruz	Fusionist
Ciudad Real	Ciudad Real	Luis del Rey y Medrano	Fusionist
Ciudad Real	Daimiel	Emilio Nieto y Pérez	Progressive
Ciudad Real	Villanueva de los Infantes	José Antonio Gutiérrez de la Vega	Fusionist
Córdoba	Cabra	Juan Ulloa y Valera	Progressive
Córdoba	Córdoba	Antonio Garijo y Lara	Fusionist
Córdoba	Córdoba	Santos Isasa y Valseca	Conservative
Córdoba	Córdoba	Ángel Losada y Fernández de Liencres	Fusionist
Córdoba	Hinojosa del Duque	Félix García Gómez de la Serna	Fusionist
Córdoba	Lucena	Juan Chinchilla Díaz de Oñate	Fusionist
Córdoba	Montilla	Antonio Aguilar y Correa	Fusionist
Córdoba	Posadas	Juan Calvo de León y Benjumea	Fusionist
Córdoba	Priego	Juan Manuel Sánchez y Gutiérrez de Castro	Fusionist
Cuenca	Cañete	Julián Casildo Arribas y Arauz	Conservative
Cuenca	Cuenca	Leandro Rubio Martínez	Fusionist
Cuenca	Huete	Gumersindo Redondo Martínez	Fusionist
Cuenca	Motilla del Palancar	Manuel Núñez de Haro	Fusionist
Cuenca	San Clemente	Manuel Becerra Bermúdez	Progressive
Cuenca	Tarancón	Francisco Rubio y Pablos	Conservative
Gerona	Figueras	Manuel Henrich y Girona	Fusionist
Gerona	Gerona	Juan Fabra y Floreta	Fusionist
Gerona	La Bisbal	Francisco Sala y Pou	Fusionist
Gerona	Olot	Pedro Diz Romero	Fusionist
Gerona	Puigcerdá	Félix Maciá y Bonaplata	Fusionist
Gerona	Santa Coloma de Farnés	Antonio Mataró y Villalonga	Fusionist
Gerona	Torroella de Montgrí	Alberto Quintana y Combis	Fusionist
Gerona	Vilademuls	José Álvarez Mariño	Conservative
Granada	Albuñol	José María Arroyo y Cobo	Fusionist
Granada	Alhama	Emilio Zayas y Trujillo	Fusionist
Granada	Baza	Nicolás Aravaca y Vázquez	Fusionist
Granada	Granada	Melchor Almagro Díaz	Possibilist
Granada	Granada	Francisco Javier Gosalvez	Fusionist
Granada	Granada	Francisco Pérez del Pulgar	Fusionist
Granada	Guadix	Juan Montilla y Adán	Fusionist
Granada	Huéscar	José Carreño de la Cuadra	Fusionist
Granada	Loja	Francisco Ruiz Villegas	Fusionist
Granada	Motril	Gaspar Esteva Moreu	Fusionist
Granada	Órgiva	Fernando Escavias de Carvajal y Sandoval	Fusionist
Guadalajara	Brihuega	José González y González Blanco	Fusionist
Guadalajara	Guadalajara	Ramón Rodríguez Correa	Fusionist
Guadalajara	Molina	Francisco García Martino	Fusionist
Guadalajara	Pastrana	Gabriel de la Puerta y Ródenas	Fusionist
Guadalajara	Sigüenza	Rafael Ruiz Martínez	Fusionist
Guipúzcoa	Azpeitia	Joaquín de Vera y Olazábal	Catholic Union
Guipúzcoa	San Sebastián	Pedro Nolasco Sagredo y Ansoategui	Fusionist
Guipúzcoa	Tolosa	Joaquín Gorostegui y Garagarza	Fusionist
Guipúzcoa	Vergara	Iván Aranguren y Alzaga	Fusionist
Huelva	Aracena	Sebastián García Ramírez	Fusionist
Huelva	Huelva	Luis Page y Blake	Fusionist
Huelva	La Palma	Cayetano Leygonier y Márquez	Fusionist
Huelva	Valverde del Camino	Manuel Pérez Seoane y Marín	Fusionist
Huesca	Barbastro	Estanislao de Antonio y Garauto	Fusionist
Huesca	Benabarre	Manuel León Moncasi y Castel	Progressive
Huesca	Boltaña	Ramón de La Cadena y Laguna	Fusionist
Huesca	Fraga	Félix Coll y Moncasi	Fusionist
Huesca	Huesca	Emilio Castelar y Ripoll	Possibilist
Huesca	Jaca	Manuel Gavín y Estaún	Fusionist
Huesca	Sariñena	Salvador Bayona y Santamaría	Fusionist
Jaén	Baeza	Pedro Manuel Acuña y Espinosa de los Monteros	Fusionist
Jaén	Cazorla	José Serrano y Aizpurúa	Fusionist
Jaén	Jaén	José María Campos y Martínez	Fusionist
Jaén	Jaén	Antonio Ferrer y Martínez	Fusionist
Jaén	Jaén	Teodoro Robles y Arjona	Fusionist
Jaén	La Carolina	Juan de Dios Sanjuan y Labrador	Fusionist
Jaén	Martos	Eduardo León y Llerena	Fusionist
Jaén	Úbeda	Francisco Javier Girón y Aragón	Fusionist
Jaén	Villacarrillo	Carlos Navarro y Rodrigo	Fusionist
La Coruña	Arzúa	Benito María Hermida y Verea	Fusionist
La Coruña	Betanzos	Antonio Vázquez y López Amor	Fusionist
La Coruña	Corcubión	Juan Nido Segalerva	Fusionist
La Coruña	El Ferrol	Nicasio Pérez López	Fusionist
La Coruña	La Coruña	Enrique Fernández Alsina	Progressive
La Coruña	La Coruña	Aureliano Linares Rivas	Fusionist
La Coruña	La Coruña	Antonio del Moral y López	Fusionist
La Coruña	Muros	Manuel Batanero Montenegro	Conservative
La Coruña	Noya	Antonio Romero Ortiz	Fusionist
La Coruña	Padrón	Eduardo Gasset y Artime	Progressive
La Coruña	Puentedeume	Daniel Rodríguez y Rodríguez	Fusionist
La Coruña	Santa María de Órdenes	Pedro Calderón de la Barca Herce y Collantes	Fusionist
La Coruña	Santa Marta de Ortigueira	Vicente Donato Villarnovo López	Fusionist
La Coruña	Santiago	Adolfo Forrado y Ozores	Fusionist
León	Astorga	Pío Gullón Iglesias	Fusionist
León	La Bañeza	Emilio Pérez Villanueva	Fusionist
León	La Vecilla	Juan Piñán y Alonso de la Barcena	Fusionist
León	León	Dámaso Merino Villarino	Fusionist
León	Murias de Paredes	Manuel Rodríguez y Rodríguez	Possibilist
León	Ponferrada	Daniel Valdés Barrio	Progressive
León	Sahagún	Lesmes Franco del Corral	Fusionist
León	Valencia de Don Juan	Demetrio Alonso Castrillo	Fusionist
León	Villafranca del Bierzo	Enrique García Ceñal	Fusionist
Lérida	Borjas	Jaime Nuet y Minguell	Fusionist
Lérida	Balaguer	Francisco Martínez Brau	Fusionist
Lérida	Cervera	Manuel Alonso Martínez	Fusionist
Lérida	Lérida	Jaime Nuet y Minguell	Fusionist
Lérida	Seo de Urgel	Isidro Boixader y Solana	Fusionist
Lérida	Solsona	Manuel de Azcárraga y Palmero	Fusionist
Lérida	Sort	Luis de León y Cataumber	Fusionist
Lérida	Tremp	Rafael Cabezas y Montemayor	Conservative
Logroño	Arnedo	José Alonso y Morales de Setién	Fusionist
Logroño	Logroño	Tirso Timoteo Rodrigáñez y Mateo Sagasta	Fusionist
Logroño	Santo Domingo de la Calzada	Rafael Barrio y Ruiz Vidal	Fusionist
Logroño	Torrecilla en Cameros	Lorenzo de Codés y García	Fusionist
Lugo	Becerreá	Manuel Becerra Bermúdez	Progressive
Lugo	Chantada	Manuel Somoza de la Peña	Fusionist
Lugo	Fonsagrada	Pegerto Pardo Balmonte y Gil	Fusionist
Lugo	Lugo	Fernando Cos-Gayón y Pons	Conservative
Lugo	Lugo	Benigno Quiroga López Ballesteros	Fusionist
Lugo	Lugo	Manuel da Riba do Rego	Fusionist
Lugo	Mondoñedo	Cándido Martínez Montenegro	Fusionist
Lugo	Monforte	Rafael López de Lago y Blanco	Conservative
Lugo	Quiroga	Vicente Quiroga Vázquez	Fusionist
Lugo	Ribadeo	Eduardo Pardo Montenegro y Montenegro	Fusionist
Lugo	Vivero	Francisco Sanz Riobó	Fusionist
Madrid	Alcalá de Henares	Inocente Ortiz y Casado	Fusionist
Madrid	Chinchón	Manuel Ibarra y Cruz	Fusionist
Madrid	Getafe	Joaquín López Puigcerver	Progressive
Madrid	Madrid	Santiago de Angulo Ortiz de Traspeña	Fusionist
Madrid	Madrid	Pío Bermejillo e Ibarra	Fusionist
Madrid	Madrid	Antonio Cánovas del Castillo	Conservative
Madrid	Madrid	Ventura García-Sancho Ibarrondo	Fusionist
Madrid	Madrid	Pedro Martínez Luna	Fusionist
Madrid	Madrid	José Posada Herrera	Fusionist
Madrid	Madrid	Rafael Reig y Bigne	Fusionist
Madrid	Madrid	Francisco Romero Robledo	Conservative
Madrid	Navalcarnero	Luis Moreno Pérez	Fusionist
Madrid	Torrelaguna	Cirilo Fernández de la Hoz y Rey	Fusionist
Málaga	Antequera	Francisco Romero Robledo	Conservative
Málaga	Archidona	Juan Facundo Riaño y Montero	Fusionist
Málaga	Campillos	Adrián Risueño Pradas	Fusionist
Málaga	Coín	José López Domínguez	Fusionist
Málaga	Gaucín	José de Carvajal y Hué	Progressive
Málaga	Málaga	Antonio Cánovas del Castillo	Conservative
Málaga	Málaga	Bernabé Dávila y Bertololi	Fusionist
Málaga	Málaga	Juan Larios Enríquez	Fusionist
Málaga	Ronda	Cristóbal Rodríguez de los Ríos	Fusionist
Málaga	Torrox	Román Laá y Rute	Fusionist
Málaga	Vélez-Málaga	Luis de Rute y Giner	Fusionist
Murcia	Cartagena	Salvador Albacete y Albert	Conservative
Murcia	Cartagena	Manuel Cassola Fernández	Fusionist
Murcia	Cartagena	Julián Pagán y Ayuso	Fusionist
Murcia	Cieza	Antonio Cánovas del Castillo	Conservative
Murcia	Lorca	Juan Utor y Fernández	Fusionist
Murcia	Mula	Francisco D'Estoup y Garcerán	Fusionist
Murcia	Murcia	José Gómez Díez	Fusionist
Murcia	Murcia	Diego González Conde y González	Conservative
Murcia	Murcia	Pedro Pagán y Ayuso	Fusionist
Murcia	Yecla	José Alcalde Fernández	Fusionist
Navarre	Aoiz	José Manuel Urzainqui Surio	Fusionist
Navarre	Estella	Fructuoso de Miguel Mauleón	Fusionist
Navarre	Pamplona	Luis Díez de Ulzurrun y López de Ceráin	Fusionist
Navarre	Pamplona	Enrique Larrainzar y Ezcurra	Fusionist
Navarre	Pamplona	Gregorio Zabalza Olaso	Fusionist
Navarre	Tafalla	Ramón María Badarán y Echávarri	Fusionist
Navarre	Tudela	Luis Martos y Potestad	Conservative
Orense	Bande	Saturnino Álvarez Bugallal	Conservative
Orense	Carballino	Eduardo Quiroga Pérez	Fusionist
Orense	Celanova	Joaquín Becerra Armesto	Fusionist
Orense	Ginzo de Limia	Ramón Barrio y Ruiz Vidal	Fusionist
Orense	Orense	Vicente Pérez y Pérez	Fusionist
Orense	Puebla de Trives	Gil María Fabra y Deas	Fusionist
Orense	Ribadavia	Adolfo Merelles Caula	Fusionist
Orense	Valdeorras	Manuel Quiroga Vázquez	Conservative
Orense	Verín	Ramón Blanco-Rajoy Poyán	Fusionist
Oviedo	Avilés	Julián García San Miguel y Zaldúa	Progressive
Oviedo	Belmonte	Faustino Allende Valledor	Fusionist
Oviedo	Cangas de Tineo	Francisco de Borja Queipo de Llano y Gayoso de los Cobos	Conservative
Oviedo	Castropol	Dionisio Pinedo Luis Blanco	Fusionist
Oviedo	Gijón	Hilario Nava y Caveda	Conservative
Oviedo	Infiesto	Bernardino Díaz de Rivera	Fusionist
Oviedo	Luarca	Ventura Olavarrieta	Fusionist
Oviedo	Llanes	José Posada Herrera	Fusionist
Oviedo	Oviedo	José María Bernaldo de Quirós y González Cienfuegos	Fusionist
Oviedo	Oviedo	Manuel Pedregal y Cañedo	Progressive
Oviedo	Oviedo	Luis Pidal y Mon	Catholic Union
Oviedo	Pravia	Constantino Fernández Vallín y Álvarez de Albuerne	Fusionist
Oviedo	Tineo	Antonio Sánchez Campomanes	Fusionist
Oviedo	Villaviciosa	Alejandro Pidal y Mon	Catholic Union
Palencia	Astudillo	Eugenio García Ruiz	Progressive
Palencia	Carrión de los Condes	Francisco de la Pisa Pajares	Fusionist
Palencia	Cervera de Pisuerga	Luis Polanco Labandero	Progressive
Palencia	Palencia	Saturnino Esteban Miguel y Collantes	Conservative
Palencia	Saldaña	Mariano Osorio de Lamadrid	Fusionist
Pontevedra	Caldas de Reyes	Hipólito Rodrigáñez y Mateo Sagasta	Fusionist
Pontevedra	Cambados	Rafael Antonio de Orense y Figueroa	Fusionist
Pontevedra	Estrada	José María Riestra López	Fusionist
Pontevedra	La Cañiza	Luis Rodríguez Seoane	Fusionist
Pontevedra	Lalín	Fernando de Valderrama y Martínez	Fusionist
Pontevedra	Pontevedra	Antonio Aguilar y Correa	Fusionist
Pontevedra	Puenteareas	Constantino Armesto y Cobián	Fusionist
Pontevedra	Puente Caldelas	Raimundo Fernández-Villaverde y García Rivero	Conservative
Pontevedra	Redondela	Manuel Ruiz Higuero	Fusionist
Pontevedra	Tuy	Ezequiel Ordóñez González	Conservative
Pontevedra	Vigo	Ángel Urzaiz y Cuesta	Fusionist
Salamanca	Béjar	Jerónimo Rodríguez Yagüe	Fusionist
Salamanca	Ciudad Rodrigo	Luis Sánchez-Arjona y Velasco	Fusionist
Salamanca	Ledesma	Luis Aparicio y López	Fusionist
Salamanca	Peñaranda de Bracamonte	Manuel Ávila Ruano	Fusionist
Salamanca	Salamanca	José García Solís	Fusionist
Salamanca	Sequeros	José María Espinosa y Villapecellín	Fusionist
Salamanca	Vitigudino	Manuel de Aguilera y Gamboa	Fusionist
Santander	Cabuérniga	Federico de la Viesca de la Sierra	Fusionist
Santander	Laredo	Manuel de Eguilior y Llaguno	Fusionist
Santander	Santander	Estanislao Abarca Flejo	Fusionist
Santander	Santander	Fidel García Lomás	Fusionist
Santander	Santander	Modesto Martínez Pacheco	Possibilist
Segovia	Cuéllar	Ángel José Luis Carvajal y Fernández de Córdoba	Progressive
Segovia	Riaza	José Oñate y Valcarce	Conservative
Segovia	Santa María de Nieva	José Oñate y Ruiz	Fusionist
Segovia	Segovia	Hipólito Finat y Leguizamón	Conservative
Seville	Carmona	Eduardo Bermúdez y Reina	Fusionist
Seville	Cazalla de la Sierra	Ignacio Sánchez Martínez	Fusionist
Seville	Écija	Juan Bautista Ávila y Fernández	Fusionist
Seville	Estepa	Pablo Cruz y Orgaz	Fusionist
Seville	Marchena	Francisco de Paula Candau y Acosta	Fusionist
Seville	Morón de la Frontera	José Corbacho Reina	Fusionist
Seville	Sanlúcar la Mayor	Fernando de Silva y Valle	Fusionist
Seville	Seville	José Luis Albareda y Sezde	Fusionist
Seville	Seville	Joaquín Alcaide y Molina	Fusionist
Seville	Seville	Antonio María Fabie y Escudero	Fusionist
Seville	Seville	Federico Sánchez Bedoya	Conservative
Seville	Utrera	Eduardo Surga y León	Fusionist
Soria	Almazán	José de Mesa y Flores	Fusionist
Soria	Agreda	Ángel Tutor y Sanz	Fusionist
Soria	El Burgo de Osma	Justo San Miguel Barona	Progressive
Soria	Soria	José Canalejas y Méndez	Fusionist
Tarragona	Gandesa	Pedro Antonio Torres Jordi	Fusionist
Tarragona	Roquetas	Alberto Bosch y Fustegueras	Conservative
Tarragona	Tarragona	Pedro Nolasco Gay Sardá	Fusionist
Tarragona	Tarragona	Federico Pons y Montells	Fusionist
Tarragona	Tarragona	Mariano Rius y Espina Montaner	Progressive
Tarragona	Tortosa	José Bosch y Carbonell	Fusionist
Tarragona	Valls	José Castellet y Sampso	Fusionist
Tarragona	Vendrell	Juan Cañellas y Tomás	Fusionist
Teruel	Albarracín	Carlos Rivera y Julián	Fusionist
Teruel	Alcañiz	Manuel de Pedro Esmir	Fusionist
Teruel	Montalbán	Fernando O'Lawlor y Caballero	Fusionist
Teruel	Mora de Rubielos	Antonio Igual y Gil	Progressive
Teruel	Teruel	Francisco Rodríguez del Rey	Fusionist
Teruel	Valderrobres	Juan José Gasca Ballabriga	Fusionist
Toledo	Illescas	Isidoro Recio y Sánchez de Ipola	Fusionist
Toledo	Ocaña	Venancio González y Fernández	Fusionist
Toledo	Orgaz	Segismundo Moret y Prendergast	Progressive
Toledo	Puente del Arzobispo	Rufino Mansi y Bonilla	Fusionist
Toledo	Quintanar de la Orden	Alfonso González y Lozano	Fusionist
Toledo	Talavera de la Reina	Ángel Mansi y Bonilla	Fusionist
Toledo	Toledo	José Pérez Caballero y Posada	Fusionist
Toledo	Torrijos	Manuel Benayas Portocarrero	Fusionist
Valencia	Albaida	José Iranzo y Presencia	Fusionist
Valencia	Alcira	Joaquín Martín de Olías	Possibilist
Valencia	Chelva	Manuel de Salamanca y Negrete	Fusionist
Valencia	Chiva	José Busutil Barberá	Fusionist
Valencia	Enguera	Carlos Testor y Pascual	Fusionist
Valencia	Gandia	José Cort y Gosálvez	Fusionist
Valencia	Játiva	Cirilo Amorós Pastor	Moderate
Valencia	Liria	Enrique de Villarroya y Llorens	Fusionist
Valencia	Requena	Ricardo García Martínez	Fusionist
Valencia	Sagunto	Mariano Ros Carsi	Fusionist
Valencia	Sueca	Rafael Sarthou y Calvo	Fusionist
Valencia	Torrente	Jacobo Sales Reig	Fusionist
Valencia	Valencia	Rafael Atard y Llobell	Progressive
Valencia	Valencia	Vicente Chapa y Olmos	Fusionist
Valencia	Valencia	Cristino Martos Balbi	Progressive
Valladolid	Medina del Campo	Germán Gamazo y Calvo	Fusionist
Valladolid	Nava del Rey	Juan Muñoz y Vargas	Fusionist
Valladolid	Valladolid	Miguel Alonso Pesquera	Conservative
Valladolid	Valladolid	Germán Gamazo y Calvo	Fusionist
Valladolid	Valladolid	José Nieto Álvarez	Fusionist
Valladolid	Villalón de Campos	Ángel de la Riva Espiga	Fusionist
Zamora	Alcañices	Felipe Padierna de Villapadierna y Muñiz	Fusionist
Zamora	Benavente	Enrique Tordesillas y O'Donnell	Fusionist
Zamora	Puebla de Sanabria	Felipe Rodríguez y Rodríguez	Fusionist
Zamora	Toro	José de León y Molina	Fusionist
Zamora	Villalpando	Ricardo Muñiz Viglietti	Fusionist
Zamora	Zamora	Práxedes Mateo Sagasta y Escolar	Fusionist
Zaragoza	Belchite	Miguel Sinues Lezaun	Fusionist
Zaragoza	Calatayud	Celestino Aranda y Jiménez	Fusionist
Zaragoza	Caspe	Juan Mompeón y Goser	Fusionist
Zaragoza	Daroca	Manuel Ballesteros y Contín	Fusionist
Zaragoza	Ejea de los Caballeros	Mariano Arredondo y Collar	Fusionist
Zaragoza	La Almunia	Rafael Serrano de Acebrón	Fusionist
Zaragoza	Tarazona	Emilio Navarro y Ochoteco	Fusionist
Zaragoza	Zaragoza	Tomás Castellano y Villarroya	Conservative
Zaragoza	Zaragoza	Joaquín Gil Berges	Possibilist
Zaragoza	Zaragoza	Juan Salvador Herrando	Fusionist
Cumulative voting		Eugenio Montero Ríos	Fusionist

By-elections

Constituency	Date	Elected member	Allegiance	Cause
Puebla de Sanabria	4 November 1881	Felipe Rodríguez y Rodríguez	Fusionist	Incapacitation of Felipe Rodríguez y Rodríguez
Algeciras	27 November 1881	José González Roncero	Fusionist	Incapacitation of José González de la Vega
Cáceres	4 December 1881	Manuel Falcó y Osorio d'Adda y Gutiérrez de los Ríos	Fusionist	Nullification of the election of Manuel Falcó y Osorio d'Adda
Mataró	4 December 1881	José García Oliver	Fusionist	Incapacitation of Francisco Taulina y Garriga
Salas de los Infantes	29 January 1882	Enrique Santana López	Fusionist	Resignation of Pedro González Marrón
Castrojeriz	5 February 1882	Andrés Caballero y Muguiro	Fusionist	Resignation of Manuel Alonso Martínez
Carmona	23 April 1882	Eduardo Bermúdez y Reina	Fusionist	Resignation of Eduardo Bermúdez y Reina
Lucena del Cid	23 April 1882	Emilio Sánchez Pastor	Fusionist	Death of José María Tuero y Madrid
Huéscar	30 April 1882	José Carreño de la Cuadra	Fusionist	Resignation of José Carreño de la Cuadra
Nava del Rey	7 May 1882	Pedro Antonio Pimentel Arévalo	Fusionist	Resignation of Juan Muñoz y Vargas
Dolores	21 May 1882	José de Granda González	Fusionist	Resignation of Manuel González Llana
Lérida	21 May 1882	José María Celleruelo y Poviones	Possibilist	Choice of Borjas by Jaime Nuet y Minguell
Benabarre	2 July 1882	Francisco Moncasi y Castel	Conservative	Death of Manuel León Moncasi y Castel
Ribadeo	2 July 1882	Rafael Monares Insa	Fusionist	Death of Eduardo Pardo Montenegro y Montenegro
La Almunia	9 July 1882	José Ferreras Toro	Fusionist	Death of Rafael Serrano de Acebrón
Chelva	16 July 1882	Manuel de Salamanca y Negrete	Fusionist	Resignation of Manuel de Salamanca y Negrete
Grazalema	6 August 1882	Leandro Antolín Ruiz Martínez	Conservative	Resignation of Francisco Ruiz Martínez
Gandesa	20 August 1882	Pedro Antonio Torres Jordi	Fusionist	Resignation of Pedro Antonio Torres Jordi
Orihuela	20 August 1882	Trinitario Ruiz Capdepón	Fusionist	Resignation of Trinitario Ruiz Capdepón
Alcalá de Henares	21 January 1883	Inocente Ortiz y Casado	Fusionist	Resignation of Inocente Ortiz y Casado
La Vecilla	4 February 1883	Ricardo Muñoz Viglietti	Unknown	Death of Juan Piñán y Alonso de la Barcena
Sagunto	4 February 1883	Federico Loygorri de la Torre	Fusionist	Death of Mariano Ros Carsi
Torroella de Montgrí	26 February 1883	Alberto Quintana y Combis	Fusionist	Resignation of Alberto Quintana y Combis
Boltaña	4 March 1883	Ramón de La Cadena y Laguna	Fusionist	Resignation of Ramón de La Cadena y Laguna
Ciudad Real	4 March 1883	Luis del Rey y Medrano	Fusionist	Resignation of Luis del Rey y Medrano
Tarazona	4 March 1883	Emilio Navarro y Ochoteco	Fusionist	Resignation of Emilio Navarro y Ochoteco
Albacete	11 March 1883	Fernando Salamanca y Livermore	Fusionist	Death of José Salamanca y Mayol
La Bisbal	18 March 1883	Alberto Camps y Armet	Conservative	Nullification of the election of Francisco Sala y Pou
Alcaraz	25 March 1883	Octavio Cuartero Cifuentes	Fusionist	Resignation of Antonio Ortiz y Ustáriz
Astudillo	25 March 1883	Lorenzo García Benito	Fusionist	Death of Eugenio García Ruiz
Chantada	25 March 1883	Isidro Aguado y Mora	Fusionist	Resignation of Manuel Somoza de la Peña
Cuenca	25 March 1883	Joaquín María Girón y Font	Unknown	Resignation of Leandro Rubio Martínez
Granollers	25 March 1883	Antonio Ferratges de Mesa Ballester	Fusionist	Resignation of Antonio Ferratges de Mesa Ballester
Logroño	25 March 1883	Tirso Timoteo Rodrigáñez y Mateo Sagasta	Fusionist	Resignation of Tirso Timoteo Rodrigáñez y Mateo Sagasta
Mondoñedo	25 March 1883	Cándido Martínez Montenegro	Fusionist	Resignation of Cándido Martínez Montenegro
Pamplona	25 March 1883	Miguel Díez de Ulzurrun y López de Ceráin	Fusionist	Resignation of Gregorio Zabalza Olaso
Pamplona	25 March 1883	Wenceslao Martínez Aquerreta	Fusionist	Resignation Enrique Larrainzar y Ezcurra
Solsona	25 March 1883	Manuel de Azcárraga y Palmero	Fusionist	Resignation of Manuel de Azcárraga y Palmero
Valencia de Don Juan	25 March 1883	Demetrio Alonso Castrillo	Fusionist	Resignation of Demetrio Alonso Castrillo
Motril	1 April 1883	Francisco Moreu Sánchez	Fusionist	Nullification of the election of Gaspar Esteva Moreu
San Feliú de Llobregat	1 April 1883	José Ramoneda y Monés	Fusionist	Nullification of the election of Miguel Elías Marchal
Medina del Campo	8 April 1883	Francisco López Flores	Unknown	Choice of Valladolid by Germán Gamazo y Calvo
Sigüenza	15 April 1883	Antonio Botija Fajardo	Fusionist	Resignation of Rafael Ruiz Martínez
Cervera	22 April 1883	Vicente Alonso Martínez y Martín	Fusionist	Choice of Burgos by Manuel Alonso Martínez
Lorca	22 April 1883	Miguel Abellán y Pinar	Unknown	Nullification of the election of Juan Utor y Fernández
Tolosa	22 April 1883	Manuel de la Torre Ortiz y Gil	Conservative	Resignation of Joaquín Gorostegui y Garagarza
Betanzos	6 May 1883	Antonio Vázquez y López Amor	Fusionist	Nullification of the election of Antonio Vázquez y López Amor
Castelltersol	20 May 1883	Federico Pons y Montells	Fusionist	Nullification of the election of Antonio Rodó y Casanova
Estella	20 May 1883	José María Martínez de Ubago y Rodríguez	Conservative	Resignation of Fructuoso de Miguel Mauleón
Puenteareas	20 May 1883	Castor García Fernández	Unknown	Nullification of the election of Constantino Armesto y Cobián
San Clemente	20 May 1883	Joaquín Risueño Briz	Unknown	Choice of Becerreá by Manuel Becerra Bermúdez
Sequeros	20 May 1883	Fermín Hernández Iglesias	Conservative	Nullification of the election of José María Espinosa y Villapecellín
Medina-Sidonia	27 May 1883	Francisco Ruiz Martínez	Conservative	Incapacitation of Antonio Álvarez Jiménez
Cazalla de la Sierra	24 June 1883	Luis Calatrava y López Vadillo	Unknown	Death of Ignacio Sánchez Martínez
Montilla	18 July 1883	Manuel Mariategui y Vinyals	Conservative	Resignation of Antonio Aguilar y Correa
Villacarrillo	22 July 1883	Genaro de la Parra y Aguilar	Fusionist	Choice of Sorbas by Carlos Navarro y Rodrigo
Cádiz	26 August 1883	Alonso Álvarez de Toledo y Caro	Fusionist	Resignation of Eduardo Genovés y Puig
Cádiz	26 August 1883	Eduardo Garrido Estrada	Conservative	Death of José González de la Vega
Puentedeume	2 September 1883	Gaspar Rodríguez y Rodríguez	Fusionist	Resignation of Daniel Rodríguez y Rodríguez
Avilés	20 January 1884	Julián García San Miguel y Zaldúa	Progressive	Resignation of Julián García San Miguel y Zaldúa
Daimiel	20 January 1884	Emilio Nieto y Pérez	Progressive	Resignation of Emilio Nieto y Pérez
Ejea de los Caballeros	20 January 1884	Ángel Ramírez Carrera	Unknown	Resignation of Mariano Arredondo y Collar
Getafe	20 January 1884	Joaquín López Puigcerver	Progressive	Resignation of Joaquín López Puigcerver
Laredo	20 January 1884	Manuel de Eguilior y Llaguno	Fusionist	Resignation of Manuel de Eguilior y Llaguno
Soria	20 January 1884	José Canalejas y Méndez	Fusionist	Resignation of José Canalejas y Méndez
Villanueva y Geltrú	20 January 1884	Víctor Balaguer y Cirera	Dynastic Left	Resignation of Víctor Balaguer y Cirera
Albocácer	3 February 1884	Bernardo de Frau y Mesa	Fusionist	Resignation of Carlos Espinosa de los Monteros
Martos	3 February 1884	Joaquín Ruiz Jiménez	Fusionist	Resignation of Eduardo León y Llerena
Marchena	17 February 1884	Francisco Ruiz Martínez	Fusionist	Death of Francisco de Paula Candau y Acosta
Vitoria	17 February 1884	Sebastián Abreu y Cerain	Conservative	Death of Ramón Ortiz de Zárate Martínez de Galarreta
Mataró	24 February 1884	Juan Martínez Illescas y Moreno	Unknown	Incapacitation of José García Oliver

=== Senate ===
← Summary of the 2 September 1881 Senate of Spain election results →
Parties and alliances	Seats
Liberal Fusionist Party (Fusionistas)	135
Liberal Conservative Party (Conservadores)	15
Progressive–Possibilist Democrats (Demócratas)	12
Democratic Progressive Party (PPD)	8
Democratic Party (PD)	4
Independents (Independientes)	8
Archbishops (Arzobispos)	10
Total elective seats	180

Seats
Fusionist	75.00%
Conservative	8.33%
Democratic	6.67%
Independent	0.56%
Archbishops	5.56%

== Bibliography ==
Legislation

- Ley mandando que los distritos para las elecciones de Diputados a Cortes sean los que se expresan en la división adjunta (PDF) (Law). Madrid Gazette (in Spanish). 1 January 1871.
- Decreto mandando se verifiquen en Puerto Rico las elecciones ordinarias de Senadores y Diputados a Cortes (PDF) (Decree). Madrid Gazette (in Spanish). 1 April 1871.
- Constitución de la Monarquía Española (PDF) (Constitution). Madrid Gazette (in Spanish). 30 June 1876.
- Ley electoral de Senadores (PDF) (Law). Madrid Gazette (in Spanish). 8 February 1877.
- Ley electoral de los Diputados a Cortes (PDF) (Law). Madrid Gazette (in Spanish). 28 December 1878.
- Ley dictando reglas para la elección de Senadores en las islas de Cuba y Puerto Rico (PDF) (Law). Madrid Gazette (in Spanish). 9 January 1879.
- Decreto dividiendo la isla de Cuba en distritos electorales para la elección de Diputados a Cortes (Decree). Havana Gazette (in Spanish). University of Miami. 31 January 1879.
- Ley enumerando los empleos con los cuales es compatible el cargo de Diputado a Cortes (PDF) (Law). Madrid Gazette (in Spanish). 7 March 1880.
- Real decreto declarando disueltos el Congreso de los Diputados y la parte electiva del Senado (PDF) (Royal Decree). Madrid Gazette (in Spanish). 25 June 1881.
- Real decreto determinando el número de Senadores que habrán de elegirse en cada una de las provincias con motivo de las próximas elecciones (PDF) (Royal Decree). Madrid Gazette (in Spanish). 30 June 1881.

Other

- López Domínguez, José María (1976). Elecciones y partidos políticos de Puerto Rico: 1809-1898 (PDF) (Thesis) (in Spanish). Vol. 1. Puerto Rico: Complutense University of Madrid.
- Calero, Antonio María (1987). "La prerrogativa regia en la Restauración: teoría y práctica (1875-1902)" (PDF). Revista de Estudios Políticos (in Spanish) (55). Madrid: Centre for Political and Constitutional Studies: 273–315. ISSN 0048-7694.
- Ortega Álvarez, Luis; Santaolaya Machetti, Pablo (1996). "Evolución histórica del sistema electoral español". Revista de las Cortes Generales (in Spanish). 37. Cortes Generales: 65–107. doi:10.33426/rcg/1996/37/784. ISSN 0213-0130.
- Martorell Linares, Miguel Ángel (1997). "La crisis parlamentaria de 1913-1917. La quiebra del sistema de relaciones parlamentarias de la Restauración" (PDF). Revista de Estudios Políticos (in Spanish) (96). Madrid: Centre for Political and Constitutional Studies: 137–161. ISSN 0048-7694.
- Martínez Ruiz, Enrique; Maqueda Abreu, Consuelo; De Diego, Emilio (1999). Atlas histórico de España. El Reinado de Alfonso XII (1875-1885) (in Spanish). Vol. 2. Bilbao: Ediciones KAL. pp. 105–111. ISBN 9788470903502.
- Roldán de Montaud, Inés (1999). "Política y elecciones en Cuba durante la restauración". Revista de Estudios Políticos (in Spanish) (104): 245–287.
- García Muñoz, Montserrat (2002). "La documentación electoral y el fichero histórico de diputados". Revista General de Información y Documentación (in Spanish). 12 (1): 93–137. ISSN 1132-1873.
- Carreras de Odriozola, Albert; Tafunell Sambola, Xavier (2005) [1989]. Estadísticas históricas de España, siglos XIX-XX (PDF) (in Spanish). Vol. 1 (II ed.). Bilbao: Fundación BBVA. pp. 1072–1097. ISBN 84-96515-00-1. Archived from the original (PDF) on 24 September 2015.
- Martínez Relanzón, Alejandro (2017). "Political Modernization in Spain Between 1876 and 1923". Annales Universitatis Mariae Curie-Skłodowska, Sectio K. 24 (1). Madrid: Maria Curie-Skłodowska University: 145–154. doi:10.17951/k.2017.24.1.145.
