= Alejandro Ramírez =

Alejandro Ramírez may refer to:

- Alejandro Ramírez (economist) (1777–1821), Spanish economist
- Alejandro Ramírez (chess player) (born 1988), Costa Rican chess grandmaster
- Alejandro Ramírez (cyclist) (born 1981), Colombian cyclist
