= Democratic Progressive Party (Spain) =

Democratic Progressive Party Partido Progresista Demócrata
- Leader: Cristino Martos
- Founded: 1879
- Dissolved: 1882
- Merged into: Possibilist Democratic Party; Dynastic Left
- Ideology: Liberalism; Progressivism

The Democratic Progressive Party (Spanish: Partido Progresista Demócrata, PPD) was a Spanish political party created in 1879. It was joined by elements from the Republican Reformist Party, led by Cristino Martos, ahead of the 1879 Spanish general election.

In 1882 it dissolved and its members joined the Possibilist Democratic Party and the Dynastic Left.

== See also ==
- Liberalism and radicalism in Spain
