= José Posada Herrera =

Spanish jurist and politician

The Most Excellent José Posada Herrera
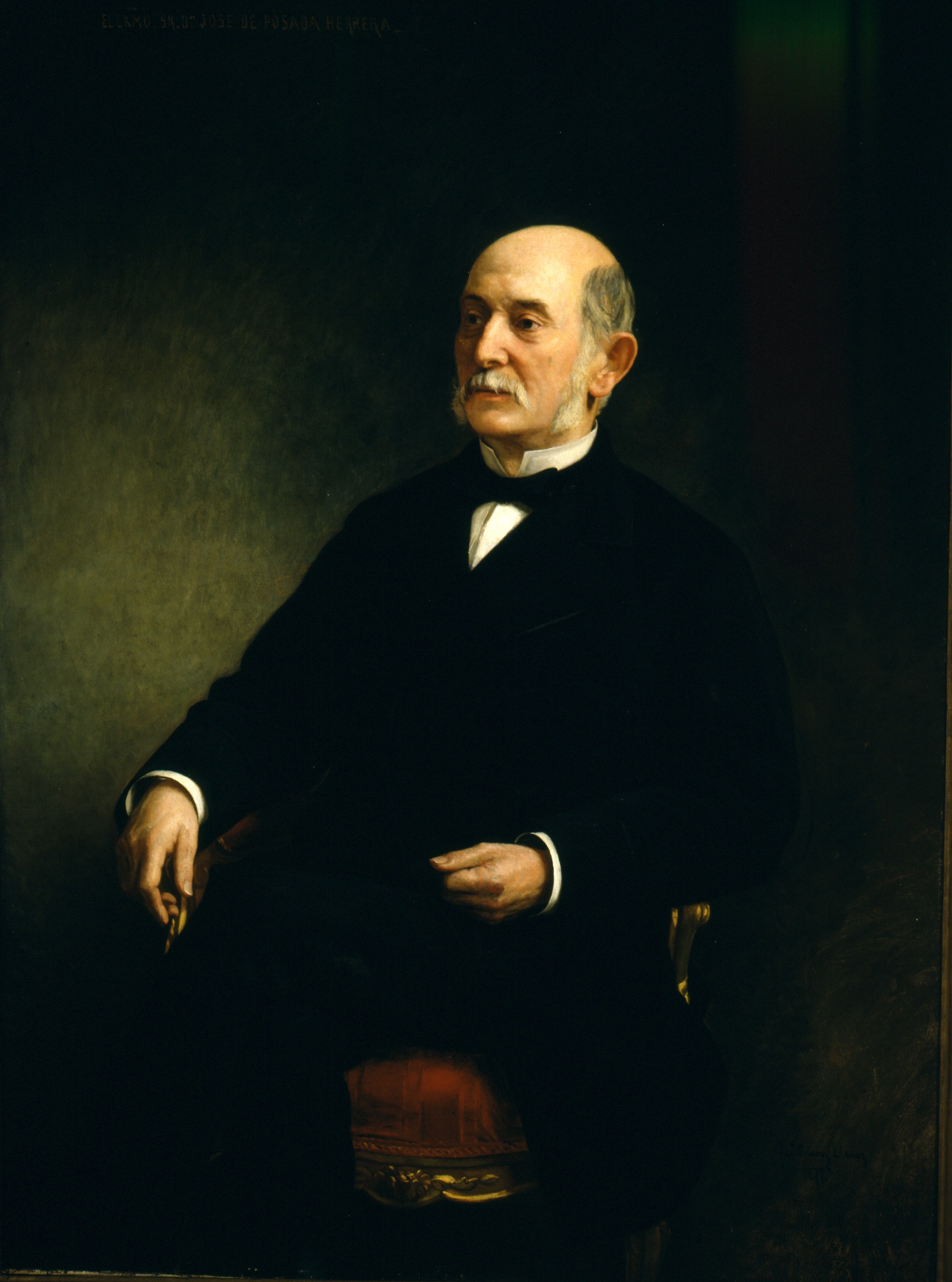
- Portrait by Ignacio Suárez Llanos

Prime Minister of Spain
- In office 13 October 1883 – 18 January 1884
- Monarch: Alfonso XII
- Preceded by: Praxedes Sagasta
- Succeeded by: Antonio Cánovas del Castillo

Personal details
- Born: José Posada y Herrera

José Posada Herrera (Llanes, Asturias, 31 March 1814 – 7 September 1885) was a Spanish jurist and politician, President of the Council of Ministers 1883–1884. He was a member of the Dynastic Left party. He was also a senator in his own right from 1884 to 1885, and a deputy during various times from 1839 to 1881.
