= Liberalism and radicalism in Spain =

This article gives an overview of liberalism and radicalism in Spain. It is limited to liberal and radical parties with substantial support, mainly proved by having been represented in parliament. The sign ⇒ denotes another party in that scheme. For inclusion in this scheme it is not necessary that parties label themselves as a liberal or radical party.

== Background ==
In the nineteenth century, liberalism was a major political force in Spain, but as in many other continental European countries care must be taken over the use of labels as this term was used with different meanings.

As in much of Europe, the nineteenth-century history of Spain would largely revolve around the conflicts between the three major liberal currents – radicalism; progressive classical liberalism, or conservative classical liberalism. While all three rejected the Catholic, traditionalist, and absolutist Old Regime, each had a different perspective on the urgency and degree to which state and society needed reforming to modernize the values and institutions.

- The term 'liberal' itself was usually used to signify classical liberalism. It had a progressive-liberal wing as represented by the Fusionist Liberal Party (more inclined towards gradual reform, and making compromises with the radical current); and a conservative-liberal wing as represented by the Liberal Conservative Party (more inclined towards traditionalism, and compromising with the absolute-monarchist faction). Its various currents were broadly united by a set of shared beliefs:
  1. In political affairs, parliamentarianism, though of a socially-conservative kind (e.g., suffrage limited to property-owners);
  2. In economic affairs, free-market capitalism;
  3. In social affairs, conservatism (e.g.: rejecting full universal suffrage; or a strictly laic separation of church and state)
  4. In constitutional affairs, flexible towards the type of constitutional regime (monarchy or republic).
- For the left-liberal and social-liberal currents, 'liberal' was rarely used as the single defining label. Instead such currents rather used labels such as radical, democratic or republican (see republicanism). The shared beliefs that generally unified its various factions included:
  1. Universal manhood suffrage;
  2. Sovereignty to be vested in the people of the nation rather than in the royal parliament;
  3. A root-and-branch reform to remove the political influence of monarchical, religious and aristocratic patronage;
  4. A certain degree of social democracy, as the nineteenth century progressed;
  5. An active role for an administratively-centralized state in carrying out these tasks.

== History ==
Each of the following sections describes an element of Spanish liberalism and radicalism, mostly beginning with the 19th century.

=== From Liberals to Liberal Fusionist Party ===
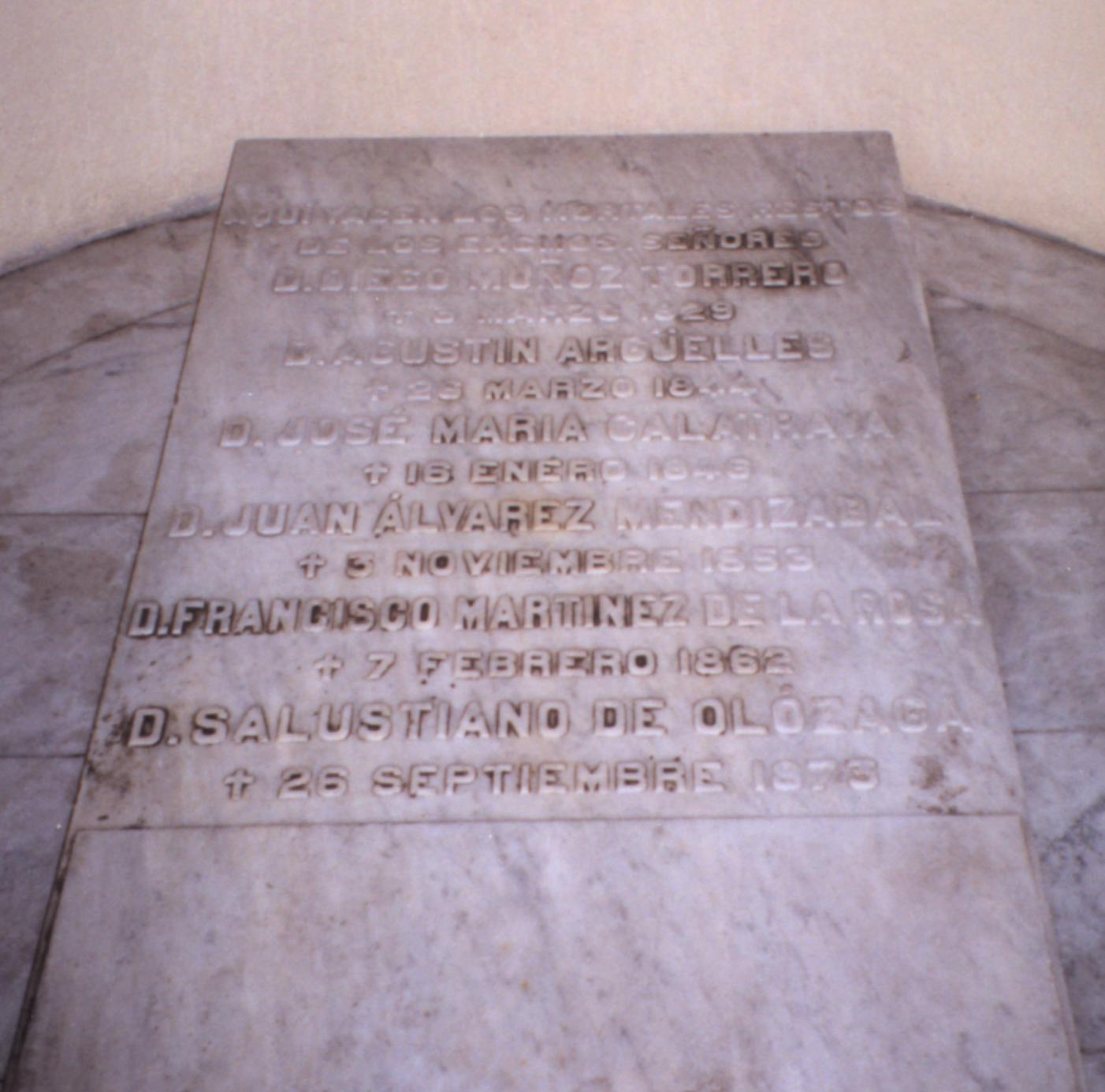
A common grave for six Liberal politicians from the 19th century at the Panteón de Hombres Ilustres, Madrid.

- 1808–12: Until 1839 the Spanish liberals were not organized in a well-established party, but formed their own factions. During the War of Independence and the Constitution of Cádiz the term Liberals (Liberales, 1812–1820) was used to describe the diverse range of currents influenced by the Enlightenment and French Revolution and united in rejecting the absolutism of the Bourbon monarchy.
- 1820–39: Between 1820 and 1839 the Liberals split into two factions. The 'Radicals' (Exaltados), known as Veinteanistas (Supporters of 1820) were inspired by French Jacobinism and Radicalism and wished to draft a new more progressive constitution based on universal suffrage; the 'Moderates' (Moderados), closer to classical liberalism, were known as Doceanistas (Supporters of 1812) as they wished simply to restore the more limited constitution of 1812.
- 1839–1879: Finally in 1839 most of the Radicals and Moderates organized themselves into a loose parliamentary group known as the Progressives (Progresistas, 1839–1880), led by people like Baldomero Espartero, Salustiano Olózoga, Juan Prim, Práxedes Sagasta and Francisco Serrano y Domínguez, Duke de la Torre. Out of this current various factions splintered off to form successor parties: the
  - in 1843, the ⇒Democratic Party
  - in 1854 the ⇒Liberal Union;
  - in 1869 the Democratic Radical Party;
  - in 1879 the ⇒ Democratic Progressive Party.
- 1880: The majority of Liberal currents united in the Fusionist (i.e. merged) Liberal Party (Partido Liberal Fusionista), led by Sagasta, though some more Radical factions remain outside the party
- 1882: A left-wing faction of the party established the ⇒ Dynastic Left, most of its members returned between 1884 and 1886 to the Liberal Fusionist Party
- 1890: The ⇒ Possibilist Democratic Party joined the party
- 1907: A left-wing faction of the party seceded as the ⇒ Monarchist Democratic Party
- 1918: A faction seceded as the ⇒ Liberal Left
- 1923: The party disappeared due to the Miguel Primo de Rivera coup

=== Democratic Party ===
- 1843: The left wing of the ⇒ Progressives established the Democratic Party (Partido Demócrata) as a rally of left-wing liberals and moderate socialists
- 1868: The republican wing formed the ⇒ Federal Republican Party
- 1871: The party disappeared and remnants of the party continue as a monarchist party

=== Liberal Union ===
- 1854: Moderate ⇒ progressives established the Liberal Union (Unión Liberal), led by Leopoldo O'Donnell
- 1868: The party merged with the conservative Moderates into the Liberal Conservative Party

=== Federal Republican Party ===
- 1868: The republican wing of the ⇒ Democratic Party established the Federal Democratic Republican Party (Partido Republicano Democrático Federal), also known as the Republican-Democratic Party
- 1878: A faction joined the ⇒ Reformist Republican Party
- 1879: A faction seceded as the ⇒ Possibilist Democratic Party
- 1891: The party absorbs a faction of the ⇒ Democratic Radical Party
- 1923: The party disappeared due to the Primo de Rivera coup

=== From Democratic Radical Party to Centralist Party ===
- 1869: A left-wing faction of the Progressives seceded as the Democratic Radical Party (Partido Radical Demócrata), led by Ruiz Zorilla
- 1876: The party is reorganised into the Reformist Republican Party, led by Nicolás Salmerón
- 1878: A faction of the ⇒ Federal Republican Party joined the party
- 1879: A faction joined the ⇒ Democratic Progressive Party
- 1890: The party is renamed Centralist Party (Partido Centralista)
- 1891: The party is absorbed by the ⇒ Federal Republican Party

=== Possibilist Democratic Party ===
- 1879: A faction of the ⇒ Federal Republican Party formed the Possibilist Democratic Party ('Partido Posibilista'), led by Emilio Castelar
- 1890: The party joins the ⇒ Liberal Fusionist Party

=== Democratic Progressive Party ===
- 1879: A left wing faction of the ⇒ Progressives with dissidents of the Reformist Republican Party formed the Democratic Progressive Party (Partido Progresista Democrático)
- 1882: The party merges into the ⇒ Dynastic Left

=== Dynastic Left ===
- 1882: A faction of the ⇒ Liberal Fusionist Party together with the Democratic Progressive Party established the Dynastic Left (Izquierda Dinástica), led by Francisco Serrano and Adolfo Posada
- 1886: Between 1884 and 1886 most of the members returned to the ⇒ Liberal Fusionist Party

=== Liberal Democratic Party ===
- 1913: A faction of the ⇒ Fusionist Liberal Party seceded and formed the Liberal Democratic Party, led by Manuel García Prieto
- 1923: The party disappeared

=== Republican Union (1906) ===
- 1906: A faction of the ⇒ Federal Republican Union seceded as the Republican Union (Unión Republicana), led by Nicolás Salmerón
- 1908: A faction seceded as the ⇒ Radical Republican Party
- 1923: The party disappeared due to the Primo de Rivera coup

=== Monarchist Democratic Party ===
- 1907: A left-wing faction of the ⇒ Liberal Fusionist Party seceded as the Monarchist Democratic Party (Partido Democrático Monnárquico) of José Canalejas
- 1923: The party disappeared due to the Primo de Rivera coup

=== Radical Republican Party ===
- 1908: A faction of the ⇒ Republican Union established the Radical Republican Party (Partido Republicano Radical), led by Alejandro Lerroux
- 1929: A left-wing faction established the ⇒ Radical Socialist Republican Party
- 1933: Due to the development into a conservative party, the liberal wing seceded as the ⇒ Radical Democratic Party. The original party disappeared in 1939

=== Liberal Left ===
- 1918: A faction of the ⇒ Fusionist Liberal Party seceded to form the Liberal Left (Izquierda Liberal)
- 1923: The party disappeared due to the Primo de Rivera coup

=== From Republican Action to Republican Left ===
- 1926: Manuel Azaña established the Republican Action (Acción Republicana), as a cross-party thinktank which initially worked closely alongside the Radical Republican party.
- 1931: Republican Action was converted into a political party.
- 1934: The party merged with a politically similar Galician regional party and the left-wing faction of the ⇒ Radical Socialist Republican Party into the Republican Left (Izquierda Republicana)
- 1939: The party is banned, though there were later attempts to revive the party after 1976

=== Radical Socialist Republican Party ===
- 1929: A left-wing faction of the ⇒ Radical Republican Party established the Radical Socialist Republican Party (Partido Republicano Radical Socialista)
- 1934: The party is dissolved, members joined the ⇒ Republican Left or the ⇒ Republican Union

=== From Democratic Radical Party to Republican Union ===
- 1933: Due to the development of the ⇒ Radical Republican Party, the liberal wing seceded as the Democratic Radical Party (Partido Radical Demócrata)
- 1934: The party merged with a faction of the ⇒ Radical Socialist Republican Party into the Republican Union (Unión Republicana)
- 1939: The party is banned

=== Democratic Convergence of Catalonia ===
- 1974: Democrats in Catalonia established the Democratic Convergence of Catalonia, a democratic nationalist party with liberal values, led by Jordi Pujol.

=== Democratic and Social Centre ===
- 1982: Former prime minister Adolfo Suárez left the Union of the Democratic Centre and established the liberal Democratic and Social Centre (Centro Democrático y Social). The party lost parliamentary representation in 1993, but continued to exist until 2006.

=== Citizens ===
- 2005: Citizens (Ciudadanos) was founded.

=== Union, Progress and Democracy ===
- 2007: The leader of Union, Progress and Democracy (Unión, Progreso y Democracia) became the former member of the Spanish Socialist Workers' Party Rosa Díez. She created it with the philosophers Fernando Savater and Carlos Martínez Gorriarán.

== Liberal leaders ==
- Liberals before 1912: Emilio Castelar y Ripoll – José Canalejas y Mendez
- Izquierda Republicana: Manuel Azaña
- Centro Democrático y Social: Adolfo Suárez
- Ciudadanos: Albert Rivera

== Liberal thinkers ==
In the Contributions to liberal theory the following Spanish thinkers are included:

- José Ortega y Gasset (Spain, 1883–1955)
- Salvador de Madariaga (Spain, 1886–1978)

== See also ==
- Liberalism by country
- List of political parties in Spain
- Spanish nationalism
- History of Spain
- Politics of Spain
- Trienio Liberal
- Spanish Constitution of 1812
