= Sor Patrocinio =

Spanish nun

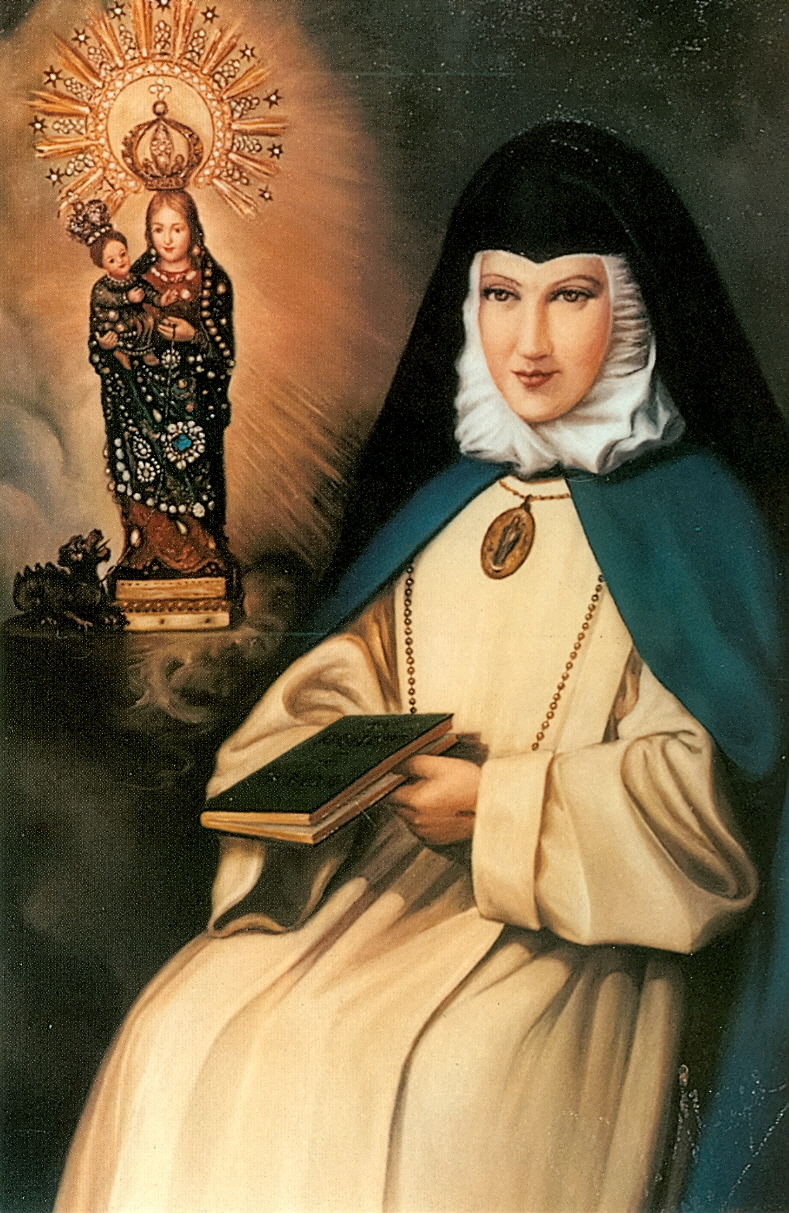
Portrait of Sor Patrocinio (ca. 1890)

María Rafaela de los Dolores y del Patrocinio, more commonly known as Sor Patrocinio ("Sister Protection", of Mary), also known as "the nun of the wounds" (San Clemente, Cuenca, 1811 – Guadalajara, 1891), was a Spanish nun of the Order of the Immaculate Conception. She was prominent in the Spanish social and political spheres in the second half of the 19th century through her influence over Queen Isabel II and the queen's husband, King Francisco de Asís de Borbón.

Patrocinio's reported mystical experiences and supernatural phenomena have been a source of controversy, at the time and later. She was instrumental in the founding or reform of many monasteries of the Order in both Spain and France. The cause for her beatification is currently being studied by the Holy See.

== Early life ==
Patrocinio was born María Josefa de los Dolores Anastasia de Quiroga y Capopardo on 27 April 1811 in San Clemente de la Mancha, in the province of Cuenca, on a farm called Venta del Pinar. Her parents, Diego de Quiroga y Valcárcel and Dolores Capopardo y del Castillo, were members of the royal court in Madrid, who were fleeing the city due to the upheavals of the Spanish War of Independence then taking place, when her mother was overtaken by birth pangs and had to take shelter at the farm.

On the death of Quiroga's father, her impoverished family returned to Madrid. Her mother intended her to marry Salustiano Olózaga, then a young lawyer; but this plan was rejected by Patrocinio herself. The two would later meet again during her trial in 1835, and during her exile in France following the revolutionary events of 1868.

In 1826 Quiroga was sent to the monastery of the nuns of the Order of Santiago in Madrid, under the guidance of her aunt, the Marquesa of Santa Coloma for her education. On 19 January 1829, under the patronage of the Duchess of Benavente, she was admitted as a novice in the Conceptionist Monastery of Caballero de Gracia and received her religious name. That same year, while still a novice, she sustained a wound in the left side, which she understood to be a stigma. On 20 January 1830, she professed religious vows in the Order.

== Further mystical experiences ==
Starting early in 1830, Patrocinio reported mystical visions, many of them with bodily symptoms. On 20 May - Ascension Day - wounds appeared in her hands and feet, resembling those inflicted by the crown of thorns. On 8 June, two days after Corpus Christi day, she fell into an ecstatic state and reported that the voice of Christ spoke to her from a wall hanging. Her wounds were characterised by the large amount of blood that issued from them. Her reputation spread and cloths stained with the blood of her wounds were in request as curative amulets.

When the death of King Fernando VII in 1833 was followed by the Carlist war, "the clericals, who favoured Don Carlos, saw in her a useful instrument. She was made to prophesy the success of the Pretender (Don Carlos) and to furnish proof of the illegitimacy of the young Queen Isabel".

In November 1835 Patrocinio was put on trial accused of imposture and of supporting the Carlist cause. The trial sought to establish the true origin of the wounds she then bore. Three medical experts, after examining the wounds, undertook to heal them. A later examination certified that the wounds were now completely scarred over. Under oath, the nun stated that during her novitiate the Capuchin friar, Fermín Sánchez y Artesoro, (Note: Lea gives the friar's name as Fermin Alcaraz) had supplied her with "a relic which, when applied to any part of the body, would cause a wound which would then have to kept open as the source of suffering and mortification as offerings to God as penitence for sins... showing no-one their cause, and if questioned she had to say that they had come to her supernaturally". The nun's reputation had attracted alms and donations intended for the Order and its monasteries; this now appeared as motive for fraud. The Capuchin friar had left the kingdom and could not be found to give evidence, and the court regarded this as confirming his guilt. For his part, the advocate for the defense, Juan M. González y Acevedo, argued that the evidence presented "was all lies, except the torment" of his client, whose role was that of "a victim, the more worthy of compassion in that she appeared condemned to a slow and painful death".

After the trial, Patrocinio was expelled from her monastery and kept in a private house, before being taken to the House of Penitents of St. Mary Magdalene. She was then sentenced to banishment from the vicinity of the Court. She spent two years in a monastery in Talavera de la Reina. There she started writing the text known as the Golden Book, originally called The Month of the Eternal Mary.

Patrocinio's exile in Talavera began to affect her health. After petitioning the queen several times by letter, she was allowed to move to the monastery of her Order at Torrelaguna, near Madrid, where she lived for the next five years.

== Return to Madrid ==
Once the regency of Queen María Cristina had terminated and Isabel II had become queen in her own right, Patrocinio was permitted to return to Madrid. She entered the monastery of La Latina, which belonged to her Order. In 1845 she moved to the Monastery of Jesús Nazareno, where she had charge of the novices. Her influence over the monarchs was increasing. "... [S]he became the power behind the throne. Dr Argumosa, who had cured her stigmata, was persecuted and Alcaraz (sic), who had emerged from his hiding place, was made Bishop of Cuenca. In 1849 she was held to have forced Isabel to dismiss the Duke of Valencia (Narvaez) and his cabinet". Also in 1849 she was shot at, but not harmed. Soon after this she was chosen as abbess, a position that from then on she held at each of the monasteries to which she moved. Her moves against General Narváez led to her banishment to Badajoz, although Narváez soon pardoned her and permitted her return.

In regard to the relationship between Patrocinio and Isabel II, the queen's daughter Princess Eulalia wrote: "I often heard my mother talking about how Father Claret, her confessor and someone with a great deal of influence over her, and the nun Sor Patrocinio (...) had suggested an approach to Pope Pius IX asking for the new dogma to be promulgated. My mother, a very religious woman (...) arranged that other leading Catholics would also sign this and would act in other ways within the Papacy". The dogma she mentions is that of the Immaculate Conception of Mary, which was promulgated on 8 December 1854. Thus Patrocinio, through her social relations at the highest level, had come to exert a theological influence.

== Further moves and foundations ==
To distance her from Madrid and from her perceived influence over the monarchs, in 1852 she was sent to Rome, where her claim to holiness would be examined. However, she became ill during the journey and did not reach Italy. The government then ordered her to move to the Monastery of Poor Clares in Toledo. Later she founded the first school for small girls from poor families, at the Monastery of Montserrat, in Madrid. Then Generals Narváez and Espartero came to power and sent her away to the Poor Clare Monastery of St. Catherine the Martyr in Baeza. The Archbishop of Toledo ordered her to move to a derelict monastery at Torrelavega to re-found it. Having accomplished this mission she embarked on the foundation of new monasteries, of which the first was at Aranjuez. Here she was again the target of an unsuccessful armed attack. Other monasteries followed, at La Granja de San Ildefonso, at San Lorenzo del Escorial and at Guadalajara. During this period it is claimed that she prophesied the martyrdom of the Franciscan friar, Nicanor Ascanio.

== Final banishment, return and death ==
"Under her guidance, during the remainder of the reign of Isabel II, the camarilla practically ruled the kingdom and precipitated the revolution of 1868" which brought about the temporary fall of the Spanish monarchy. Cardinal Ciliria sent her to France so that she would not fall into the hands of the revolutionaries. There the nun continued her mission of foundation. She drew up the rule of a new Order for approval by the Bishop of Paris. When the monarchy was restored in 1874, Alfonso XII came to the throne and permitted her return to Spain. She continued with the work of foundation up to the last year of her life. She died in the convent of Carmen de Guadalajara in 1891.

The process of beatification began in 1907. Her spiritual writings were approved by theologians on 18 June 1930; she was later declared a Servant of God. As of 2013 there was still a movement to have her made a saint.

== Works ==
- Golden Book (Sp. Libro de Oro o Mes de María), Madrid 1860
- Letters of Sor Patrocinio in J. Ortega Rubio, Historia de España, VI, Madrid 1908-1910, pp. 386–437
- Novena prayer to Christ of the Word (Sp. Novena al Cristo de la Palabra)
- Novena prayer to Our Lady of Forgetting, Triumph and Mercies (Sp. Novena a Ntra. Sra. del Olvido, Triunfo y Misericordias)

== See also ==
- Diego de Argumosa in Spanish Wikipedia

== Bibliography ==
- Gomis, J.B. (1946), Sor Patrocinio. La Monja de las Llagas. Aspas, Madrid.
- Jarnés, Benjamín (1972), Sor Patrocinio: la monja de las llagas, Espasa-Calpe, Madrid.
- Gonzalez, Arturo (1981), Sor Patrocinio. Editora Nacional, Madrid (ISBN 8427605226).
- Voltes Bou, Pedro (1994), Sor Patrocinio: la monja prodigiosa. Planeta, Barcelona (ISBN 8408011405).
