= La Vecilla =

Coordinates: 42°51′N 5°24′W

La Vecilla, Spain
- municipality
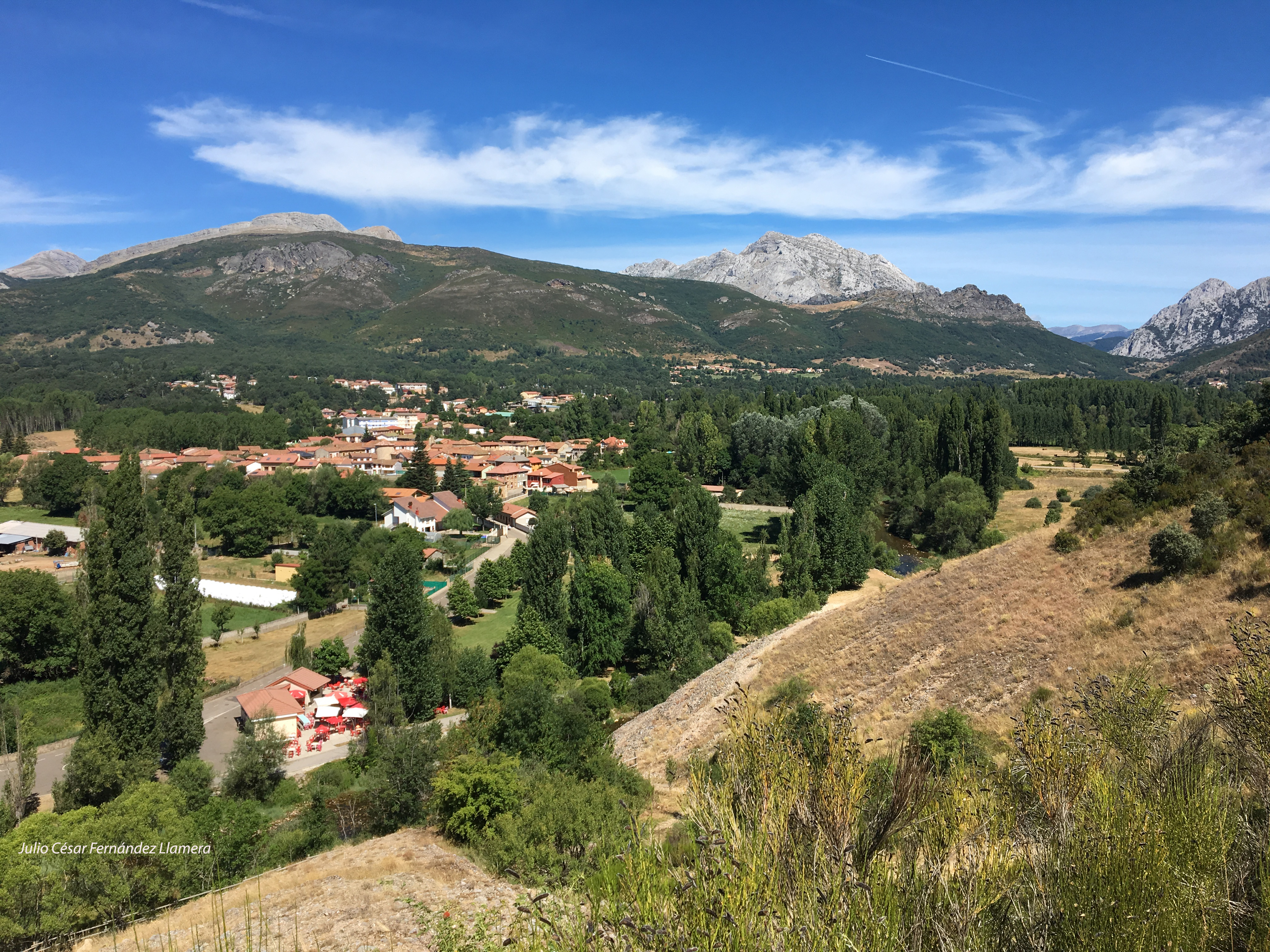

- Flag Coat of arms
- Interactive map of La Vecilla, Spain
- Country: Spain
- Autonomous community: Castile and León
- Province: León
- Municipality: La Vecilla

Area
  - Total: 44 km^{2} (17 sq mi)

Population (2025-01-01)
  - Total: 383
  - Density: 8.7/km^{2} (23/sq mi)
- Time zone: UTC+1 (CET)
  - Summer (DST): UTC+2 (CEST)

La Vecilla is a municipality located in the province of León, Castile and León, Spain. According to the 2004 census (INE), the municipality has a population of 421 inhabitants.
