= A Caniza =

- Municipality
- Concello da Caniza
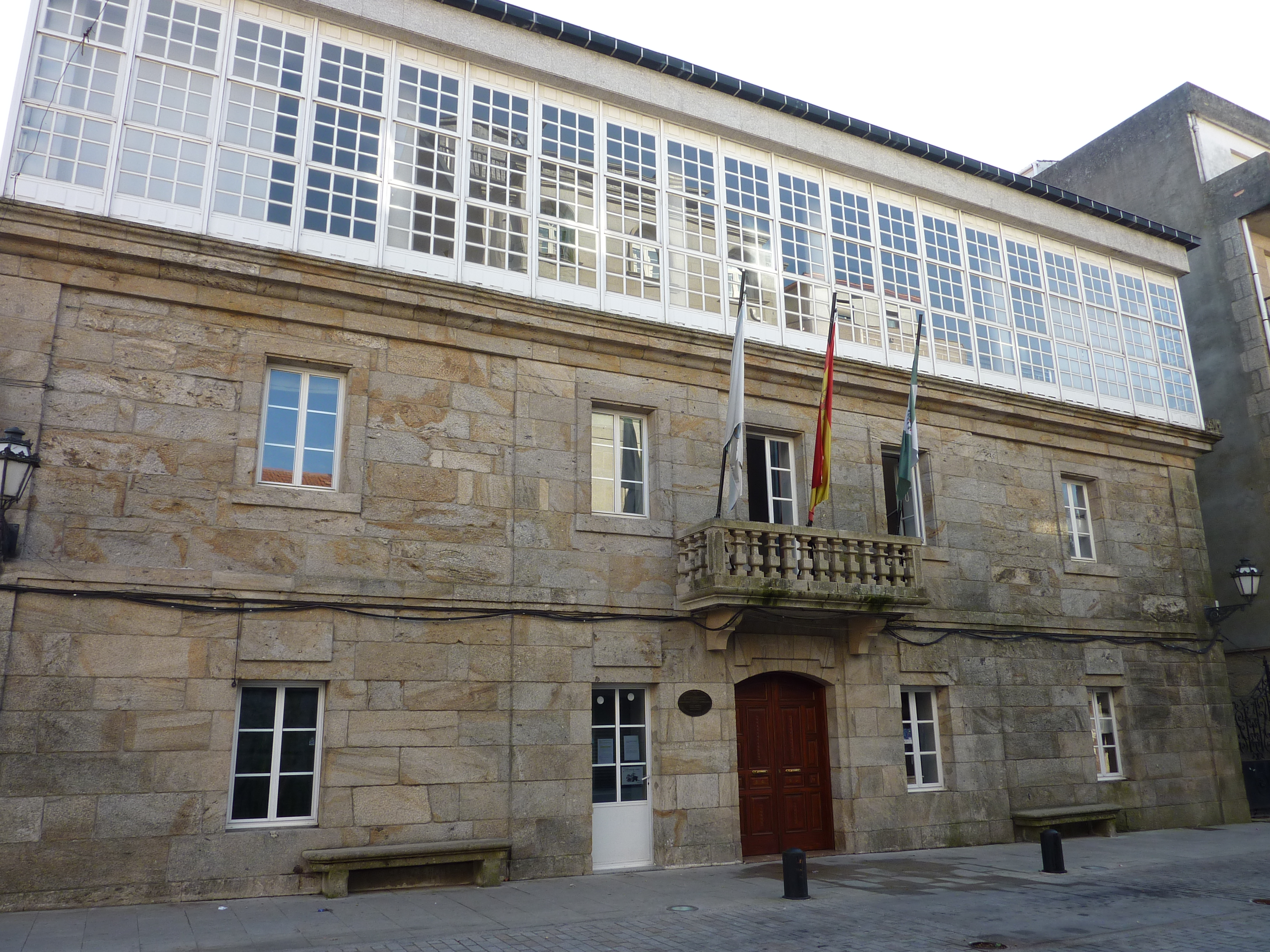

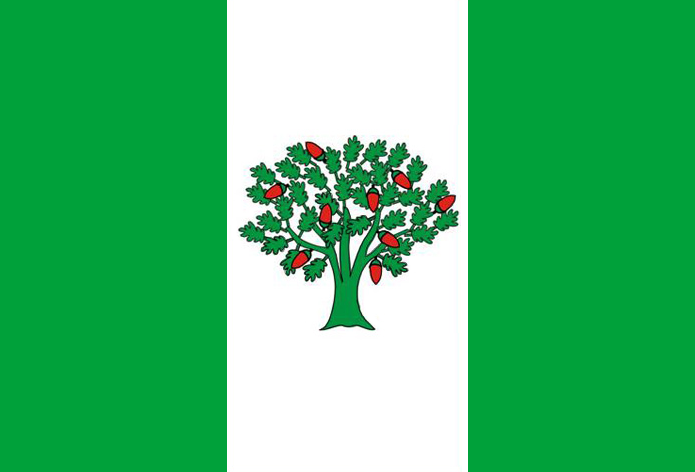
- Flag Coat of arms

- Location within Province of Pontevedra Location within Galicia Location within Spain
- Coordinates: 42°12′46″N 8°16′28″W
- Country: Spain
- Autonomous community: Galicia
- Province: Pontevedra
- Comarca: A Paradanta

Government
  - Alcalde (Mayor): Luis Piña

Area
  - Total: 108.1 km^{2} (41.7 sq mi)

Population (2025-01-01)
  - Total: 4,990
  - Density: 46.2/km^{2} (120/sq mi)
- (INE)
- Time zone: UTC+1 (CET)
  - Summer (DST): UTC+2 (CEST)

A Caniza is a municipality in Galicia, Spain, in the province of Pontevedra. It is part of the comarca of A Paradanta. It has an area of 108.1 km^{2} and had a population of just under 5,200 in 2018, spread across nine parishes.

The town is mainly known as a tourist destination, and its industrial and business sectors have grown steadily in recent years.

Local food, especially cured meats and above all ham, plays a central role in many events. Examples include the long-standing pilgrimage to A Franqueira, which the Galician regional government has declared a Festival of Tourist Interest, and the Ham Fair.

The municipality's mountainous inland location gives it a varied landscape of mountains and valleys, and events are held there throughout the year.

== History ==
Although A Caniza is the newest of the municipality's nine parishes, it is now the most important in administrative terms. It is the seat of the municipal government and of most administrative services, and it has the largest population despite being the smallest parish by area. Its history goes back to the late 18th century.

The first inhabitants of the parish came from nearby areas, especially Valeixe. They began settling the area now known as A Calzada so that they could live closer to the land they farmed. Others followed, building houses near their properties and fields, and these were later replaced by better buildings. The parish's name, Canizas, reflects this origin: the first shelters were huts made of woven tree branches and covered with straw, which local people called canizas or hurdles, and which gave farmers shelter from the rain. These structures were also known at the time as granaries.

The construction of the Royal Road linking the cities of Tui and Vigo with Castile later gave the parish its decisive boost. The route was chosen largely because of the good ground conditions; Valeixe was passed over because its more difficult terrain complicated the design of the roadway. Many buildings were put up along the road, which became known as Main Street. There was also a coaching inn with a horse trough at the place now known as the Fountain of the Two Pipes.

Originally, A Caniza belonged to the parish of Santa Cristina de Valeixe, and not to a municipality of Valeixe, as is still often assumed. On 9 July 1790, at the repeated request of local residents, the Bishop of Tui, Domingo Fernández Angulo, made the "Canizas" neighbourhood an annex of Santa Cristina. One of the residents' main reasons was the distance they had to travel to the parish church in Valeixe, 9 kilometres away along a poor, rocky road. Shortly afterwards, a chapel dedicated to the Holy Name of Jesus and Saint Teresa was built on the site now occupied by the town's Plaza Mayor. The first baptism took place on 28 July 1790 and the first marriage on 5 September of the same year, but funerals continued to be held in Valeixe until the parish became fully independent.

As the population kept growing, residents sought full separation from the mother parish and petitioned the church authorities in Tui. After a contested case, they won a narrow judgment on 25 February 1815. Because of the major political upheavals in Spain at the time, A Caniza was served by several temporary priests and did not receive its first permanent parish priest, Benito María Sarmiento, until April or May 1844.

A Caniza reached its peak in the late 18th and early 19th centuries. Its population grew rapidly, the court of the jurisdiction of Achas moved there, and it became the head of the jurisdiction and of the district, receiving the title of villa (town). In 1815 the town was governed by an ordinary judge. It did not become a municipality with its own mayor until 1820; until then it was governed by a judge.

=== Prehistory ===
One of the oldest sites in the municipality is the citania (fortified settlement) at Bouzas Chan. The remains of its circular dwellings, known as casarellas, can still be seen. The same area also contains a dolmen with a domed capstone and cave petroglyphs that have not yet been deciphered.

=== Antiquity ===
The earliest known written reference to the area dates from 138 BC, when Livy describes the campaign of Decimus Junius Brutus in these lands.

=== Modern age ===
During the Peninsular War, the people of A Caniza were noted for their resistance to the French troops.

== See also ==
- List of municipalities in Pontevedra
