= Octavio Cuartero Cifuentes =

Spanish writer, judge and politician

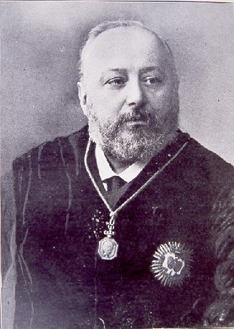
Octavio Cuartero Cifuentes

Octavio Cuartero Cifuentes (February 14, 1855 - February 21, 1913) was a Spanish writer, judge and politician.
