= Sociedad Económica de Amigos del País en Puerto Rico =

Learned society in Spanish colonial San Juan, Puerto Rico

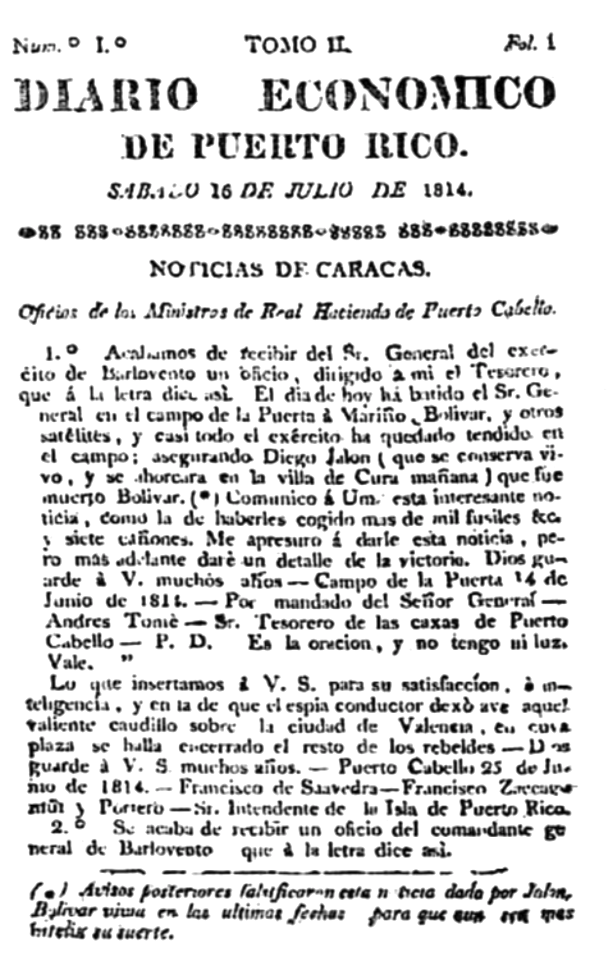
Issue of Diario Economico de Puerto Rico newspaper, 1814

The Sociedad Económica de Amigos del País en Puerto Rico (1813–1899) was a learned society in the Spanish colony San Juan, Puerto Rico, modelled after the Sociedad Económica de los Amigos del País in Spain. The society published a newspaper, the short-lived Diario Económico de Puerto Rico (1814–1815), and organized a library in 1843. Members included Alejandro Ramírez (a founder) and Manuel Gregorio Tavárez.

== Bibliography ==
- María Teresa Cortés Zavala (2016). "La Sociedad Económica de Amigos del País en Puerto Rico y las practicas de la lectura en el primer Gabinete de Lectura". Revista Brasileira do Caribe (in Portuguese). 17. ISSN 1518-6784 – via Redalyc.org.
