= Alejandro Ramírez (economist) =

Spanish economist

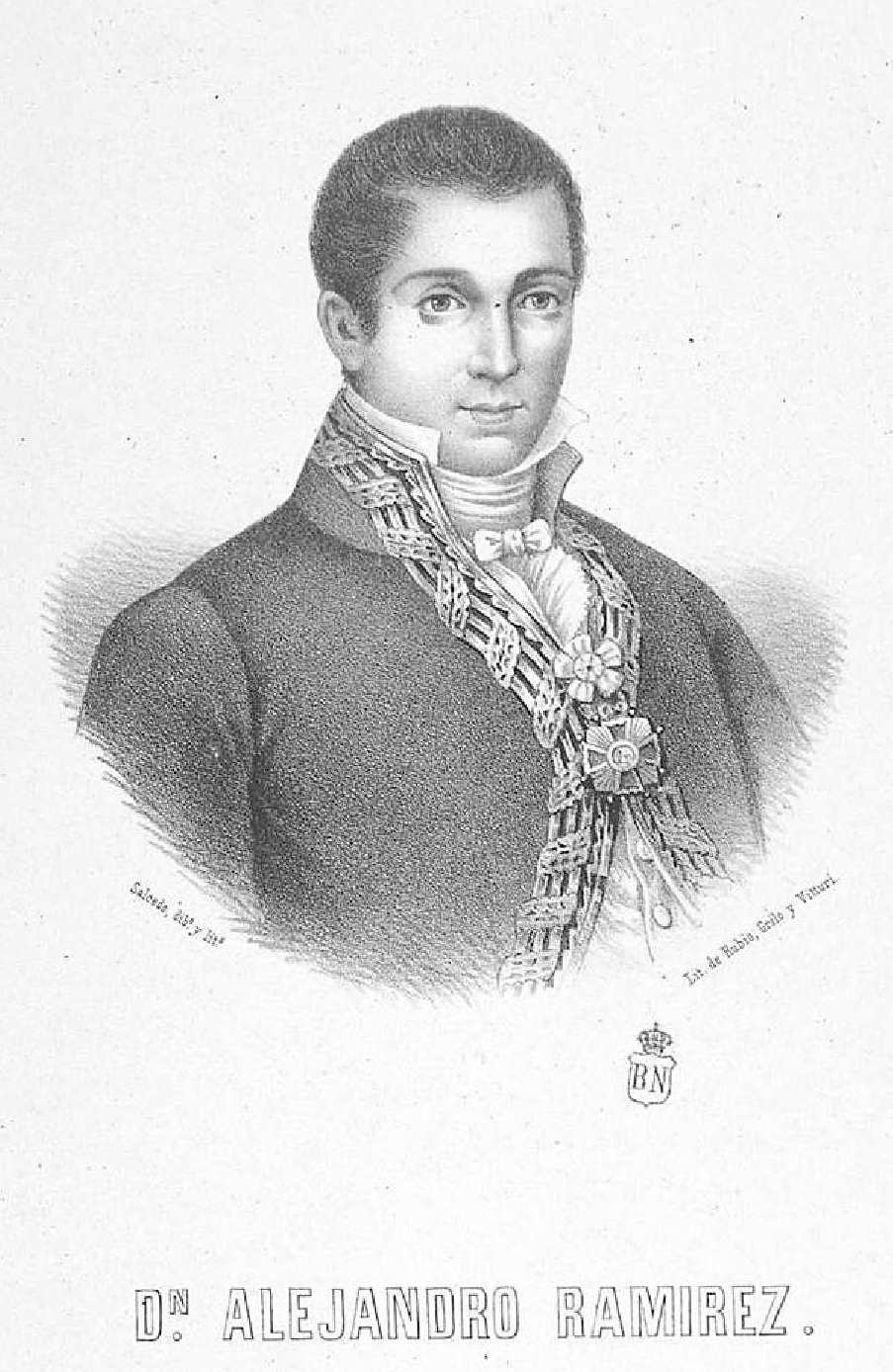
Alejandro Ramirez (1777 – 1821)

Alejandro Ramírez y Blanco (February 25, 1777 – May 20, 1821) was a Spanish economist.

Born in Alaejos, Ramírez studied Economy at the University of Alcalá, then immigrated to Guatemala in 1795. In 1802, he served as secretary to Guatemala's Captain general, Antonio González Mollinedo y Saravia. On December 12, 1812, Ramírez was sworn in as Intendant of Puerto Rico. While in Puertio Rico, he established a series of financial reforms that significantly improved government efficiency, helped reduce government expenses and established a fairer income tax, allowing the island's municipalities major control of their finances and increasing Puerto Rico's treasury more than three-hundred percent during only his first year in office.

In 1815, he was named Supervisor of the Finances of the Spanish Crown in Cuba, then Superintendent of Cuba and Intendant of Havana on July 3, 1816. During his tenure in Cuba, he vouched for the abolition of the monopoly on tobacco. He also promoted a Royal Decree in 1818 establishing Cuba's right to commerce freely with other countries. In 1818, Ramírez supported the foundation of the Escuela Gratuita de Dibujo y Pintura in Havana, which was then given the name of San Alejandro on behalf of him. He became the first Latin-American to become a member of the American Philosophical Society.

== Legacy ==
The building of the Departamento de Hacienda in Puerto Rico has the name of Alejandro Ramírez. It was built in 1969 and has a statue of Ramírez in front. The statue is the work of artist Rafael López del Campo. In Ponce's Barrio Sexto (a.k.a. Barrio Cantera), there is a street, "Calle Intendente Ramírez", named after him.
