= San Clemente, Cuenca =

San Clemente
- Municipality
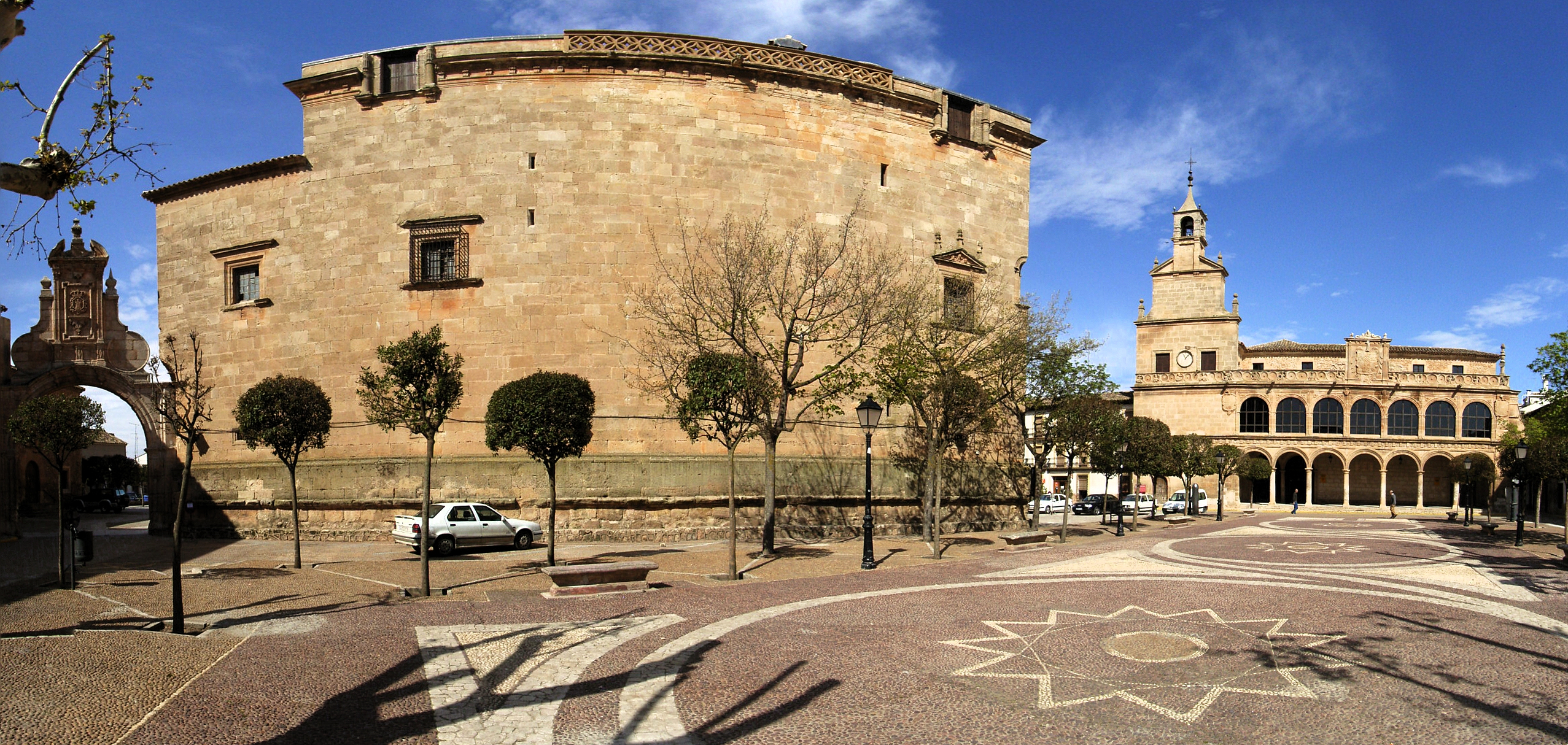
- Main Square of San Clemente

- Flag Coat of arms

- Location within Spain Location within Castilla-La Mancha
- Coordinates: 39°24′14″N 2°25′46″W
- Country: Spain
- Autonomous community: Castile-La Mancha
- Province: Cuenca

Population (2025-01-01)
  - Total: 6,797
- Time zone: UTC+1 (CET)
  - Summer (DST): UTC+2 (CEST)

San Clemente is a municipality in Cuenca, Castile-La Mancha, Spain. The municipality covers an area of 277.51 square kilometres (107.15 sq mi) and as of 2011 had a population of 7367 people.
