= Dynastic Left =

Dynastic Left Izquierda Dinástica
- Leader: José López Domínguez
- Founded: 1881
- Dissolved: 1884
- Split from: Liberal Fusionist Party
- Merged into: Liberal Party
- Ideology: Liberalism; Monarchism; Progressivism

The Dynastic Left (Spanish: Izquierda Dinástica, ID) was a Spanish political party founded in 1881 by elements from the Liberal Fusionist Party and the Democratic Progressive Party.

Between 1884 and 1886 most of its members returned to the Liberal Fusionist Party, now rebranded as simply the Liberal Party.

== See also ==
- Liberalism and radicalism in Spain

== Bibliography ==
- Artola Gallego, Miguel (1974). Partidos y programas políticos (1808 - 1936) (in Spanish). Vol. 1. Madrid: Editorial Aguilar. pp. 335–338. ISBN 84-03-12057-5.
