= Possibilist Democratic Party =

Possibilist Democratic Party Partido Demócrata Posibilista
- Leader: Emilio Castelar
- Founded: 1879
- Dissolved: May 1893
- Split from: Federal Democratic Republican Party
- Merged into: Liberal Party
- Ideology: Liberalism; Republicanism; Progressivism

The Democratic Party (Spanish: Partido Demócrata, PD) was a Spanish political party created in 1879 by former Emilio Castelar as a split from the Federal Democratic Republican Party to contest the Spanish general election held in the same year. In 1884 it was renamed as the Possibilist Democratic Party (Spanish: Partido Demócrata Posibilista, PDP).

In 1893 most of it merged into the Liberal Party.

== See also ==
- Liberalism and radicalism in Spain
