= Enrique Díez Canedo =

Spanish poet, translator and literary critic (1879-1944)

The Most Excellent Enrique Díez-Canedo
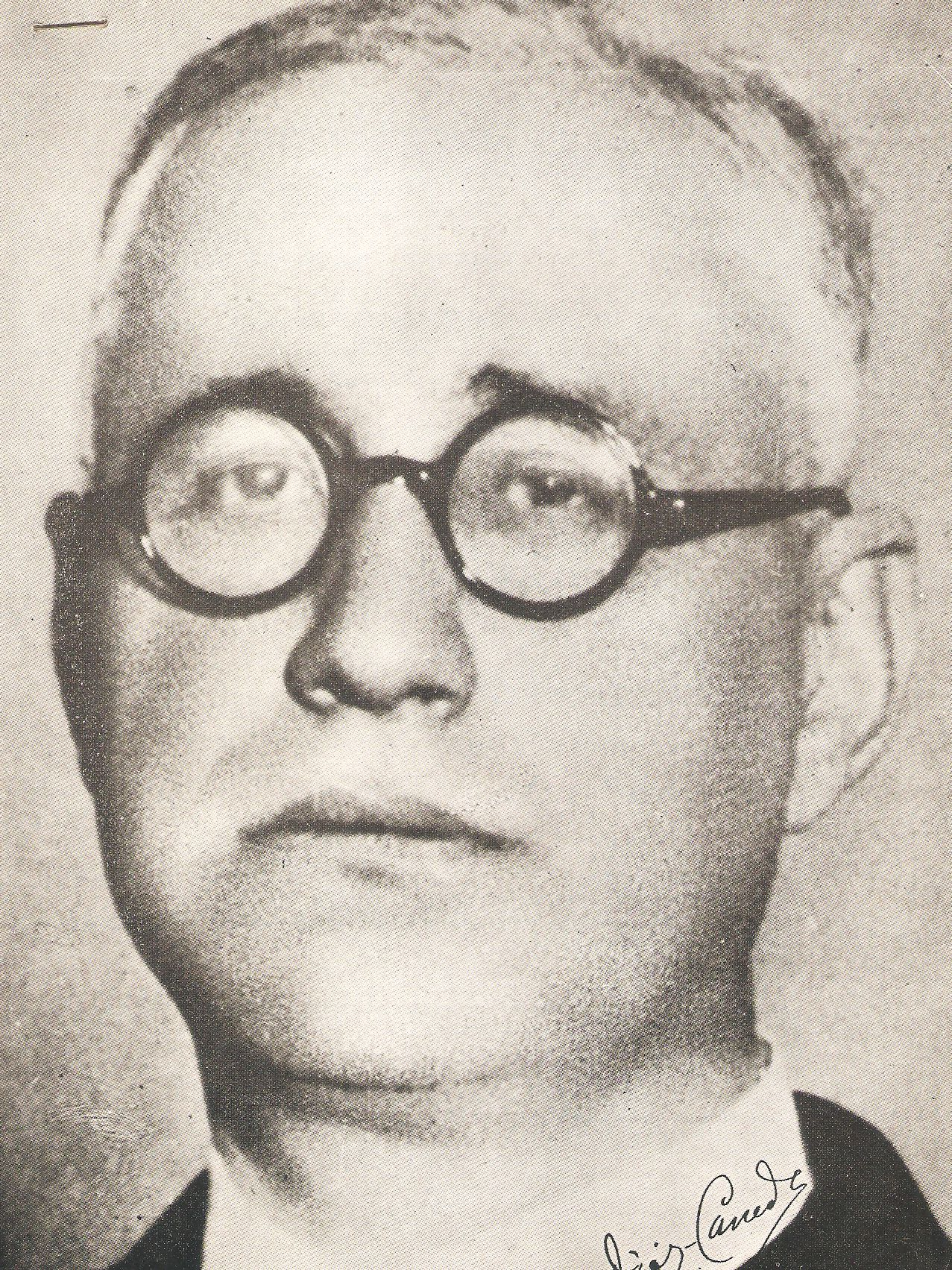
- Born: Enrique Díez-Canedo Reixa; 7 January 1879; Badajoz, Spain
- Died: 6 June 1944 (aged 65); Cuernavaca, Mexico

Seat R of the Real Academia Española
- In office 1 December 1935 – 6 June 1944
- Preceded by: Juan Gualberto López-Valdemoro de Quesada
- Succeeded by: Luis Martínez Kléiser

Enrique Díez-Canedo Reixa (Badajoz, 7 January 1879 – Cuernavaca, 6 June 1944) was a Spanish postmodernist poet, translator and literary critic.

== Early life ==
His maternal relatives came from an Extremaduran village called Alburquerque, but during his early years the family moved successively to Badajoz, Vigo, Port Bou, Valencia, and Barcelona; in this last city his parents died in a short period of time. Being an orphan, he moved to Madrid to study Law and, once he graduated and settled down, taught art history at the Escuela de Artes y Oficios, and French language and literature at the Escuela Central de Idiomas.

== Career ==
He sympathised with Krauseanism and was a denizen of the Ateneo, where he organized a number of acts (homages to Rubén Darío, Benito Pérez Galdós and Mariano de Cavia; and presentations like the one with José María Gabriel y Galán). He frequented the gathering of the Café Regina, where he became friend of Manuel Azaña, and started his poetic path publishing his first poems in Versos de las horas, 1906.

At the same tame, he started to collaborate with the press through El Liberal, where he publishes in 1903 a poem with an award given by that newspaper. This collaboration was followed by others in the magazine Renacimiento, and shortly after that his activities in journalism extend to literary and art criticism. He collaborates as a poetry critic in the magazine La Lectura, as an art critic in Diario Universal and in Faro, a publication that popularized the ideas of young men such as José Ortega y Gasset, Adolfo Posada, Gabriel Maura and Pedro de Répide. He also worked for Revista Latina and the Revista Crítica, directed by Francisco Villaespesa and Carmen de Burgos respectively. As a theatre critic he started with a series of articles in El Globo, 1908. He was among the contributors of the Madrid-based avant-garde magazine Prometeo.

== Diplomatic career ==
He was in Paris between years 1909 and 1911 as a secretary of the Ecuadorian ambassador. That didn't interrupt his journalist work, because he also wrote in España, El Sol, La Voz, La Pluma and Revista de Occidente. He also wrote for La Nación, from Buenos Aires. In 1921 he collaborated with Juan Ramón Jiménez in the making of the magazine Índice, because of his friendship with the Spanish poet.

== Mentor ==
Díez-Canedo also was involved in some publications with the purpose of introducing new writers and, for example, he published the first verses of León Felipe in the magazine España and also helped Juan Ramón Jiménez to publish some of his collaborations in El Sol. Thanks to him, a poem by Gerardo Diego was published in España. He also helped with reviews and critic articles about the works they were publishing. Among other numerous examples, it can be mentioned the case of Versos Humanos, by Gerardo Diego, of which he made an acute critic in La Nación.

== Translator ==
As a translator, he worked mainly with material from English and French, but also from Catalan and German. He translated authors like Paul Verlaine, Francis Jammes, Michel de Montaigne, John Webster, H. G. Wells, Heinrich Heine, Eugenio d'Ors and Walt Whitman.

Already in the middle of the Civil War, he collaborated with Hora de España' and participated in the Second International Writers in Defense of the Culture Congress; he directed the Madrid magazine as well.

In 1935 he was elected as a member of the Real Academia Española.

== Works ==
- Versos de las horas, 1906, poetry.
- La visita del sol, 1907, poetry.
- La sombra del ensueño, 1910, poetry.
- Imágenes, 1910, poetry.
- Sala de retratos, 1920, prose.
- Conversaciones literarias, 1921, literary criticism.
- Algunos versos, 1924, poetry.
- Epigramas americanos, 1928, poetry.
- Los dioses en el Prado, 1931.
