= Adolfo Luna y Ramos Isamat =

Spanish journalist and writer

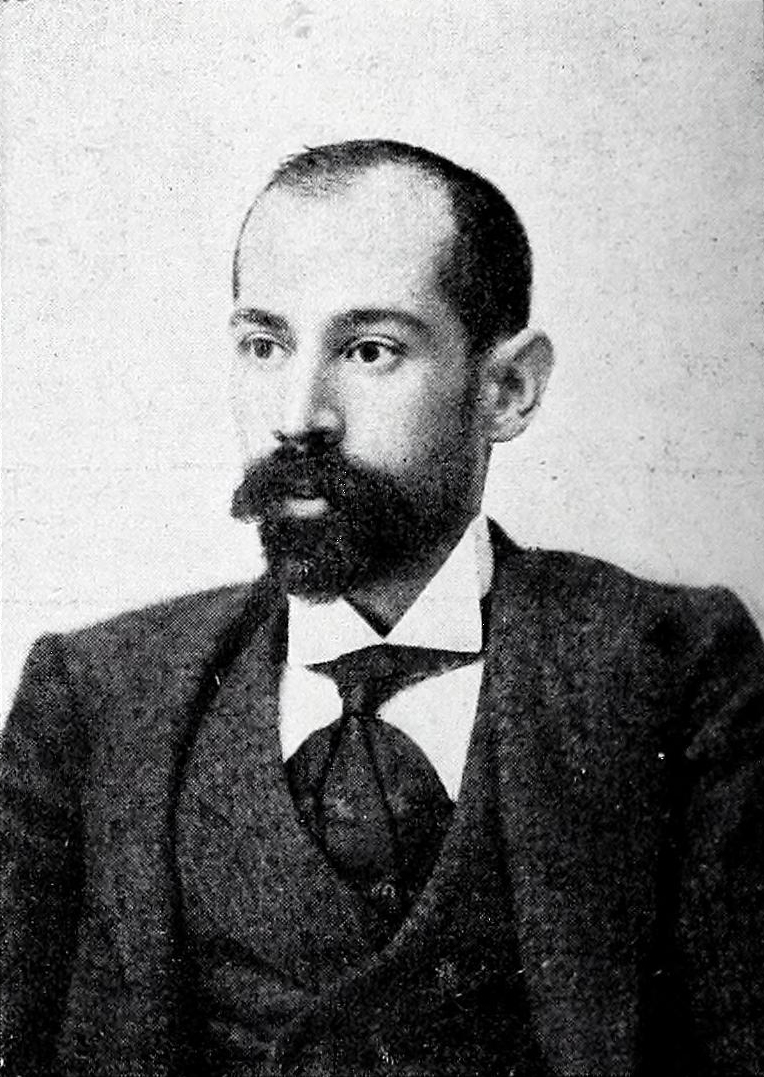
- Luna in 1902, photographed by Cifuentes
- Born: January 3 1871 Seville, Spain
- Died: November 28, 1902 (aged 31) Madrid, Spain

Adolfo Luna y Ramos Isamat (January 3, 1871, Seville – November 28, 1902, Madrid) was a Spanish journalist, playwright, and writer.

== Biography ==
He was born on January 3, 1871, in Seville. He participated in the Spanish fin-de-siècle bohemian scene, attending the literary gatherings at the Café de Madrid. He was an editor for the Madrid newspapers El País, El Progreso (1898), and El Heraldo de Madrid. He also contributed to La Ilustración Española, El Gato Negro, Electra, La Correspondencia de España, La Vida Literaria, El Liberal, and Sol y Sombra. He was also a playwright,and wrote works such as Jilguero chico (1901). He died young, on November 28, 1902. He frequently used the pseudonym "Flirt", at least according to Eugenio Hartzenbusch e Hiriart (Maxiriart) in El País.

Luna was hunchbacked and had suffered from a chronic illness since adolescence; Pérez Nieva described him physically as "small, disproportionate, with long arms, a complete hunchback".

== Sources ==
- Anonymous (December 4, 1902), "Adolfo Luna", Sol y Sombra (in Spanish), no. 314
- Arco Bravo, Miguel Ángel del (2013). "Periodismo y bohemia" [Journalism and bohemianism]. Estudios sobre el Mensaje Periodístico (in Spanish). 19 (2). UCM: 943–960. ISSN 1988-2696.
- Granjel, Luis S. (August–September 1967). "Rubén Darío "fin de siglo"" [Rubén Darío "end of the century"]. Cuadernos Hispanoamericanos (in Spanish) (212–213). Madrid: Instituto de Cultura Hispánica: 265–279. ISSN 0011-250X.
- Luna, Adolfo (1901). Jilguero chico: sainete lírico en un acto, dividido en seis cuadros, en prosa y verso original de Adolfo Luna ; música de los maestros Calleja y Lleó [The Little Goldfinch: a lyrical farce in one act, divided into six scenes, in prose and verse by Adolfo Luna; music by the composers Calleja and Lleó] (in Spanish). Madrid: R. Velasco.
- Maxiriarth (1904). Unos cuantos seudónimos de escritores españoles: con sus correspondientes nombres verdaderos [A few pseudonyms of Spanish writers: with their corresponding real names] (in Spanish). Madrid: Est. tip. "Sucesores de Rivadeneyra".
- Méndez Bejarano, Mario (1922). "1.477.—Luna y Ramos (Adolfo)". Diccionario de escritores, maestros y oradores naturales de Sevilla y su actual provincia [Dictionary of writers, teachers, and orators native to Seville and its current province] (in Spanish). Vol. I. Seville: Tipografía Gironés.
- Muela Bermejo, Diana (2014). "La revista La Vida Literaria (1899) como reflejo de una nueva estética finisecular" [The magazine La Vida Literaria (1899) as a reflection of a new fin-de-siècle aesthetic.] (PDF). Anales de Literatura Española (in Spanish) (26). UA: 309–326. ISSN 0212-5889.
- Ossorio y Bernard, Manuel (1903). "Luna (Adolfo)". Ensayo de un catálogo de periodistas españoles del siglo XIX [Essay on a catalog of Spanish journalists of the 19th century] (in Spanish). Madrid: Imprenta y litografía de J. Palacios.
- Pérez Nieva, A. (December 8, 1902). "Revista de Madrid. Bodas castizas.—Las denuncias.—Adolfo Luna.—El perro policiaco.—Estrenos" [Madrid Magazine. Traditional Madrid Weddings.—The Complaints.—Adolfo Luna.—The Police Dog.—Premieres]. La Dinastía (in Spanish). No. 8.768. Barcelona. p. 1. ISSN 2254-5352.
