= José de Carvajal y Hué =

Spanish lawyer, economist, writer and politician

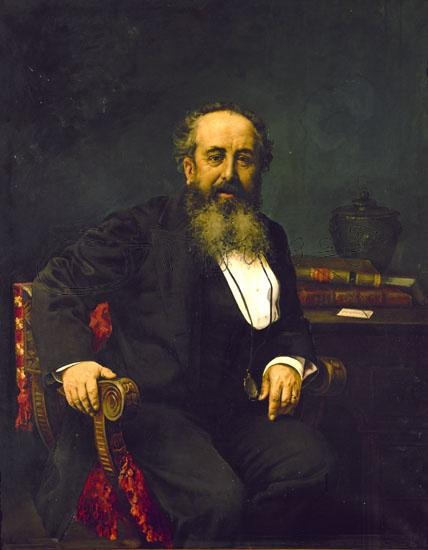
- Portrait of José de Carvajal by José María Fenollera; in the Ministry of Economy and Finance.
- Born: 8 October 1835; Málaga, Spain
- Died: 4 June 1899 (aged 63); Madrid, Spain
- Occupations: Lawyer; Economist; Writer; Politician

José de Carvajal y Hué (8 October 1835 in Málaga, Spain – 4 June 1899 in Madrid, Spain) was a Spanish lawyer, economist, writer and politician who served as Minister of State from 1873 to 1874, during the presidency of Emilio Castelar y Ripoll in the First Spanish Republic.

Political offices
Preceded by Santiago Soler	Minister of State; 7 September 1873 – 3 January 1874	Succeeded by Práxedes Mateo Sagasta
