= Francisco Acebal =

Spanish novelist, playwright and journalist

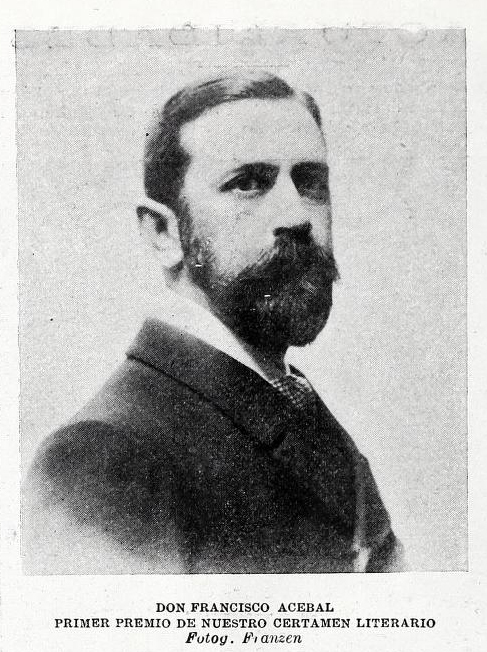
Francisco Acebal in Blanco y Negro (1901)

Francisco López Acebal (5 April 1866, in Gijón – 5 September 1933) was a Spanish novelist, playwright and journalist.

== Education ==
He began his studies at the Institute Jovellanos of his native town and continued with Escolapios Madrid. He graduated in Law from the Universidad Central. Although he had begun his literary career at thirteen in the Gijón daily El Comercio, his first literary success was reached in 1900, when he won with his novella Aires de mar the first prize in a competition of the magazine Blanco y Negro, on whose judging panel were José Echegaray, Benito Pérez Galdós and José Ortega Munilla. Since then he collaborated on the top newspapers and magazines in Spain (Blanco y Negro, Helios, Hojas Selectas, ABC, La Ilustración Española y Americana, etc.) and Latin America (Journal of the Marina of Havana, and La Nación, in Buenos Aires).

== Career ==
A Krausism sympathizer, in 1901 he founded and afterwards led La Lectura (Journal of Science and Arts) (1901-1920), the most prestigious intellectual journal of his time, from whose pages he promoted authors of the Generation of 98 and whose shadow appeared after two collections of famous books: Pedagogía Moderna (Modern Pedagogy) and Clásicos Castellanos (Classical Castilian), associated with the ideas of the Institución Libre de Enseñanza and the Center for Historical Studies respectively. He worked closely on these projects with Julián Juderías, Domingo Barnés Salinas and others. In 1907 he was appointed Deputy Secretary of the Board for Advanced Studies and Research, where he helped the Secretary José Castillejo to train new generations of scientists.

== Work ==
In Acebal's theatrical works there are evident influences by Benito Pérez Galdós and the comedy of Jacinto Benavente. He adapted the dramatic formula of several novels of the first such as El amigo Manso, which was much celebrated on its premiere at the Odeon Theatre on November 20, 1917 or Misericordia. More important is his narrative, which contains a careful language, with novels that have been translated into English (Dolorosa, for example, 1904), French, Portuguese and Dutch. He left quite a few unpublished works.

== Works ==
=== Novels ===
- From good stock Madrid, 1902 (A. March).
- Dolorosa, Madrid: Bookstore General Victoriano Suarez, 1904. Reprinted Oviedo: Royal Institute of Asturian Studies, 1999, with an introduction by José María Roca Franquesa.
- Head to head, 1905.
- Calvary (contemporary novel of manners), Barcelona: Montaner and Simon, 1905.

=== Short Narrative ===
- Footprint souls, Madrid, Reading Library, 1901.
- From my corner, Salamanca, 1902.
- Penumbra, Madrid: Graphics Press, 1924.
- Mystical Rose, Madrid: The Contemporaries, 1909.

=== Theatre ===
- Never ', Madrid, 1905 (Typography Magazine Files) comedy.
- A modern, Madrid: Renaissance, 1914, comedy in two acts.
- The ancestors Madrid, 1920 (Typ. of the Journal Archives)
- Mercy
- A good will
- Gusts of passion. Madrid: The Contemporaries, 1925. Comedy.
- Clay dolls.
- The gentle friend. Three-act stage adaptation of the novel of the same title by Perez Galdos Madrid, 1917.

== Bibliography ==
- Antonio Marco García, Francisco López Acebal y sus aportaciones a la cultura española del siglo XX ((in English): Francisco López Acebal and his contributions to twentieth century Spanish culture). In: Archivum: Revista de la Facultad de Filología Volumes 46-47, 1996, pages 303-325.
- Andrés González Blanco, Historia de la novela en España desde el Romanticismo a nuestros días ((in English): History of the novel in Spain from Romanticism to Our Day), Madrid, 1909.
- José María Roca Franquesa, La obra novelística de Francisco López Acebal ((in English): The novelistic work of Francisco López Acebal). Offprint Factitia of the Boletín del Instituto de Estudios Asturianos. No. 84-85. Oviedo, 1975.
- Constantino Suárez, Escritores y artistas asturianos ((in English): Asturian writers and artists) (1934).
