= European War Office =

Humanitarian office for victims of WWI, established in Spain

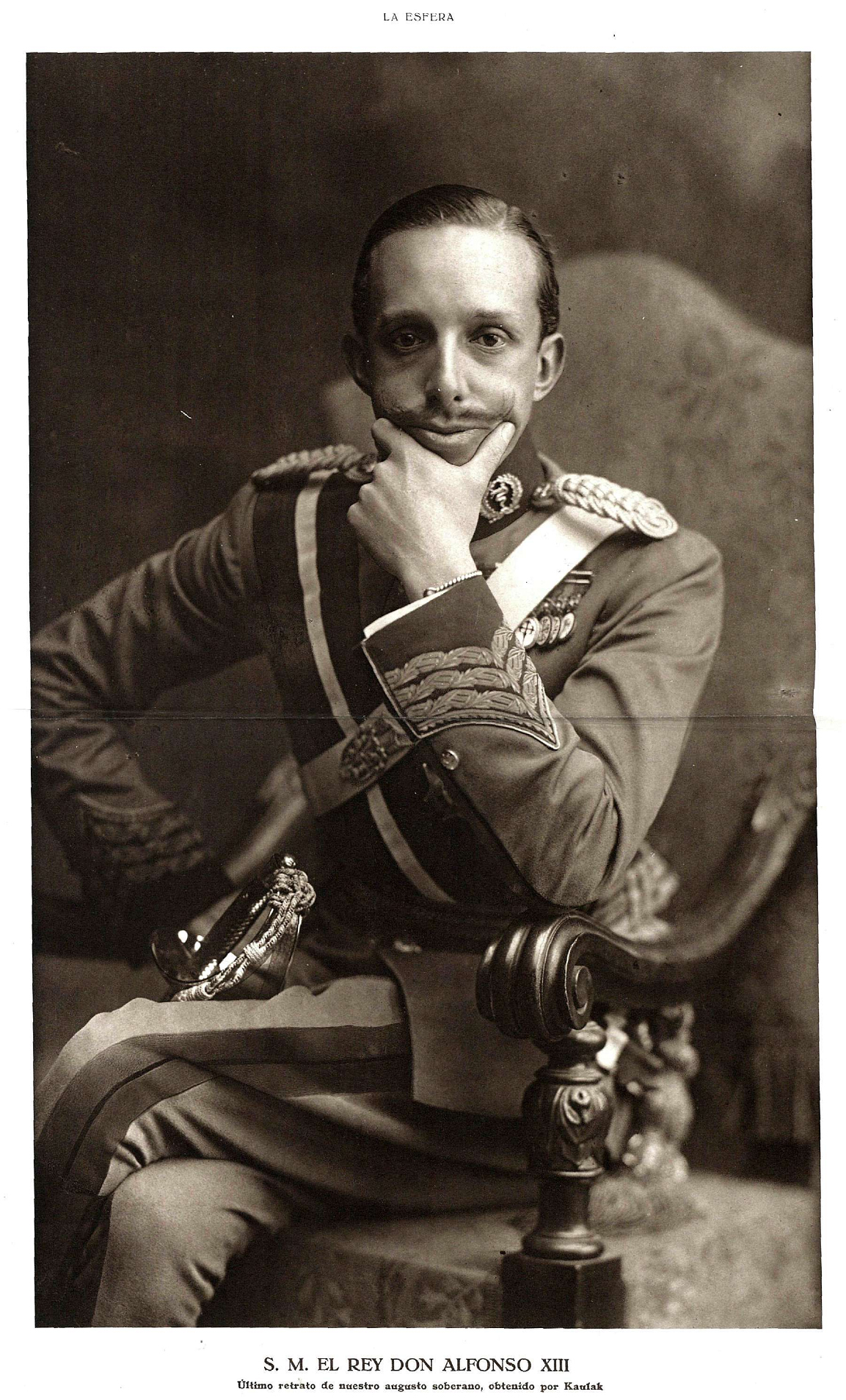
King Alfonso XIII in 1915; photograph by Kaulak

The European War Office (Spanish: Oficina de la Guerra Europea or Oficina Pro Cautivos) was a humanitarian office created by King Alfonso XIII of Spain to help the victims of the First World War, regardless of their allegiance, or whether they were of military or civilian status. The War Office was governed directly by the Private Secretary of the King; it was based in the Royal Palace of Madrid.

One of the King's most imperative achievements was to create a compromise between both sides of the conflict, to prevent the further sinking of hospital ships. As consequence of this, Spanish naval observers sailed hospital ships of various countries, in order to ensure that the vessels were being used for their intended purpose, as opposed to military expeditions. The King also collaborated in the creation of a dedicated signal code for hospital ships.

== Spanish neutrality ==
In the interim of World War I, Spain remained neutral due to several inducements. One of these, more esteemed, reasons for the King, was because of his family bonds—his wife being British and his mother being Austrian, among other family relations. Nonetheless, this did not prevent the King from forming the European War Office, thus, expressing involvement in the war.

On August 7, 1914, it was published in Gaceta de Madrid, a Royal Decree, signed by both King Alfonso and Prime Minister Eduardo Dato, declared the country's neutrality, stating that government had the "duty to order the strictest neutrality to Spanish subjects in accordance with the laws in force and the principles of public international law".

For the Government, there was no purpose to engage in the conflict, especially considering that there were not enough resources to do so— a reason which the political and economic class conceded upon. King Alfonso also agreed, despite having talked with the French ambassador of his desire to enter the conflict on the side of the Allies in exchange of "some tangible satisfaction," presumably referring to Tangier.

Another consequential rationale for the government's neutrality was the precariousness of its armed forces. The army was involved in fighting numerous insurgencies in its North-African protectorate of Morocco. This situation strained the outdated, undersupplied, underfunded and asymmetrical army, that had an oversized officer corps which absorbed most of its budget. The Navy's reputation was impaired due to the defeat in the Spanish-American War of 1898. It was not until a decade later when the government started again to invest in new warships, however, the Navy was not ready to engage great powers.

Social unrest must also be mentioned, as a result of growing support of the labor movement and the appearance of left-wing republican parties, which threatened to initiate a Republican revolution.

== The Office ==
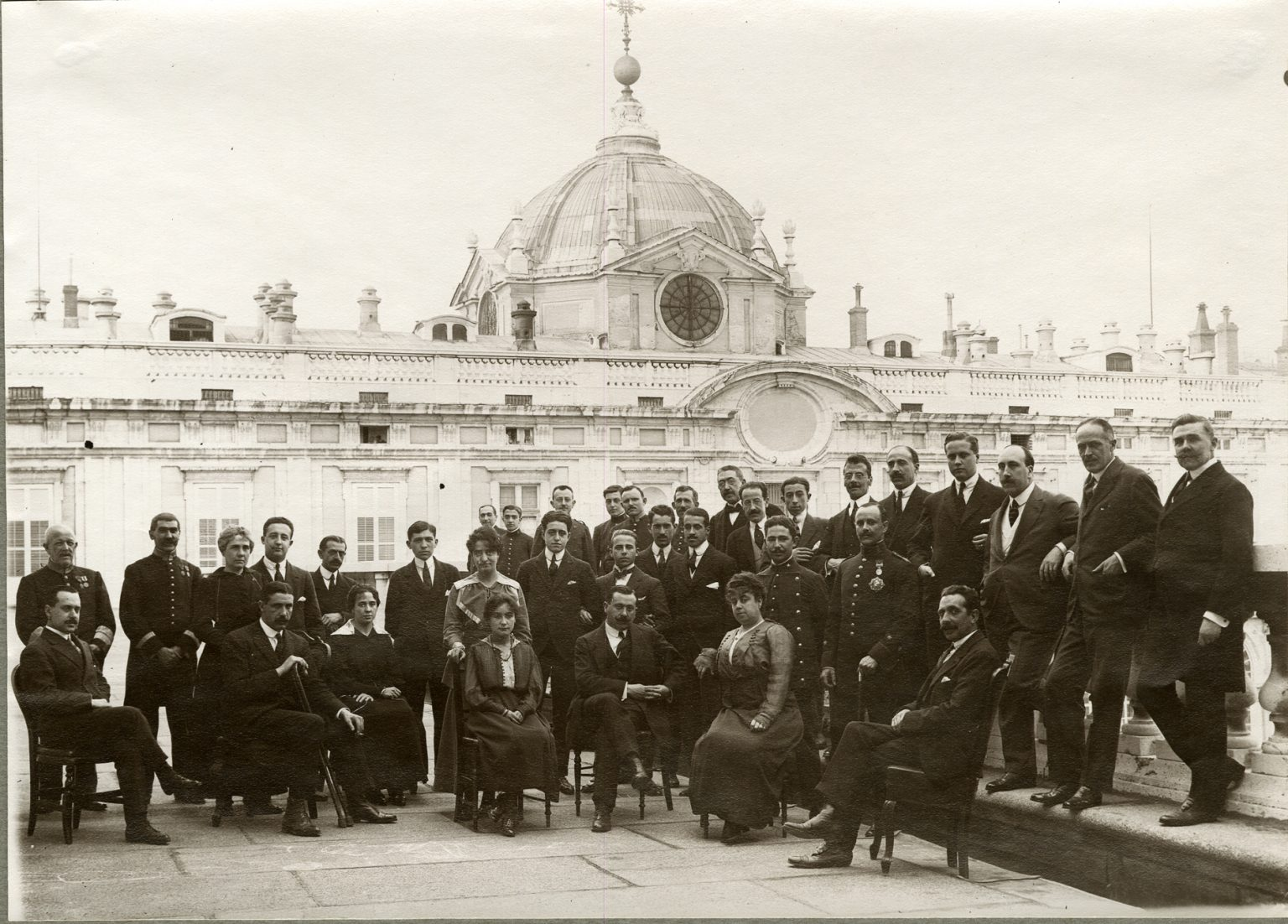
European War Office staff. Royal Palace of Madrid. 1917.

The Office, was formed in, approximately, 1914 with seven staff. A publication in a French newspaper, Le Petit Girondais, provoked an avalanche of letters from many Europeans asking for aid. This compelled the King to enlarge the Office to 48 staff members, all of them speaking several languages, assisted by many volunteers. A notable member of the Office was historian and translator Julián Juderías, who spoke 15 languages.

The office worked in coordination with the Red Cross and was structured in several sections:

- Missing People.
- Information and Correspondence in Occupied Territories.
- Prisoners.
- Repatriations of Soldiers Severely Wounded or Sick.
- Repatriations of Civilians.
- Internment Service in Switzerland.
- Pardons.
- Commutations of Sentences.
- Remittance of Funds to Individuals and Families in Occupied Territories.
- Reports on Inspection Visits by Spanish Delegates.

The Office admitted more than 200,000 letters —140,000 of them from the families of soldiers— all of whom were answered thanks to, what Juan José Alonso Martín, director of the Palace General Archives, has described as "a primitive computing system."

The efforts of the King was not only to find people's relatives but to cease the practice of capital punishment. It is calculated that approximately 100 were saved from execution thanks to the Office —including French and German soldiers. The King even tried to save Tsar Nicholas II of Russia and his family, with no success. The Palace General Archives have more than 90 documents sent to St. Petersburg that proves the efforts to liberate or visit the Tsar —the Office's staff visited more than 4,000 prisoners over all Europe— but the Romanovs were already dead when the rescue operation began. However, the King was not sure of the fate of the Tsarina and her children so he and his Office continued.

There is evidence that his efforts were instrumental in easing the German occupation of Belgium, so that provisions from the United States could reach its nine million inhabitants.

=== Recognition ===
Diplomats involved in the operation received the Reconnaissance Française medal, the women received the Red Cross medal and the rest of the staff received the Order of Isabella the Catholic.

King Alfonso himself was thanked by the people of Belgium and Italy in 1923. He was also greatly admired around the world. A young English girl even wrote this prayer which appeared in a newspaper: "And God bless Father and Mother, and Nurse, and send Father back soon from his horrid prison in Germany. And God bless specially the dear King of Spain who found out about Father. Amen."

In 1917, King Alfonso was nominated for the Nobel Peace Prize, but it was given to the International Committee of the Red Cross. He was nominated again in 1933, when already in exile. In honor of its Royal status, Le Meurice Hotel has a room with his name, Suite Royale Alphonse XIII, where the acclaimed Spanish painter Salvador Dalí spent one month every year for thirty years.

== Featured cases ==
- French actor and singer Maurice Chevalier was taken prisoner in Germany; it was thanks to the secret intervention of King Alfonso that he was released.
- Russian ballet dancer Vaslav Nijinsky was arrested in Budapest, Hungary and was released thanks to the intervention, among other international leaders, of King Alfonso.
- In the Royal Palace's archive exists a complaint about the bad situation of future French president Charles de Gaulle made by the Spanish inspectors and sent by the King to a war camp.
- Being only 8-years-old, a French girl named Sylviane Sartor sent a letter to the King asking him to find her uncle, a war prisoner, saying that the deed would enlighten her mother. She said the following: "Your Majesty, Mother is crying all the time because her brother has been taken prisoner. She has just received a letter that says he will die of hunger. Your Majesty, if you could send him to Switzerland… because Mother is certainly going to make herself ill. Your Majesty, I thank you in advance. Your servant, Sylviane". The King replied, asking for more information: "Dear Miss, I will do my best to stop your mother from crying. So be so good as to send me exact news of your uncle so that I can take the matter further. Alfonso XIII, King." The prisoner was Achille Delmonte, found in a camp in Hanover, Germany and sent back to Switzerland with his family.
- The French prime minister asked the King to attempt to get the repatriation of 20,000 French civilians that the war had suppressed in the enemy zone, and that they were to be deported to internment camps. Alfonso XIII achieved their liberation in several months, and France considered him a war hero henceforth.
- The efforts of the Office were unsuccessful in the search for John Kipling, the only son of the Nobel Prize for Literature holder Rudyard Kipling. His remains were not found and identified until 1922.

== Public exhibition ==
Nowadays, all these letters and documents from the European War Office are property of the Royal Palace of Madrid archives and they were displayed as part of a public exhibition called Letters to the King. The humanitarian activities of Alfonso XIII during the Great War between November 8, 2018, and March 3, 2019. It was held in the Genoa Rooms of the Royal Palace of Madrid.

== See also ==
- Ministry of Supply
- World War I
- Diplomacy
