= Gabriel Miró =

Spanish author

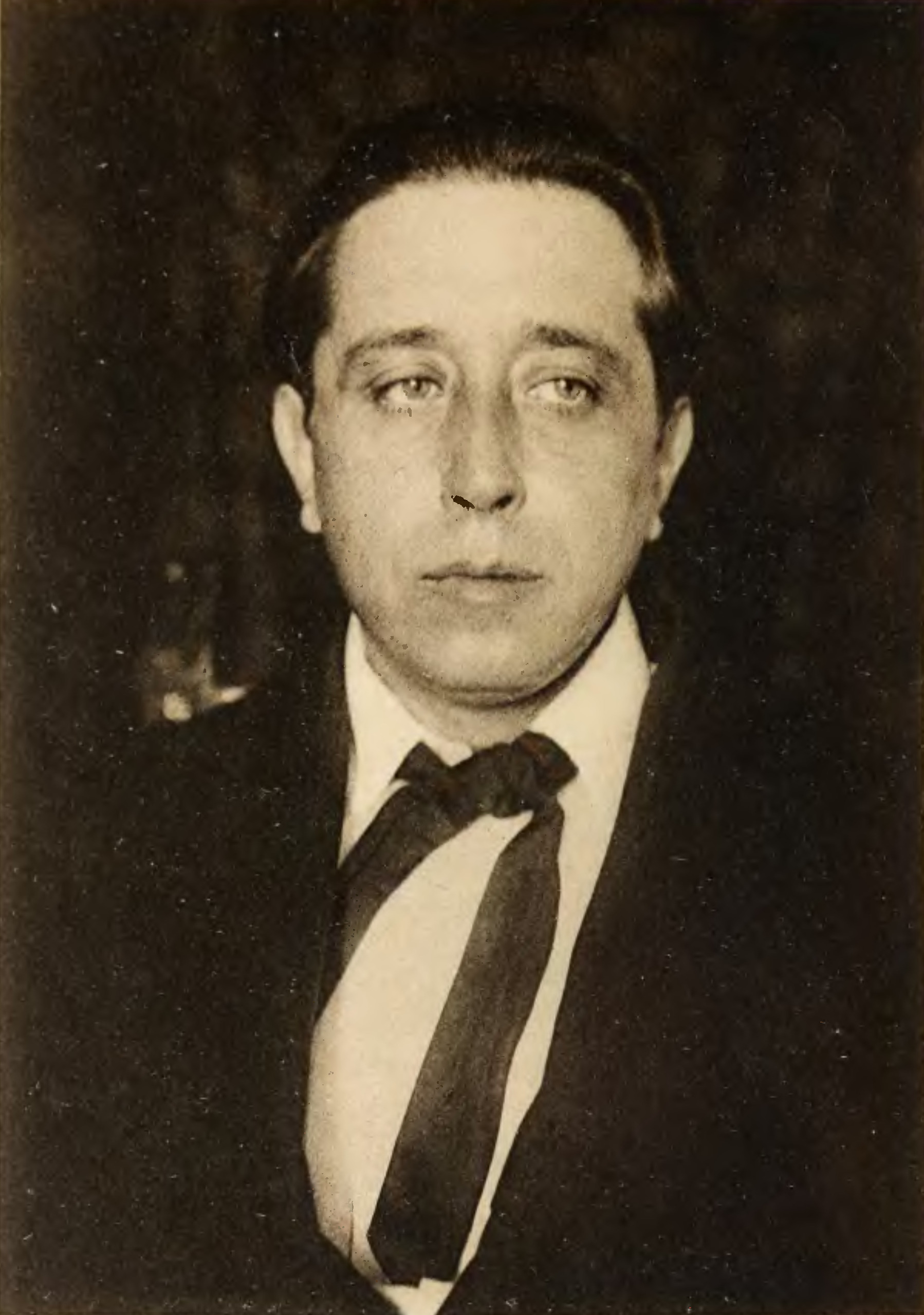
Gabriel Miró

Gabriel Miró Ferrer (/miːˈroʊ/; Alicante, 28 July 1879 – Madrid, 24 May 1930), known as Gabriel Miró, was a Spanish modernist writer. In 1900 he finished his studies in law at the University of Granada and the University of Valencia. He focused mainly on writing novels, but also collaborated to a large number of newspapers such as: El Heraldo, Los Lunes de El Imparcial, ABC and El Sol. He was among the contributors of the Madrid-based avant-garde magazine Prometeo between 1908 and 1912. The rich and poetic language, the philosophical and theological ideas, and the subtle irony are some of the main characteristics of his works. Gabriel Miró preferred to focus on the intimate world of his characters and its development, in the inner relations between everything in their surrounding and the way they evolve in time.

He is the author of more than 20 novels. Most critics believe that Gabriel Miró's literary maturity begins with Las cerezas del cementerio (Cemetery cherries) (1910), whose plot revolves around the tragic love of the super-sensitive young man Félix Valdivia for an older woman (Beatriz) and presents—with an atmosphere of voluptuousness and lyrical intimism—the themes of eroticism, illness, and death.

== Work ==
In 1915 he published El abuelo del rey (The King's grandfather), a novel that tells the story of three generations of a tiny Levantine town, for the sake of presenting, and not without a little irony, the struggle between tradition and progress, the pressures of one's environment, and above all, a meditation about time.

One year later, Figuras de la Pasión del Señor (Characters from Our Lord Passion) (1916–17) was published, formed by a series of scenes about the last days of Jesus. Also in 1917, Miró began his autobiographical-style works with Libro de Sigüenza (Sigüenza's book), in which Sigüenza is not only the heteronym or alter-ego of the author, but the author's own lyrical self, which gives unity to the scenes which comprise the book.

El humo dormido (The sleeping smoke) (1919) is one of his most personal books and contains various autobiographical moments. There the author mingles reflections on topics like childhood, life, death, friendship, innocence, imagination, faith and beauty. These are also the main topics of his literary works as a whole. In Años y leguas (Years and leagues) (1928) he again turns back to his character of Sigüenza as a protagonist, are of a similar nature.

In 1921, he finished two more books: El ángel, el molino, el caracol del faro (The angel, the mill, the lighthouse snail), a book of scenes, and the novel Nuestro padre San Daniel (Our father Saint Daniel), which is part of a series with El obispo leproso (The leprous bishop) (1926). Both play out in the Levantine city of Oleza, a reflection of Orihuela, in the last third of the 19th century. The city, submerged in lethargy, is seen as a microcosm of mysticism and sensuality, in which the characters debate between their natural inclinations and social repression, and intolerance and the religious resistance to progress to which they are submitted.

Ricardo Gullón has described the Miró's stories as lyrical novels. They pay more attention to the expression of feelings and sensations than the simple act of listing events. The hallmarks of Miró's work are:

1. The use of the ellipsis and
2. The structuring of the story in disparate scenes, joined by reflection and memory

Impermanence is the essential theme of the author, who incorporates the past into a continuing present, through sensations, evocation, and memory.

Like Azorín before him, the senses are a form of creation and knowledge in Miró's work, hence

1. the vivid style of his work,
2. the use of synthesis and sensory images
3. surprising adjectives and
4. a lavish vocabulary

For background on his reading Macdonald's monograph, Gabriel Miró: his private library and his literary background. provides illumination.
