= Santiago Soler y Pla =

Spanish politician

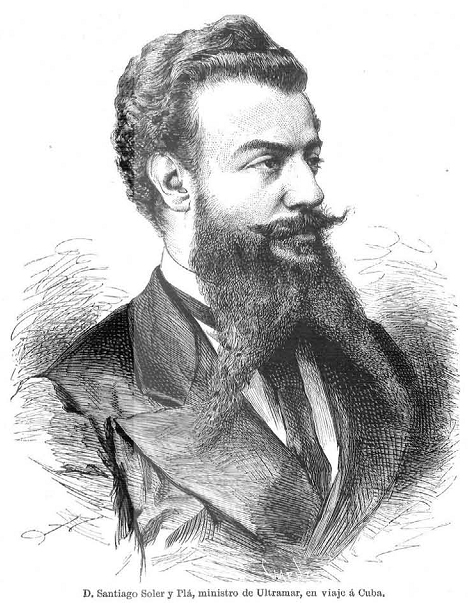
Santiago Soler y Pla

Santiago Soler y Pla (12 March 1839, in Barcelona, Spain – 1888) was a Spanish politician who served as Minister of State in 1873, during the presidency of Nicolás Salmerón of the First Spanish Republic. Soler held other important offices such as Mayor of Barcelona in 1869.

Political offices
Preceded by Eleuterio Maisonnave	Minister of State; 18 July 1873 – 7 September 1873	Succeeded by José de Carvajal
