= Ministry of Supply (Spain) =

- Ministerio de Abastecimientos

Agency overview
- Formed: September 3, 1918
- Preceding agency: General Commissariat of Supply
- Dissolved: May 8, 1920
- Superseding agency: Ministry of Public Works
- Type: Ministry
- Jurisdiction: Government of Spain

The Ministry of Supply (Spanish: Ministerio de Abastecimientos) was a department of the Government of Spain formed in 1918 responsible for ensuring the supply and distribution of food and other goods relevant to the country's economic survival. It also assumed other powers related to strengthening the expansion of the Spanish economy after the Great War.

The Ministry of Supply assumed the powers of the General Commissariat of Supply, a government agency created in 1917 due to the crisis that Spain suffered in that year. The Ministry was abolished in May 1920 and its responsibilities passed to the newly created General Commissariat of Subsistence of the Ministry of Public Works.

== History ==
=== Context ===
When the I World War started on 28 July 1914, Spain was an economically backward country (with only the Basque Country and Catalonia with an important industry), a country that after the 1898 Spanish-American War and the 1899 treaty with Germany had ended its former colonial empire (Cuba, the Philippines and Puerto Rico). The country was morally shattered, with the government system of the "turno" in question, with an Army that was outdated, almost without a Navy, and with an active conflict with Morocco that led to crisis and strikes like Tragic Week in 1909. In addition, Spain did not belong to either of the two European alliances faced in the war. In 1913, Spain established a protectorate in the north of Morocco, which became a source of continuous military problems and it was not possible to pacify until 1927.

The conservative government of Eduardo Dato decided to keep Spain neutral, shared by the majority of the ruling class. As Manuel Azaña claimed, the decision "was a forced neutrality, imposed by our own defenselessness". Neutrality had important economic and social consequences as there was a huge boost in the process of "modernization" that had started timidly in 1900, due to the considerable increase in Spanish industrial production that suddenly opened new markets (the ones of the belligerent countries). However, inflation skyrocketed as wages grew at a slower pace and there were shortages of necessities, such as bread, which led to riots of livelihoods in several cities and labor conflicts also grow led by the two major unions, the CNT and the UGT, which demanded salary increases that, at the end, would slow the decline in real wages due to inflation.

=== First measures ===
The government's concern about possible social conflicts, which could be triggered by supply and inflation difficulties, led the Dato government to create the Supreme Subsistence Board in 1916 under the Subsistence Act of 1915 to guarantee supplies throughout the National territory. Its performance was so useless that in May of the following year it was dissolved. However, reality prevented disregarding the problem and a more efficient solution was sought, creating the General Commissariat for Supply.

This institution was directed by a single person, a Commissioner, at whose service were officials of the ministries of Finance, Development and Home Affairs. Its functions were, according to the Royal Decree of creation; to monitor the proper functioning of the internal supply; the purchase, if necessary, of foreign wheat, raise budgets to the Ministry of Development on necessary transport and to the Ministry of Finance regarding exports and imports. The Commissariat' acts were endorsed by the President of the Council of Ministers. The dependence of several ministries, as well as the endorsement of the President of the Council of Ministers limited the work of the Commissariat, so prime minister Antonio Maura decided to elevate the commissariat to ministerial rank being its first holder Juan Ventosa, until then commissioner.

=== Ministry ===
The Ministry was created on September 3, 1918 from the existing Supply Commissariat. The Ministry survived the end of World War I, but was abolished in May 1920 and it was replaced by the General Commissariat of Subsistence, within the Ministry of Development.

According to the magazine El Año Político, "everyone celebrated the elimination of this department" which "seemed to have had no other objective than to hinder the distribution and increase the cost of basic products" and which "will remain in history as a stain on the Spanish Administration".

== List of ministers ==
Name	Term		Duration	Party	Government		Ref.
Juan Ventosa	3 September 1918	9 November 1918	67 days	Catalan Regionalist	Antonio Maura	Alfonso XIII (1886–1931)	
Pablo Garnica y Echevarría	9 November 1918	5 December 1918	26 days	Liberal	The Marquess of Alhucemas	Alfonso XIII (1886–1931)	
Baldomero Argente	5 December 1918	21 February 1919	78 days	Liberal	The Count of Romanones	Alfonso XIII (1886–1931)	
Leonardo Rodríguez Díaz	21 February 1919	17 April 1919	55 days	Liberal	The Count of Romanones	Alfonso XIII (1886–1931)	
Leonardo Rodríguez Díaz	21 February 1919	17 April 1919	55 days	Liberal	Antonio Maura	Alfonso XIII (1886–1931)	
José Maestre Pérez	17 April 1919	20 July 1919	94 days	Conservative	Antonio Maura	Alfonso XIII (1886–1931)	
The Marquess of Mochales	20 July 1919	21 July 1919	1 day	Conservative	Joaquín Sánchez de Toca	Alfonso XIII (1886–1931)	
Carlos Cañal y Migolla	23 July 1919	28 September 1919	67 days	Conservative	Joaquín Sánchez de Toca	Alfonso XIII (1886–1931)	
The Count of San Luis	28 September 1919	12 December 1919	75 days	Conservative	Joaquín Sánchez de Toca	Alfonso XIII (1886–1931)	
Luis Rodríguez de Viguri; Acting	13 December 1919	15 December 1919	2 days	Conservative	Manuel Allendesalazar	Alfonso XIII (1886–1931)	
Francisco Terán Morales	15 December 1919	5 May 1920	142 days	Conservative	Manuel Allendesalazar	Alfonso XIII (1886–1931)	
Luis Rodríguez de Viguri; Acting	5 May 1920	8 May 1920	3 days	Conservative	Eduardo Dato	Alfonso XIII (1886–1931)	

== See also ==
- European War Office
- Spain during World War I
