= Carlos Cañal y Migolla =

Spanish lawyer, archaeologist and politician

Carlos Cañal
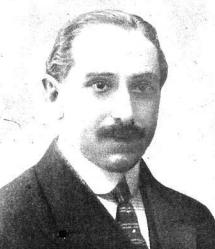
- Photograph of Cañal (1922)

Minister of Supply
- In office 23 July 1919 – 28 September 1919
- Preceded by: Miguel López de Carrizosa y de Giles
- Succeeded by: Fernando de Sartorius y Chacón

Minister of Labour
- In office 8 May 1920 – 13 March 1921
- Succeeded by: Eduardo Sanz y Escartín

Minister of Grace and Justice
- In office 4 December 1922 – 7 December 1922
- Preceded by: Mariano Ordóñez García
- Succeeded by: Count of Romanones

Deputy in Cortes
- In office 1903–1923
- Constituency: Utrera and Sanlúcar la Mayor

Member of the National Consultative Assembly
- In office 1927–1930

Personal details
- Born: September 3, 1876 Seville, Spain
- Died: September 11, 1938 (aged 62) Sanlúcar de Barrameda, Spain
- Occupation: Military and politician

Carlos Cañal y Migolla (Seville, 3 September 1876 – Sanlúcar de Barrameda, 11 September 1938) was a Spanish lawyer, archaeologist, and politician. He served as Minister of Supply, Minister of Labour, and Minister of Grace and Justice during the reign of Alfonso XIII.

== Biography ==
Carlos Cañal was born on 3 September 1876. He was a law graduate, archaeologist, and historian. In October 1896, he obtained a Doctorate in Philosophy and Letters from the Faculty of Philosophy and Letters at the Central University. In 1899, he was appointed as a councilor of the Seville City Council.

In his youth, he was dedicated to archaeology and served as an assistant professor at the University of Seville. He became a member of the Real Academia Sevillana de Buenas Letras. Aligned with the Conservative Party, he obtained a seat as a deputy for the electoral district of Utrera following the 1903 elections. In the elections of 1907, 1910, 1914, 1916, 1918, and 1919 he was re-elected as a deputy for Sanlúcar la Mayor. He held the post of prosecutor of the Supreme Court (equivalent to the current Prosecutor General of the State) from 16 June to 14 November 1917.

He held the post of Minister of Supplies between 23 July and 28 September 1919 in a Sánchez Toca cabinet. Subsequently, he was the first Minister of Labour, occupying the portfolio between 8 May 1920 and 13 March 1921, in a government presided over by Eduardo Dato. Finally, he would become Minister of Grace and Justice between 4 and 7 December 1922 in a Sánchez Guerra cabinet. Between 1927 and 1930, he was a member of the National Assembly of Primo de Rivera's dictatorship.

In 1927, he was appointed member of the Permanent Commission of the Ibero-American Exposition and in 1930, he was appointed Regional Commissioner-President of the Ibero-American Exposition in Seville.
