= La Lectura =

Monthly literary and arts magazine in Spain (1901–1920

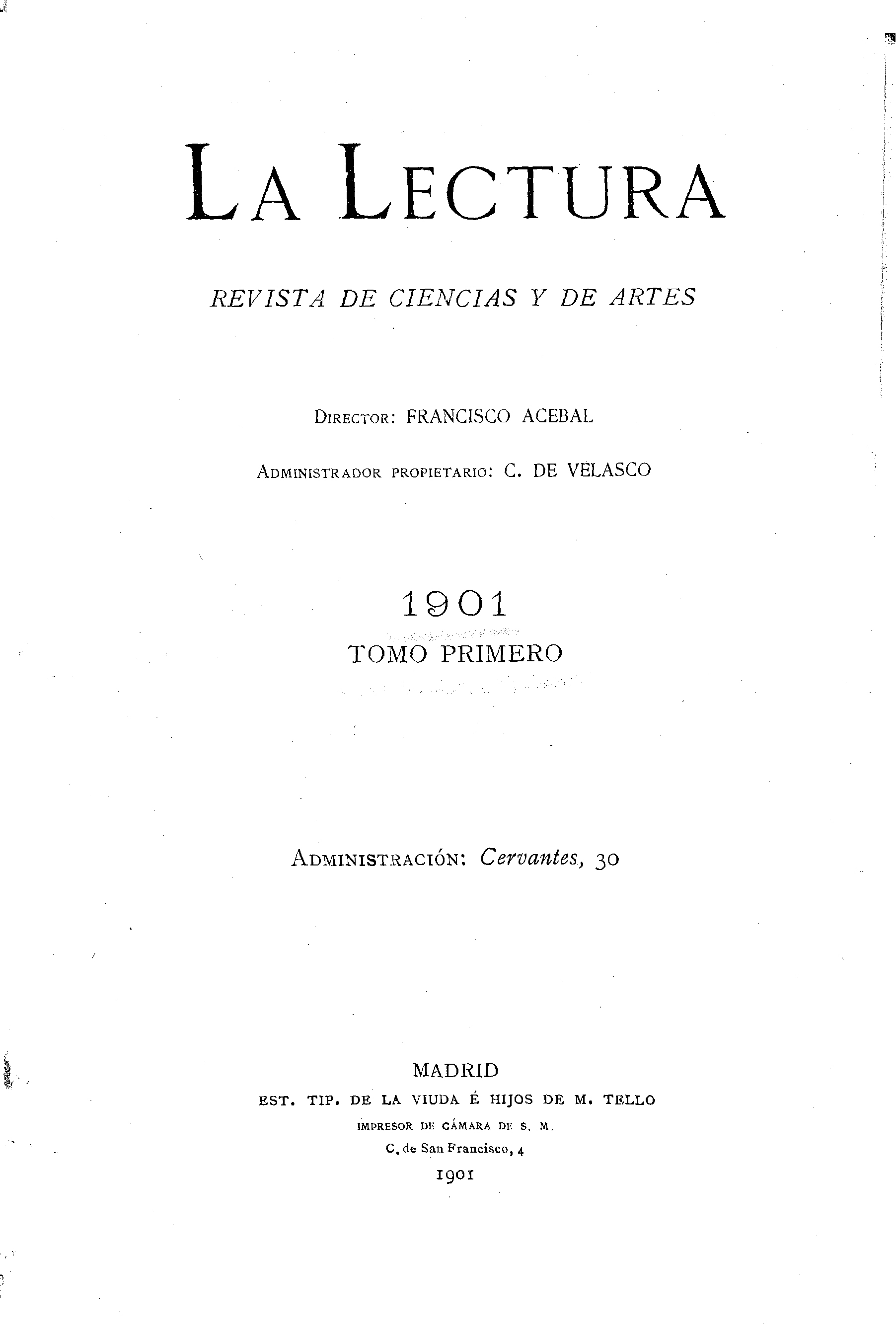
- Cover page of the first issue
- Categories: Literary magazine; Arts magazine
- Frequency: Monthly
- Founder: Francisco Acebal; Felipe Clemente de Velasco
- Founded: 1901
- First issue: 1 January 1901
- Final issue: December 1920
- Country: Spain
- Based in: Madrid
- Language: Spanish
- ISSN: 2171-0384
- OCLC: 733282567

La Lectura was a monthly science, literary and arts magazine which was published in Madrid, Spain, between 1901 and 1920. Its subtitle was Revista de ciencias y artes.

== History and profile ==
La Lectura was founded by the writer and journalist Francisco Acebal and academic Felipe Clemente de Velasco, and the first issue appeared in January 1901. The magazine was published in Madrid on a monthly basis. It enjoyed international readership, and covered significant articles on modern literature and art.

Julián Juderías and Alicia Pestana were among the regular contributors. La Lectura folded in December 1920.
