= Emilio Castelar =

19th-century Spanish politician

The Most Excellent Emilio Castelar
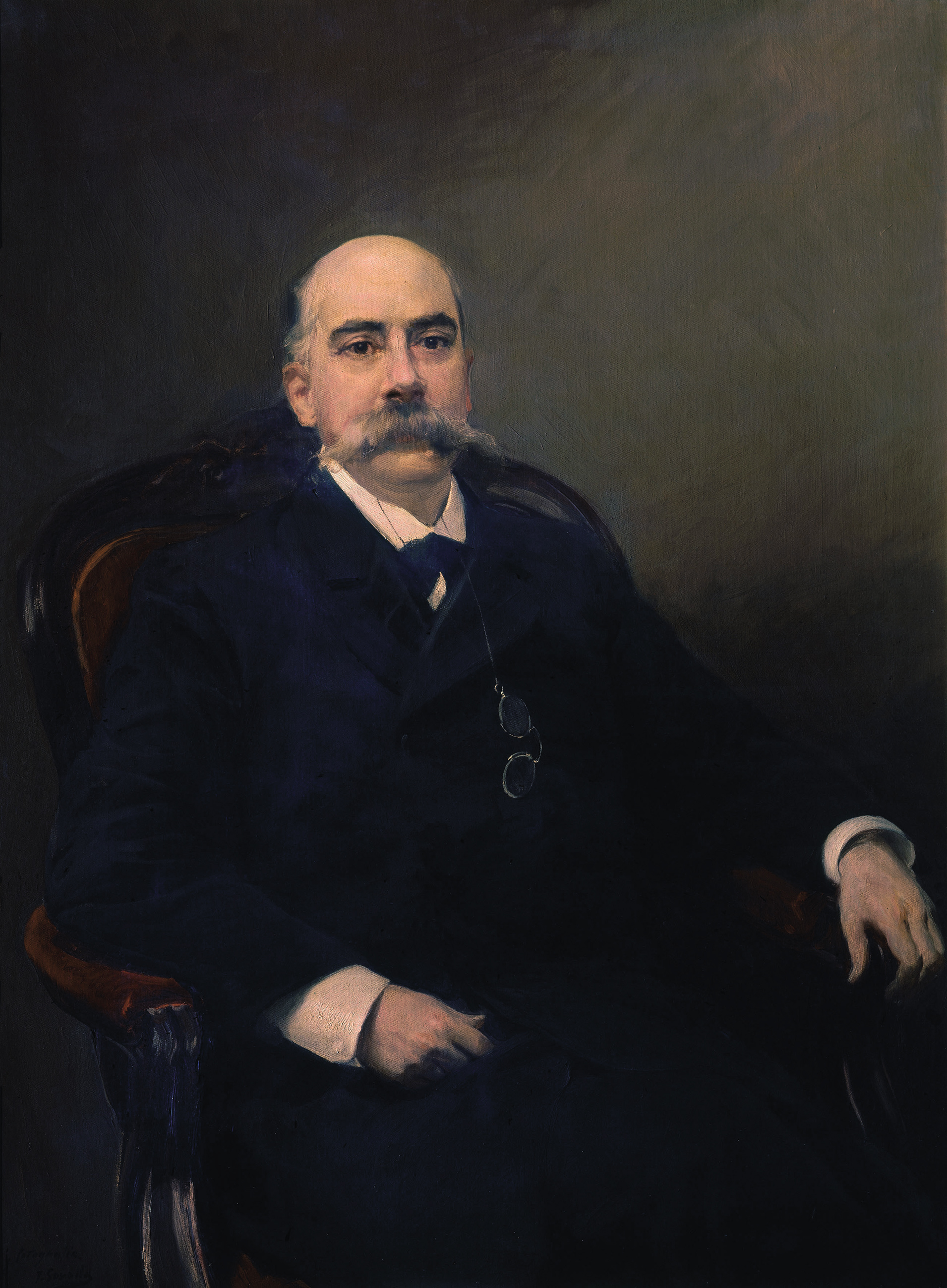
- Castelar, by Joaquín Sorolla.

President of the Executive Power of the Republic
- In office 7 September 1873 – 3 January 1874
- Preceded by: Nicolás Salmerón
- Succeeded by: Francisco Serrano

Seat D of the Real Academia Española
- In office 25 April 1880 – 25 May 1899
- Preceded by: Pedro Felipe Monlau
- Succeeded by: Jacinto Octavio Picón

Personal details
- Born: Emilio Castelar y Ripoll; 7 September 1832 Cádiz, Spain
- Died: 25 May 1899 (aged 66) San Pedro del Pinatar, Spain
- Resting place: Saint Isidore Cemetery

Emilio Castelar y Ripoll (7 September 1832 – 25 May 1899) was a Spanish republican politician, and a president of the First Spanish Republic.

Castelar was born in Cádiz. He was an eloquent orator and a writer. Appointed as Head of State in 1873 in the midst of the Third Carlist War and having been given full powers by the Parliament, he ruled by decree. He left office after a coup led by General Pavía the following year.

He wrote a history of the Republican Movement in Europe among other works of political interest.

== Early life ==
At the age of seven he lost his father, who had taken an active part in the progressive agitations during the reign of Ferdinand VII, and had spent several years as an exile in England. He attended a grammar school at Sax. In 1848 he began to study law in Madrid, but soon elected to compete for admission to the School of Philosophy and Letters, where he earned a doctorate in 1853. He was an obscure republican student during the Spanish revolutionary movement of 1854, and the young liberals and democrats of that era decided to hold a meeting in the largest theatre of the capital. On that occasion Castelar delivered his maiden speech, which at once placed him in the political vanguard of the reign of Queen Isabella II.

== Start of political life ==
From that moment on, he took an active part in politics, radical journalism, and literary and historical pursuits. Castelar was involved in the First Uprising of June 1866, which was organized by Marshal Prim, and crushed, after much bloodshed, in the streets by Marshals O'Donnell and Serrano. A court martial condemned him in contumaciam to death by garrote, and he had to hide at a friend's house until he could escape to France. There he lived two years until the successful Revolution of 1868 allowed him to return and take a seat in the Cortes for the first time as deputy for Zaragoza. At the same time he resumed the professorship of history at the Complutense University of Madrid. Castelar soon became famous for his speeches in the Constituent Cortes of 1869, where he led the republican minority in advocating a federal republic as the logical outcome of the recent revolution. He thus gave much trouble to men like Serrano, Topete and Prim, who had never cherished the idea of establishing an advanced democracy, and who each had his own scheme for re-establishing the monarchy with certain constitutional restrictions. Hence arose Castelar's constant and vigorous criticisms of the successive plans mooted to place a Hohenzollern, a Portuguese, the Duke of Montpensier, Espartero and finally Amadeus of Savoy on the throne. He attacked with relentless vigour the short-lived monarchy of Amadeus, and contributed to its downfall.

== The Federal Republic ==
Amadeus' abdication led to the proclamation of the Federal Republic. The Senate and Congress, very largely composed of monarchists, permitted themselves to be dragged along into democracy by the republican minority headed by Salmerón, Figueras, Francesc Pi i Margall, and Castelar. The short-lived federal republic from 11 February 1873 to 3 January 1874 was the culmination of the career of Castelar, and his conduct during those eleven months was much praised by the wiser part of his countrymen, though it alienated from him the sympathies of the majority of his sometime friends in the republican ranks.

Before the Revolution of 1868, Castelar had begun to dissent from the doctrines of the more advanced republicans, and particularly as to the means to be employed for their success. He abhorred bloodshed, disliked mob rule, and did not approve of military pronunciamientos. His idea would have been a parliamentary republic on American lines, with some traits of the Swiss constitution to keep in touch with the regionalist and provincialist inclinations of many parts of the Peninsula. He would have placed at the head of his commonwealth a president and Cortes freely elected by the people, ruling the country in a liberal spirit and with due respect for conservative principles, religious traditions, and national unity.

== First Federal Republic Government ==
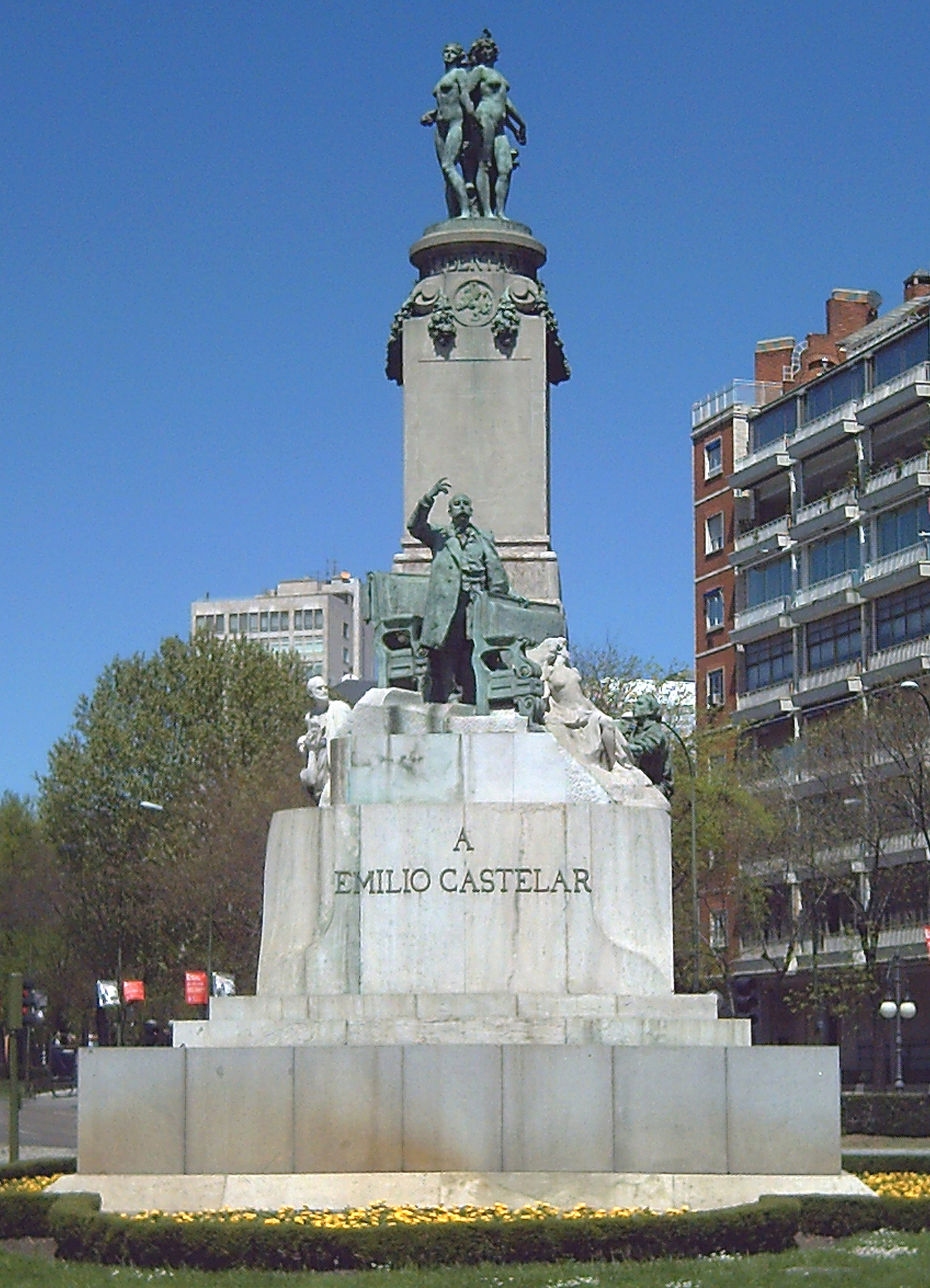
Monument to Castelar in Madrid (M. Benlliure, 1908).

At first Castelar did his best to work with the other republican members of the first government of the federal republic. He accepted the post of minister for foreign affairs. Castelar even went so far as to side with his colleagues, when serious difficulties arose between the new government and the president of the Cortes, Señor Martos, who was backed by a very imposing commission composed of the most influential conservative members of the last parliament of the Savoyard king, which had suspended its sittings shortly after proclaiming the federal republic. A sharp struggle was carried on for weeks between the executive and this commission, at first presided over by Martos, and, when he resigned, by Salmeron. In the background Serrano and many politicians and military men steadily advocated a coup d'etat in order to avert the triumph of the republicans. The adversaries of the executive were prompted by the captain-general of Madrid, Pavia, who promised the co-operation of the garrison of the capital. The president, Salmeron, and Marshal Serrano himself lacked decision at the last moment, and lost time and many opportunities by which the republican ministers profited. The federal republicans became masters of the situation in the last fortnight of April 1873, and turned the tables on their adversaries by making a peaceful bloodless pronunciamiento.

The battalions and the militia that had assembled in the bullring near Marshal Serrano's house to assist the anti-democratic movement were disarmed, and their leaders, the politicians and generals, were allowed to escape to France or Portugal. The Cortes were dissolved, and the federal and constituent Cortes of the republic convened, but they only sat during the summer of 1873, long enough to show their absolute incapacity, and to convince the executive that the safest policy was to suspend the session for several months.

This was the darkest period of the annals of the Spanish revolution of 1873–1874. Matters got to such a climax of disorder, disturbance and confusion from the highest to the lowest strata of Spanish society, that the president of the executive, Figueras, deserted his post and fled the country. Pi y Margall and Salmeron, in successive attempts to govern, found no support in the really important and influential elements of Spanish society. Salmeron had even to appeal to such well-known reactionary generals as Pavia, Sanchez, Bregna, and Moriones, to assume the command of the armies in the south and in the north of Spain. Fortunately these officers responded to the call of the executive. In less than five weeks a few thousand men properly handled sufficed to quell the cantonal risings in Cordoba, Seville, Cádiz and Málaga, and the whole of the south might have been soon pacified, if the federal republican ministers had not once more given way to the pressure of the majority of the Cortes, composed of Intransigentes and radical republicans. The president, Salmeron, after showing much indecision, resigned, but not until he had recalled the general in command in Andalusia, Pavia. This resignation was not an unfortunate event for the country, as the federal Cortes not only made Castelar chief of the executive, though his partisans were in a minority in the Parliament, but they gave him much liberty to act, as they decided to suspend the sittings of the house until 2 January 1874. This was the turning-point of the Spanish revolution, as from that day the tide set in towards the successive developments that led to the restoration of the Bourbons.

== Ruler of Spain, 1873 ==
On becoming the ruler of Spain at the beginning of September 1873, Castelar at once devoted his attention to the reorganization of the army, whose numbers had dwindled down to about 70,000 men. This force, though aided by considerable bodies of local militia and volunteers in the northern and western provinces, was insufficient to cope with the 60,000 Carlists in arms, and with the still formidable nucleus of cantonalists around Alcoy and Cartagena. To supply the deficiencies Castelar called out more than 100,000 conscripts, who joined the colors in less than six weeks. He selected his generals without respect of politics, sending Moriones to the Basque provinces and Navarre at the head of 20,000 men, Martinez Campos to Catalonia with several thousand, and Lopez Dominguez, the nephew of Marshal Serrano, to begin the land blockade of the last stronghold of the cantonal insurgents, the Canton of Cartagena, where the crews of Spain's only fleet had joined the revolt.

== Castelar and the Church ==
Castelar next turned his attention to the Church. He renewed direct relations with the Vatican, and at last induced Pope Pius IX to approve his selection of two dignitaries to occupy vacant sees as well as his nominee for the vacant archbishopric of Valencia, a prelate who afterwards became archbishop of Toledo, and remained to the end a close friend of Castelar. He put a stop to all persecutions of the Church and religious orders, and enforced respect of Church property. He attempted to restore some order in the treasury and administration of finance, with a view to obtain ways and means to cover the expense of the three civil wars, Carlist, cantonal and Cuban. The Cuban insurgents gave him much trouble and anxiety, the famous Virginius Incident nearly leading to a rupture between Spain and the United States. Castelar sent out to Cuba all the reinforcements he could spare, and a new governor-general, Jovellar, whom he peremptorily instructed to crush the mutinous spirit of the Cuban militia, and not allow them to drag Spain into a conflict with the U.S. Acting upon the instructions of Castelar, Jovellar gave up the filibuster vessels, and those of the crew and passengers who had not been summarily shot by General Burriel. Castelar always prided himself on having terminated this incident without too much damage to the prestige of Spain.

At the end of 1873 Castelar had reason to be satisfied with the results of his efforts, with the military operations in the peninsula, with the assistance he was getting from the middle classes and even from many of the political elements of the Spanish revolution that were not republican. On the other hand, on the eve of the meeting of the federal Cortes, he could indulge in no illusions as to what he had to expect from the bulk of the republicans, who openly dissented from his conservative and conciliatory policy, and announced that they would reverse it on the very day the Cortes met. Warnings came in plenty, and no less a personage than the man he had made captain-general of Madrid, General Pavia, suggested that, if a conflict arose between Castelar and the majority of the Cortes, not only the garrison of Madrid and its chief, but all the armies in the field and their generals, were disposed to stand by the president. Castelar knew too well what such offers meant in the classic land of pronunciamientos, and he refused so flatly that Pavia did not renew his advice. The Cortes met on 2 January 1874. The intransigent majority refused to listen to a last eloquent appeal that Castelar made to their patriotism and common sense, and they passed a vote of censure. Castelar resigned. The Cortes went on wrangling for a day and night until, at daybreak on 3 January 1874, General Pavia forcibly ejected the deputies, closed and dissolved the Cortes, and called up Marshal Serrano to form a provisional government.

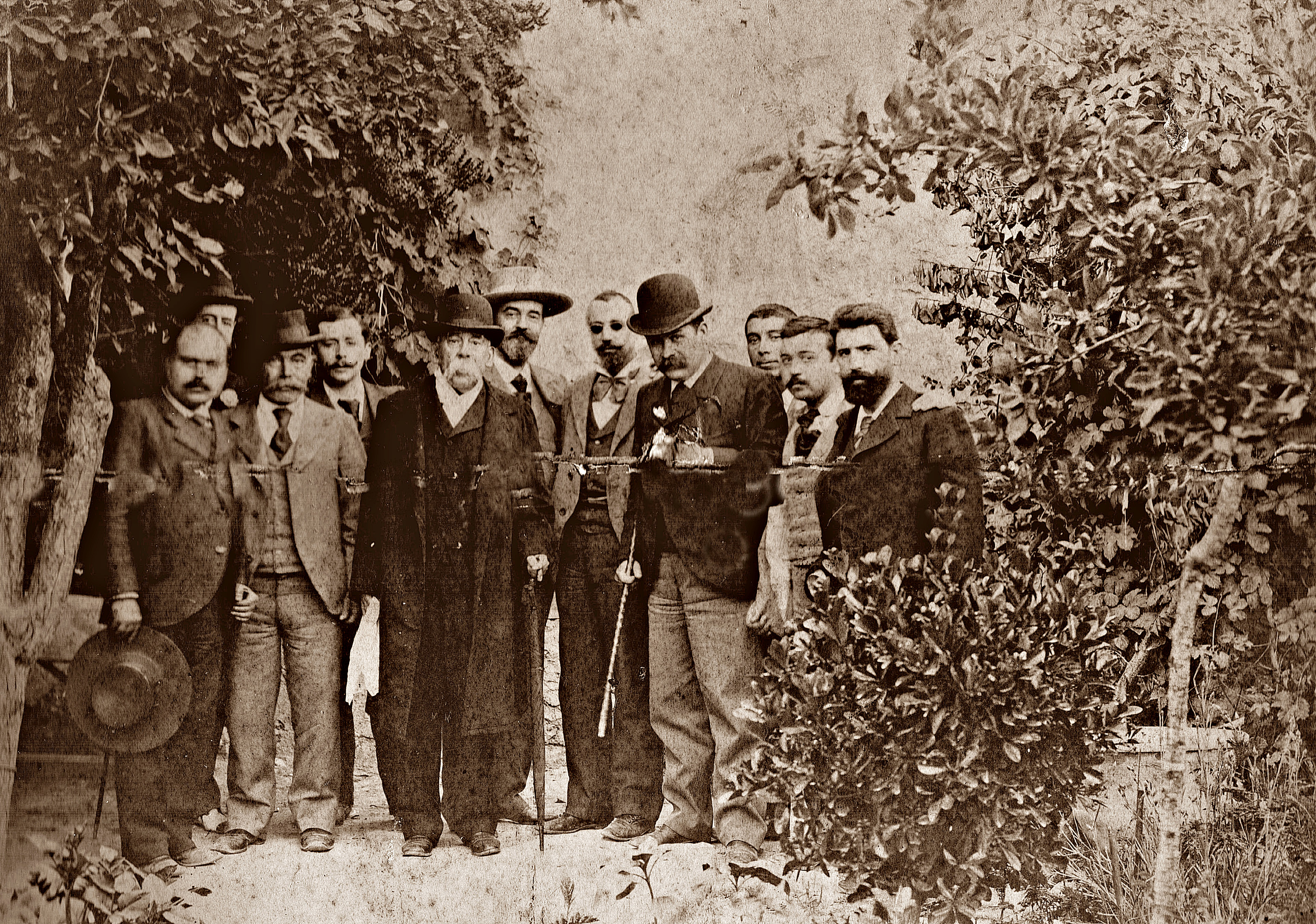
An aging Castelar, with some friends in Murcia (including Vicente Medina and José García Vaso).

Castelar kept apart from active politics during the twelve months that Serrano acted as president of the republic. Another pronunciamiento finally put an end to it in the last week of December 1874, when Generals Campos at Sagunto, Jovellar at Valencia, Primo de Rivera at Madrid, and Laserna at Logrono, proclaimed Alphonso XII king of Spain. Castelar then went into voluntary exile for fifteen months, at the end of which he was elected deputy for Barcelona. He sat in all subsequent parliaments, and just a month before his death he was elected as representative of Murcia. During that period he became even more estranged from the majority of the republicans. Bitter experience had shown him that their federal doctrines and revolutionary methods could lead to nothing in harmony with the aspirations of the majority of Spaniards. He was elected, to use his own words, "to defend and to seek the realization of the substance of the program of the Spanish revolution of 1868 by evolution, and legal, peaceful means." Hence the contrast between his attitude from 1876 to 1886, during the reign of Alphonso, when he stood in the front rank of the opposition, to defend the reforms of that revolution against Señor Canovas, and his attitude from 1886 to 1891.

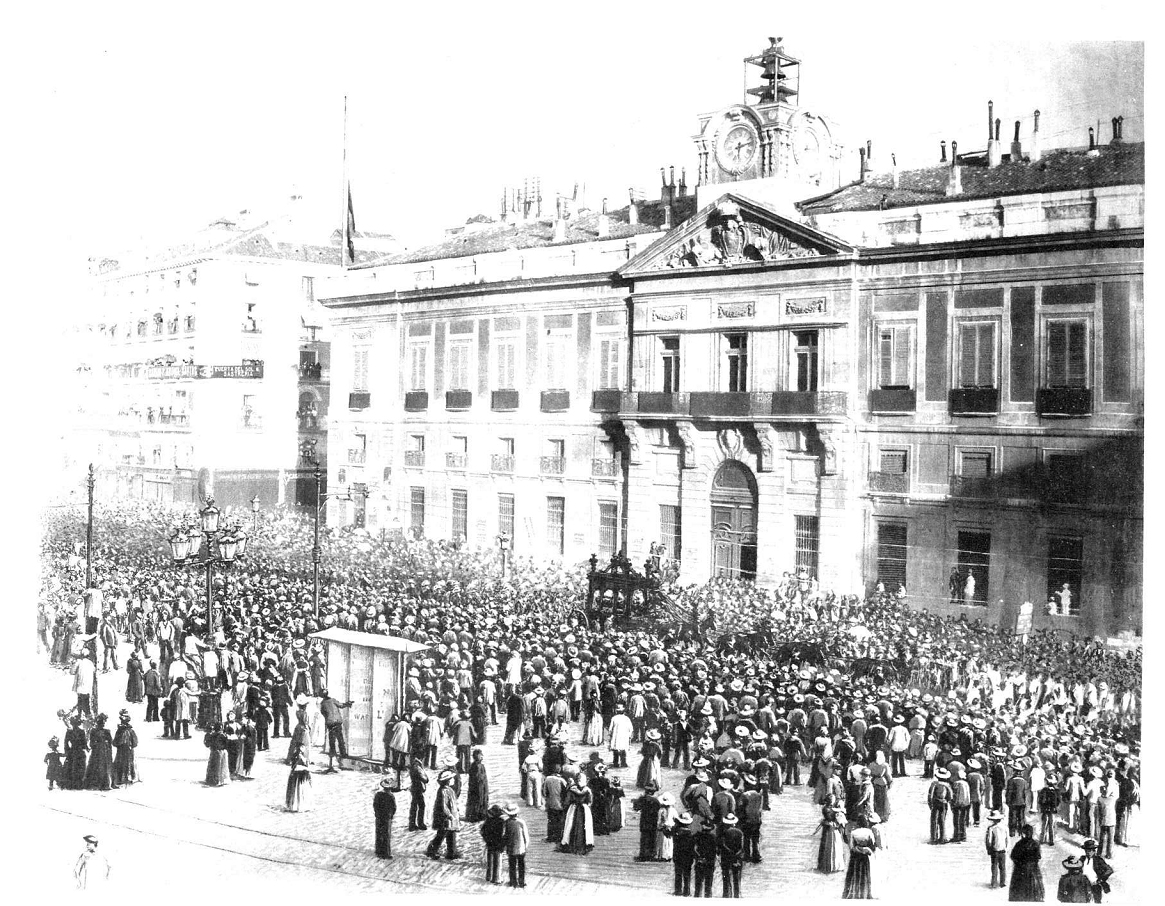
Funeral ceremony passing by the Puerta del Sol.

In this latter period Castelar acted as a sort of independent auxiliary of Sagasta and of the Liberal party. As soon as Castelar saw universal suffrage re-established he solemnly declared in the Cortes that his task was accomplished, his political mission at an end, and that he proposed to devote the remainder of his life to those literary, historical, philosophical, and economic studies which he had never neglected even in the busiest days of his political career. Indeed, it was his extraordinary activity and power of assimilation in such directions that allowed him to keep his fellow-countrymen so well informed of what was going on in the outer world.

== Work ==
His literary and journalistic labors occupied much of his time, and were his chief means of subsistence. He established a daily newspaper, El Globo, in Madrid in 1875. He left unfinished a history of Europe in the 19th century. The most conspicuous of his earlier works were: A History of Civilization in the First Five Centuries of Christianity, Recollections of Italy, Life of Lord Byron, The History of the Republican Movement in Europe, The Redemption of Slaves, The Religious Revolution, Historical Essays on the Middle Ages, The Eastern Question, Fra Filippo Lippi, History of the Discovery of America, and some historical novels. Castelar died near Murcia on 25 May 1899, at the age of sixty-six. His funeral at Madrid was an imposing demonstration of the sympathy and respect of all classes and parties.

Political offices
Preceded by Cristino Martos	Minister of State; 11 February 1873 – 11 June 1873	Succeeded by José Muro
Preceded by Nicolás Salmerón	President of the Executive Power of Spain; 7 September 1873 – 3 January 1874	Succeeded by The Duke of la Torre
Preceded by Nicolás Salmerón	President of the Provisional Government of Spain; 7 September 1873 – 4 January 1874	Succeeded by The Duke of la Torre
