= José María Fenollera =

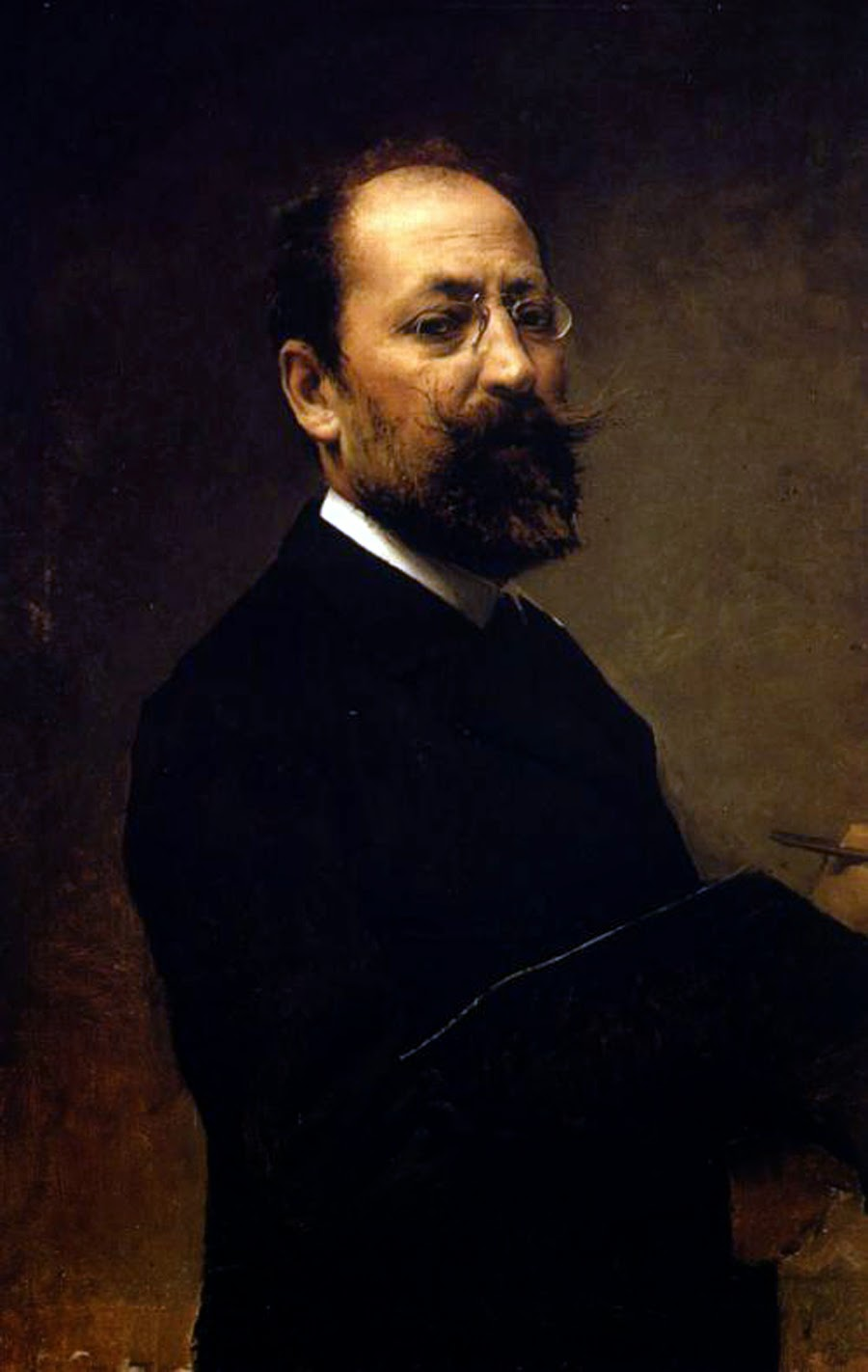
Self-portrait (c. 1900)

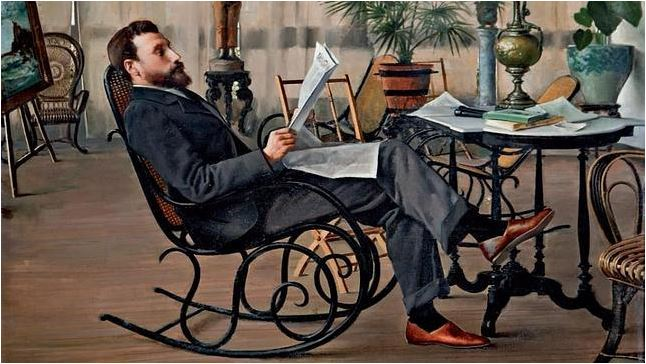
Portrait of Alfredo Brañas

José María Fenollera e Ibáñez (10 December 1851 – 6 December 1918) was a Spanish painter, known primarily for portraits.

== Life ==
He studied at the Real Academia de Bellas Artes de San Carlos. Later, thanks to a scholarship from the Diputación Provincial de Valencia, he was able to spend five years in Rome (1872-1877). After that, he travelled to Paris, where he learned the techniques of photoengraving. He eventually settled in Madrid, where he created designs for the Royal Tapestry Factory and decorated the popular Café de Fornos.

In 1887, he moved to Santiago de Compostela, where he established himself as a Professor at the School of Fine Arts and became involved in the Galician regionalist movement. He was primarily devoted to painting portraits of Galician notables; such as the writer, Alfredo Brañas, Eugenio Montero Ríos, José Carvajal y Hué and Cardinal Miguel Payá y Rico. He also did a series on the Presidents of the Sociedad Económica de los Amigos del País. Later, he created frescoes at the Universidad de Santiago de Compostela.

In 1890, he married Consuelo Velón y González-Pardo, a member of the Galician nobility.

He was awarded a gold medal, with a Diploma of Honor, at the Exposición Rexional de 1909.
