= José Muro y López-Salgado =

Spanish politician and lawyer

José Muro

José Muro y López-Salgado (21 December 1840, in Valladolid, Spain - 19 June 1907, in Madrid, Spain) was a Spanish politician and lawyer who served as Minister of State in 1873, during the presidency of Francisco Pi y Margall in the First Spanish Republic.

Political offices
Preceded by Emilio Castelar	Minister of State; 11 June 1873 – 28 June 1873	Succeeded by Eleuterio Maisonnave
