= El Globo =

Daily newspaper in Spain (1875–1932)

- Type: Daily newspaper; Weekly newspaper
- Founder: Emilio Castelar
- Founded: 25 March 1875
- Ceased publication: 31 May 1932
- Political alignment: Possibilist republicanism (early); Monarchism (after 1896)
- Language: Spanish
- Headquarters: Madrid
- Country: Spain

El Globo was a Spanish daily newspaper which was in circulation between 1875 and 1932 in Madrid, Spain. Its subtitle was diario ilustrado (Spanish: Illustrated Daily). It was among the influential publications of the period during which it existed.

== History and profile ==
El Globo was launched by Emilio Castelar, a Spanish politician, in Madrid in 1875, and its first issue appeared on 25 March 1875. Its political stance was moderate-possibilist republicanism. In 1885, another Spanish politician, Eleuterio Maisonnave, acquired the paper. The next owner was Álvaro de Figueroa, who bought El Globo in 1896, changing its political stance to liberal monarchism. The paper was sold to the Catalan deputy Emilio Ríus y Peniquet in 1902. Its last owner was Magdaleno de Castro.

El Globo published a literary supplement entitled Plana del Lunes in 1897–1898. Due to lower circulation levels, the frequency of the paper was switched from daily to twice per week in 1923. Under the ownership of Magdaleno de Castro, it was published on a weekly basis. The final issue of El Globo was published on 31 May 1932.

== Contributors and circulation ==
El Globo was directed by Joaquín Martín de Olías from 1877. Between 1890 and 1896, the paper was directed by Alfredo Vicenti Rey. Its major contributors included Francisco Navarro Ledesma, Andrés Ovejero, Baldomero Argente, Manuel Castro Tiedra and Manuel Tercero.

El Globo sold 25,000 copies in 1880. Its circulation was 8,000 copies in 1913, which dropped to 2,000 copies in 1920.
