= Cipriano Rivas Cherif =

Spanish playwright and director

Cipriano Rivas Cherif (1891–1967) was a Spanish playwright and director, owner of the Caracol Theatre Club and one of the pioneering directors of the Spanish theatrical avant-garde in the early twentieth century. He was among the contributors of the Madrid-based avant-garde magazine Prometeo published between 1908 and 1912. In 1934, he was offered the concession for the Teatro María Guerrero, a theatre in Madrid, by the Spanish government free-of-charge, making it possible for him to use it for his School of Art Theatre (Teatro Escuela de Arte).
