= Prometeo (magazine) =

Spanish avant-garde magazine (1908–1912)

- Categories: Literary magazine
- Frequency: Monthly
- Founder: Javier Gómez de la Serna
- Founded: 1908
- First issue: 1 November 1908
- Final issue: 1 March 1912
- Country: Spain
- Based in: Madrid
- Language: Spanish
- ISSN: 1576-1363
- OCLC: 733274174

Prometeo (Spanish: Prometheus) was a monthly avant-garde magazine which existed between 1908 and 1912 in Madrid, Spain. The magazine was established by the avant-garde writer Javier Gómez de la Serna. Its subtitle was revista social y literaria (Spanish: Social and literary magazine).

== History and profile ==
Prometeo was launched by Javier Gómez de la Serna in Madrid on 1 November 1908. It came out monthly. Javier Gómez edited the political section of the magazine until issue 11 dated September 1909 when he was appointed general director registries and notaries. Then his son Ramón Gómez de la Serna took charge of the magazine. He also published articles in the magazine. Its major contributors were as follows: Rafael Cansinos-Asséns, Enrique Díez Canedo, Carlos Fernández Shaw, Juan Ramón Jiménez, Gabriel Miró, Cipriano Rivas Cherif, Emilio Carrere and Francisco Villaespesa. The writings of the Italian poet Filippo Tommaso Marinetti were also featured in the magazine.

In April 1909 Prometeo published the Spanish translation of the manifesto of futurism written by Filippo Tommaso Marinetti. The text was translated into Spanish by Ramón Gómez. Therefore, it endorsed this new approach which laid the basis of the avant-garde movement. It was the first Spanish periodical which published Spanish translations of the poems by Walt Whitman. The magazine also featured translations of the work by Oscar Wilde, Thomas De Quincey, Anatole France, Maxim Gorky and George Bernard Shaw. The final issue of Prometeo appeared on 1 March 1912.
