= Eleuterio Maisonnave y Cutayar =

Spanish politician

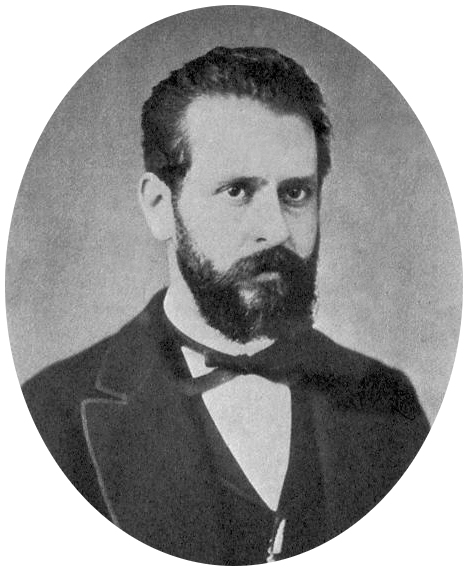
Eleuterio Maisonnave

Eleuterio Maisonnave y Cutayar (6 September 1840 in Alicante, Spain – 5 May 1890 in Madrid, Spain) was a Spanish politician who served as minister of state in 1873 during the presidency of Francisco Pi y Margall in the First Spanish Republic. In 1885 he bought a daily newspaper, El Globo, based in Madrid.

Political offices
Preceded by José Muro	Minister of State; 28 June 1873 – 18 July 1873	Succeeded by Santiago Soler
