= Baldomero Argente =

Spanish politician (1877–1965)

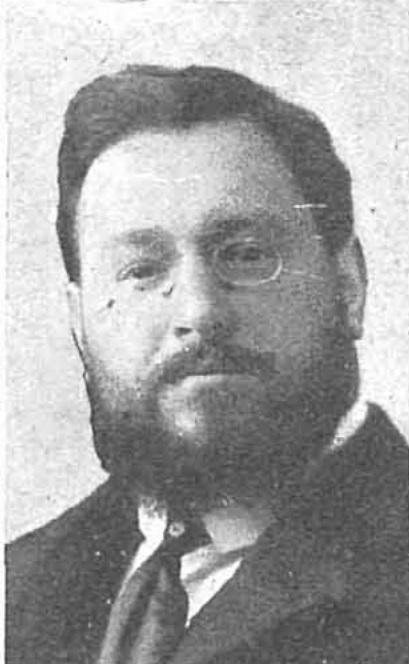

Minister of Supply
- In office December 1918 – February 1919
- Preceded by: Pablo Garnica
- Succeeded by: Leonardo Rodríguez Díaz

Personal details
- Born: 6 February 1877 Province of Granada, Spain
- Died: 28 September 1965 (aged 88) Madrid, Spain
- Party: Liberal Party (romanonista)
- Occupation: Journalist, politician, economist, sociologist, lawyer, writer

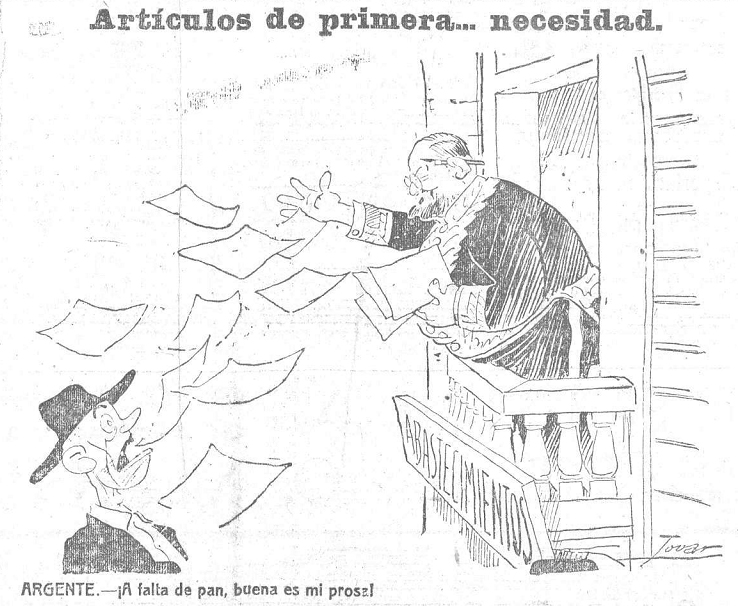
Political cartoon by Tovar depicting Argente in 1919 as Minister of Supply throwing paper sheets, "In the absence of bread, good is my prose".

Baldomero Argente del Castillo (1877–1965) was a Spanish politician, sociologist, lawyer, economist, writer and journalist. He was a disseminator of the ideas of georgism in Spain. A member of the Liberal Party, he briefly served as Minister of Supply from 1918 to 1919.

== Biography ==
Born on 6 February 1877 in the province of Granada (sources report as birthplace either Jerez del Marquesado or "Granada"), he was the natural son of a priest, and was raised by his aunt.

He took baccalaureate studies in Granada. He began university studies in law in Valencia, ending them in Manila, earning the licentiate degree in 1896. He served as lecturer in mechanics at a school in the Philippines. He also worked as lead writer for the Diario de Manila and as editor of El Porvenir de Bisayas. He served as volunteer in a cavalry regiment, fighting against the insurgent tagalos. Following the loss of the Philippines at the 1898 Spanish–American War, Argente returned to Mainland Spain by mid 1899.

José Francos Rodríguez appointed him as ed-in-chief of El Globo. He took an interest in the reading of books on Economy, Administration and Sociology, becoming an adept of the theories of Henry George. Translator of the American economist's works, Argente had a central role in the dissemination of the ideas of georgism in Spain.

Argente opened a law firm in Madrid, and was appointed as substitute prosecutor of the Audiencia of Madrid. He did not stop writing books and collaborating in newspapers, such as Diario Universal, Heraldo de Madrid, and El Imparcial, as well as magazines, such as Nuevo Mundo.

He was elected member of the Congress of Deputies in representation of Alcaraz (Albacete) at the 1910 election. He was elected as Madrid municipal councillor at the 1911 municipal election and was appointed as deputy major in 1912. He earned a parliamentary seat in representation of Las Palmas at the 1914, 1916, 1918, 1919, (Note: Although, as he was elected also in representation of Fregenal de la Sierra in 1919, he was chosen to remain exclusively as representative of that district after a draw.) 1920 and 1923 elections, and as representative of Fregenal de la Sierra (Badajoz) at the 1919 election.

A follower of the Count of Romanones, he was appointed as Minister of Supply in December 1918, only to leave the portfolio in February 1919.

He became a member of the executive board of the Asociación Española Pro Sociedad de Naciones (AEPSDN), established in April 1920 (repeating as member in the new board appointed in January 1929).

He took office as member of the Royal Academy of Moral and Political Sciences on 1 June 1924, reading La Reforma Agraria, a discourse replied by Eduardo Sanz Escartín.

During the dictatorship of Primo de Rivera, Argente served as member of the National Assembly and the Council of State.

He died on 28 September 1965, in Madrid.
