= Topete =

Topete is a Portuguese and Spanish surname, which derives from the Portuguese topete, meaning "quiff" and "cockscomb". The name may refer to:

- Juan Bautista Topete (1821–1885), Spanish admiral and politician
- Pascual Cervera y Topete (1839–1909), Spanish admiral
