= Francisco Villaespesa =

Spanish writer

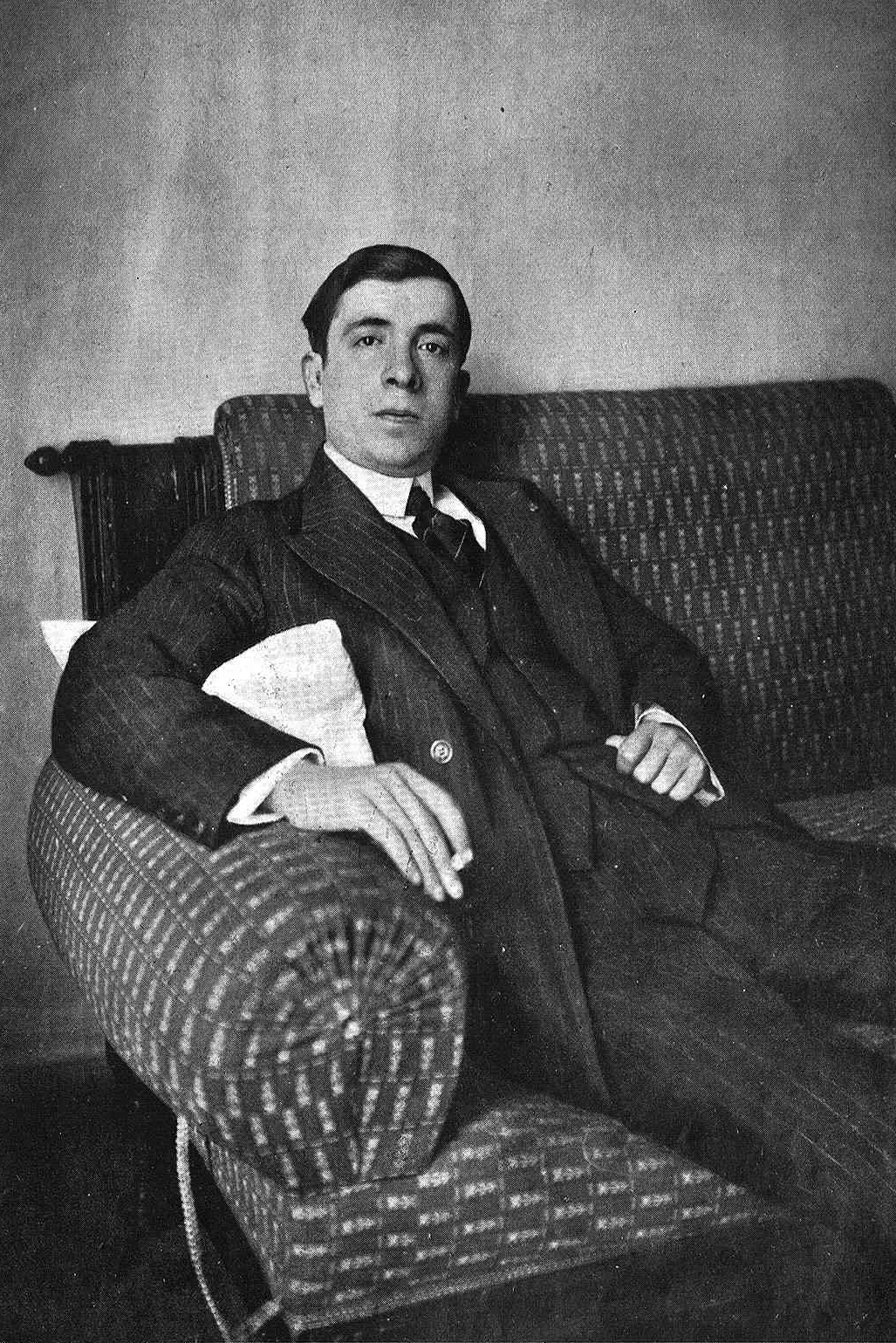
Francisco Villaespesa Martín

Francisco Villaespesa Martín (14 October 1877–9 April 1936) was a Spanish writer. He was born in Láujar de Andarax, Province of Almería, which marked him all his life. He is probably the most notable writer of the province, thus, both the capital and his hometowns libraries have his name.

He has an extent poetry work, with more than 50 books of poetry published and some unpublished.

His first works (Intimidades (1898) and Luchas (1899)) are romantic. At the beginning of the 20th century he joined the Modernism with La copa del Rey Thule (1900). From 1906 on an orientalist note arose in his works. He was among the contributors of the Madrid-based avant-garde magazine Prometeo published between 1908 and 1912.

He died in Madrid, Spain.
