= Heraldo de Madrid =

Spanish newspaper

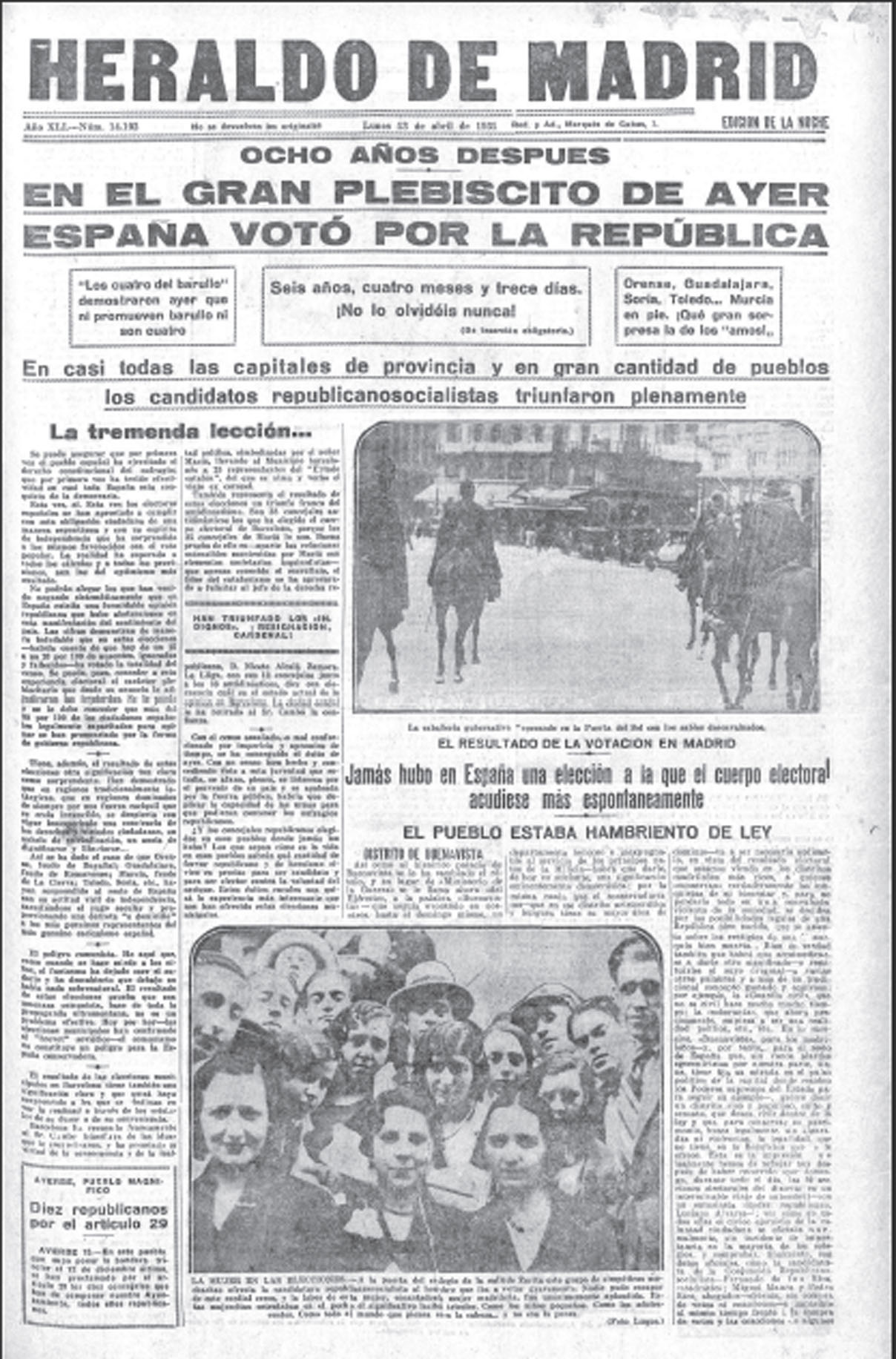
- Type: Daily newspaper
- Founder: Felipe Ducazcal
- Founded: 29 October 1890
- Ceased publication: 27 March 1939
- Political alignment: Liberalism (earlier); Republicanism (since 1927)
- Language: Spanish
- Headquarters: Madrid
- Country: Spain

The Heraldo de Madrid (originally El Heraldo de Madrid) was a Spanish daily newspaper published from 1890 to 1939, with an evening circulation. It came to espouse a Republican leaning in its later spell.

== History ==
The publication was founded on 29 October 1890 by Felipe Ducazcal Lasheras, a former close acquaintance of Amadeo I. Following the death of Ducazcal in 1891, the publicacion was bought by Eugenio González Sangrador. In 1893, the newspaper was bought by the Canalejas brothers, José and Luis, and a number of political supporters of the former. Since then, it would grow to become a major publication, as well as the mouthpiece of the Democratic Liberal political platform of José Canalejas.

By the early 1910s, following the 1906 acquisition of the newspaper by the Sociedad Editorial de España (the so-called "Trust"), the Heraldo came to adhere to the political platform of Segismundo Moret, rival of Canalejas (then prime minister) within the Liberal party.

Owned by the Busquets brothers (Manuel and Juan, holders of the Sociedad Editorial Universal since 1918), Manuel Fontdevila was hired in 1927 as editor. The Heraldo de Madrid would embrace a Republican profile from then on. A very popular newspaper among the Madrilenians, it endured difficulties during the dictatorship of Primo de Rivera. However, the members of its editorial board were elected to the Parliament in 1931.

Already started the Spanish Civil War, rebel general Juan Yagüe had already announced a grim fate for the daily in September 1936 after the rebels seized Talavera de la Reina: "Cuando entremos en Madrid lo primero que voy a hacer es cortarle la cabeza al director del Heraldo de Madrid" ("When we enter Madrid the first thing I'm going to do is cut off the head of the director of the Heraldo de Madrid").

However the Francoists did not enter the city in 1936, and the daily, whose direction was assumed by Federico Morena by 1937, endured more than two years with a reduced staff. The last issue of the newspaper was published on 27 March 1939. Seized by Falangists following the entry of the Francoist army in Madrid on the next day, the premises of the newspaper (located at the calle del Marqués de Cubas) were to be occupied by Madrid, edited by Juan Pujol, who had been chief of press of the Francoist junta during the conflict.

== Editors ==
- Augusto Suárez de Figueroa (1890–1893)
- José Gutiérrez Abascal, "Kasabal" (1893–1902)
- José Francos Rodríguez (1902–1906)
- Baldomero Argente (1906–1909)
- José Rocamora (1909–1926)
- Manuel Fontdevila (1927–1936)
- Alfredo Cabanillas Blanco (1936–1937)
- Federico de la Morena (1937–1939)

== Collaborators ==
The staff of the newspaper included standout writers and correspondents such as José Echegaray, Ramiro de Maeztu, Carmen de Burgos ("Colombine"), Ramón del Valle-Inclán, Isabel Oyarzábal or Manuel Chaves Nogales, to name a few.
