= Julián Juderías =

Spanish historian and sociologist (1877–1918)

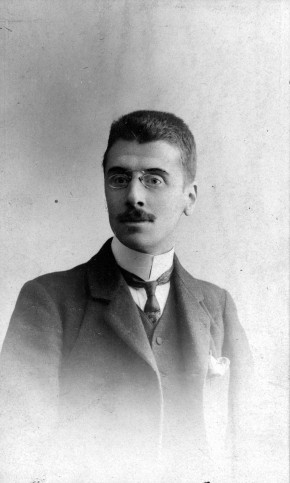
Julián Juderías, ca. 1905

Julián Juderías y Loyot (16 September 1877 – 19 June 1918) was a Spanish historian, sociologist, literary critic, journalist, translator and interpreter.

== Biography ==
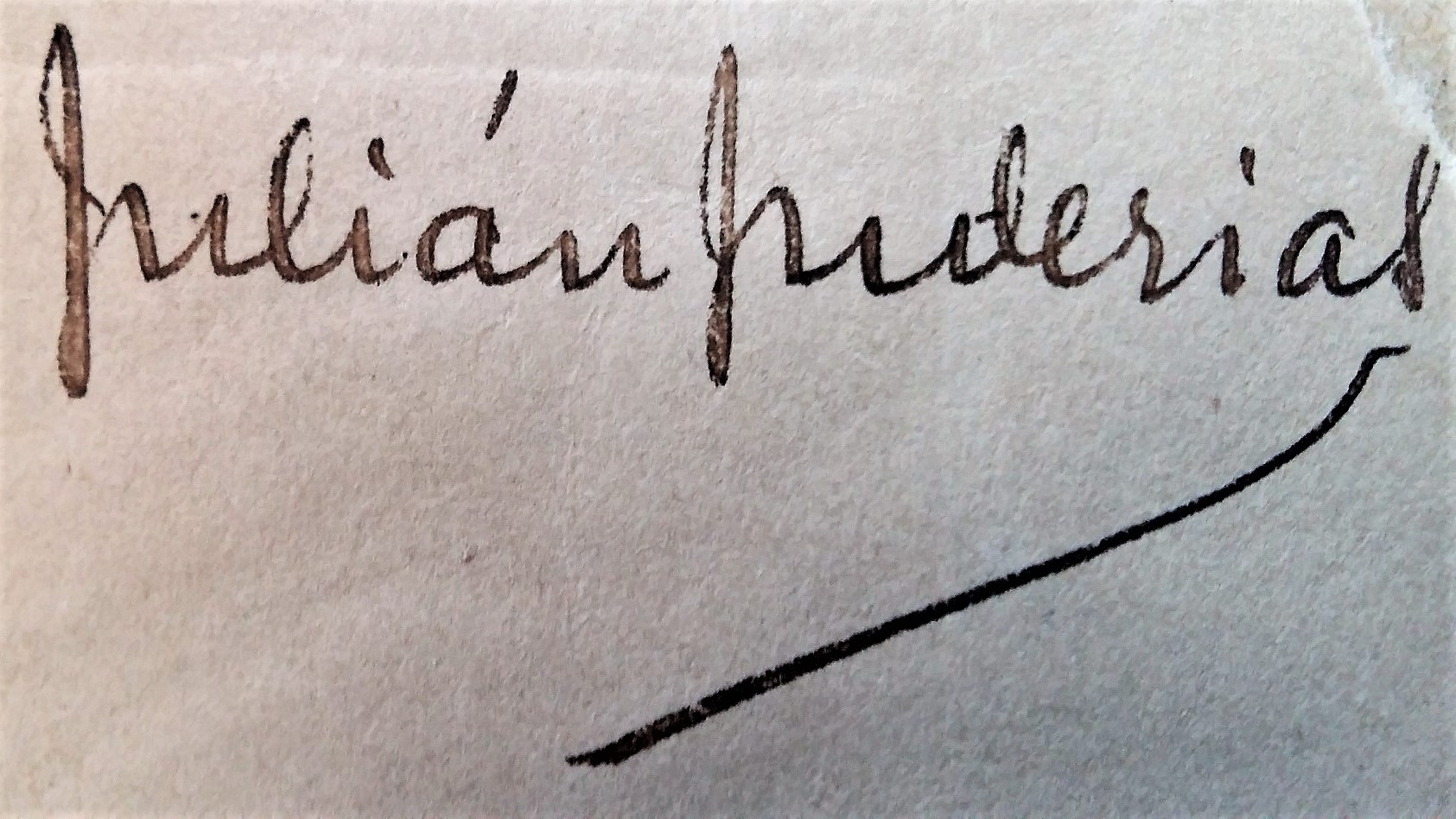
Signature of Julian Juderías

Juderías was born in Madrid to a prominent and cultured family. His father, Mariano Juderías, was a well-known historical author and translator. His mother was French. At 17, he began work with the Spanish Ministry of State. In 1900, after the death of his father, he moved to Paris to attend the School of Eastern Languages. There and in Leipzig and Odesa he studied French, German, Russian and other languages.

Juderías is best known for his work on the Black Legend concept, in which he denounced historical writing about Spain as tendentious and nonobjective.

During the First World War, he served in King Alfonso XIII's European War Office.

Years after his death, Juderías' works greatly influenced Spanish conservative thinkers such as Ramiro de Maeztu and José María de Areilza.

== Bibliography ==
=== History ===
- Un proceso político en tiempos de Felipe III: don Rodrigo Calderón, marqués de Siete Iglesias; su vida, su proceso y su muerte, Madrid, Tip. de la Rev. de Archivos, 1906.
- Los favoritos de Felipe III: don Pedro Franqueza, conde de Villalonga y Secretario de Estado, Madrid, Imprenta de la Revista de Archivos, 1909
- España en tiempos de Carlos II el Hechizado: obra que obtuvo el Premio Charro Hidalgo en el concurso abierto por el Ateneo de Madrid en 1908-1910, Madrid, Tip. de la Revista de Archivos, 1912
- Don Gaspar Melchor de Jovellanos: su vida, su tiempo, sus obras, su influencia social: obra premiada por la Real Academia de Ciencias Morales y Políticas, Madrid, Imp. de J. Ratés, 1913
- "La leyenda negra y la verdad histórica: España en Europa, trabajo premiado por La Ilustración Española y Americana en el concurso de 1913", La Ilustración Española y Americana, Madrid, enero-febrero de 1914
- La leyenda negra y la verdad histórica: contribución al estudio del concepto de España en Europa, de las causas de este concepto y de la tolerancia política y religiosa en los países civilizados, Madrid, Tip. de la Revista de Archivos, 1914
- Gibraltar: apuntes para la historia de la pérdida de esta plaza, de los sitios que le pusieron los españoles y de las negociaciones entre España e Inglaterra referentes a su restitución:1704-1796, Madrid, Tip. de la Rev. de Archivos, 1915
- La leyenda negra: estudios acerca del concepto de España en el Extranjero: segunda edición completamente refundida, aumentada y provista de nuevas indicaciones bibliográficas, Barcelona, Araluce, 1917
- La reconstrucción de la historia de España desde el punto de vista nacional: discursos leídos ante la Real Academia de la Historia en el acto de su recepción pública por el Excmo. Sr. don Julián Juderías y Loyot y por el Excmo. Sr. don Jerónimo Bécker y González, académico de número, el día 28 de abril de 1918, Madrid, Imprenta Clásica Española, 1918
- Don Francisco de Quevedo y Villegas: la época, el hombre, las doctrinas: obra premiada con accésit por la Real Academia de Ciencias Morales y Políticas en el concurso ordinario de 1917, Madrid, Establecimiento Tipográfico de Jaime Ratés, 1923

=== Sociology ===
- El obrero y la ley obrera en Rusia, Madrid, Ministerio de Estado, 1903, Madrid, Ministerio de Estado, 1903, published in Gaceta de Madrid (24 June 1903), pp. 1194–1201.
- La miseria y la criminalidad en las grandes ciudades de Europa y América, Madrid, Imp. de Arias, 1906
- La protección a la infancia en el Extranjero, Madrid, Imp. de Arias. 1908
- Los hombres inferiores: estudio acerca del pauperismo en los grandes centros de población, Madrid, 1909, vol. VII de la Biblioteca de Ciencias Penales
- La reglamentación de la prostitución y la trata de blancas, Madrid,1909
- Le Patronage Royal pour la repression de la traite des blanches et le Congrès de la Fédération Abolitioniste Internationale (Genève septembre 1908), Madrid, Suc. de Minuesa de los Ríos, 1908
- El problema de la mendicidad: medios prácticos de resolverlo, memoria que obtuvo el Premio del Ministro de la Gobernación en el concurso abierto en 1908 por la Sociedad Española de Higiene, Madrid, 1909
- Le petit crédit urbain et rural en Espagne, Bruxelles, Comité International de l’Association pour l’étude des problèmes des classes moyennes, 1909
- El problema del abolicionismo, memoria presentada al Congreso de la Asociación Española para el progreso de las Ciencias celebrado en Valencia, Madrid, 1909
- Los tribunales para niños: medios de implantarlos en España, ponencia presentada al Consejo Superior de Protección a la Infancia y publicada por éste, Madrid, 1910
- La trata de blancas: estudio de este problema en España y en el Extranjero, memoria premiada por la Sociedad Española de Higiene en el concurso de 1910, Madrid, 1911
- La higiene y su influencia en la legislación, memoria premiada por la Sociedad Española de Higiene en su concurso de 1911, Madrid, 1911
- La infancia abandonada: leyes e instituciones protectoras, memoria premiada por la Real Academia de Ciencias Morales y Políticas en el consurso de la fundación del señor d. José Santa María de Hita, Madrid, Imp. de J. Ratés, 1912
- La juventud delincuente: leyes e instituciones que tienden a su regeneración, memoria premiada por la Real Academia de Ciencias Morales y Políticas, Madrid, Imp. de J. Ratés, 1912
- Recueil des lois et ordonnances en vigueur pour la répression de la traite des blanches dans les principaux pays d’Europe et d’Amérique: fait au nom du Patronage Royal Espagnol pour la Repression de la Traite des Blanches, Madrid, Imp. Suc. de M. Minuesa de los Ríos, 1913
- Mendicidad y vagancia, ponencia para la Asamblea Nacional de Protección a la Infancia y represión de la mendicidad, 13-18 de abril de 1914; sección 3ª, Madrid, Imp. del Asilo de Huérfanos, 1914
- El problema de la infancia obrera en España, publicación de la Sección Española de la Asociación Internacional para la Protección Legal de los Trabajadores, Madrid, 1917
- Problemas de la infancia delincuente: la criminalidad, el tribunal, el reformatorio, Biblioteca “Pro-Infantia”, Madrid, 1917.

=== Politics ===
- Rusia contemporánea: estudios acerca de su situación actual, Madrid, Imp. de Fortanet, 1904
