= Moderantism =

One of the main currents of Spanish liberalism in the 19th century

Moderantism was, together with Progressivism, one of the two main currents of 19th century Spanish liberalism. It had its origins in the so-called moderates during the Liberal Triennium, who during the reign of Isabella II formed a party, the Moderate Party, which was the party that remained in power the longest and managed to integrate the "reformist" absolutists into its ranks. The less conservative sector of the Moderate Party formed the Liberal Union in 1854. During the Restoration, the members of the Moderate Party joined Antonio Cánovas del Castillo's Liberal-Conservative Party.

Their European points of reference were French doctrinairianism and British conservatism. Their adversary in Spanish public life was progressive liberalism, although both constituted the only part of the political spectrum institutionally accepted for the political game, the so-called dynastic parties.

== Origin ==
Moderantism, although its origins can be traced back to the Spanish War of Independence, in the position of the Jovellanistas (through Jovellanos), intermediate between absolutists and liberals in the debates at the Cortes de Cádiz, did not become explicit as a political movement until the Liberal Triennium (in which the moderates opposed the exalted). Even then it did not take shape in its definitive form. This took place in the last years of the reign of Ferdinand VII, when the Elizabethan group within the court, around the future regent María Cristina de Borbón, tried to attract the most moderate among the liberals (Francisco Martínez de la Rosa), obtaining an amnesty to allow their return from exile (1832, first restricted and then extended in 1833) to support the succession of the king's only daughter, Isabella. The Carlist group, clearly absolutist, supported the application of the Salic Law, which provided for the succession of the king's younger brother, Charles. The evidence of the need for mutual support between the moderate liberals and the Elizabethan aristocracy made it possible to find a possible expression of the common ideology, far removed from any extremism. Among his adversaries, this exchange of favours, conciliation or convergence of interests around an equidistant position was called pasteleo, a term popularised to such an extent that it became an offensive synonym for Moderantism itself, and the moderates were called pasteleros; while Martínez de la Rosa was nicknamed Rosita la pastelera and Barón del bello rosal (Baron of the beautiful rosebush).

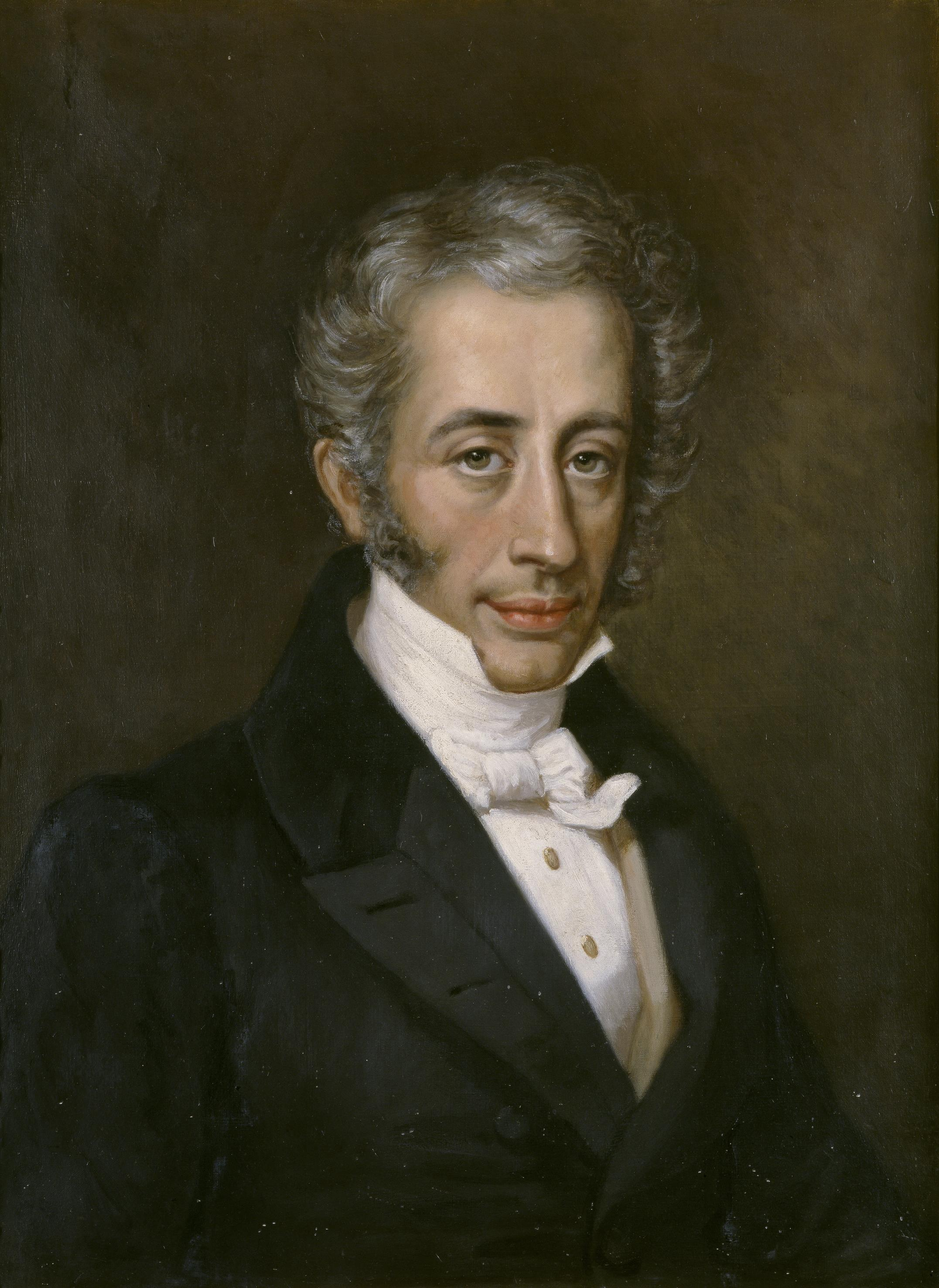
Francisco Martínez de la Rosa

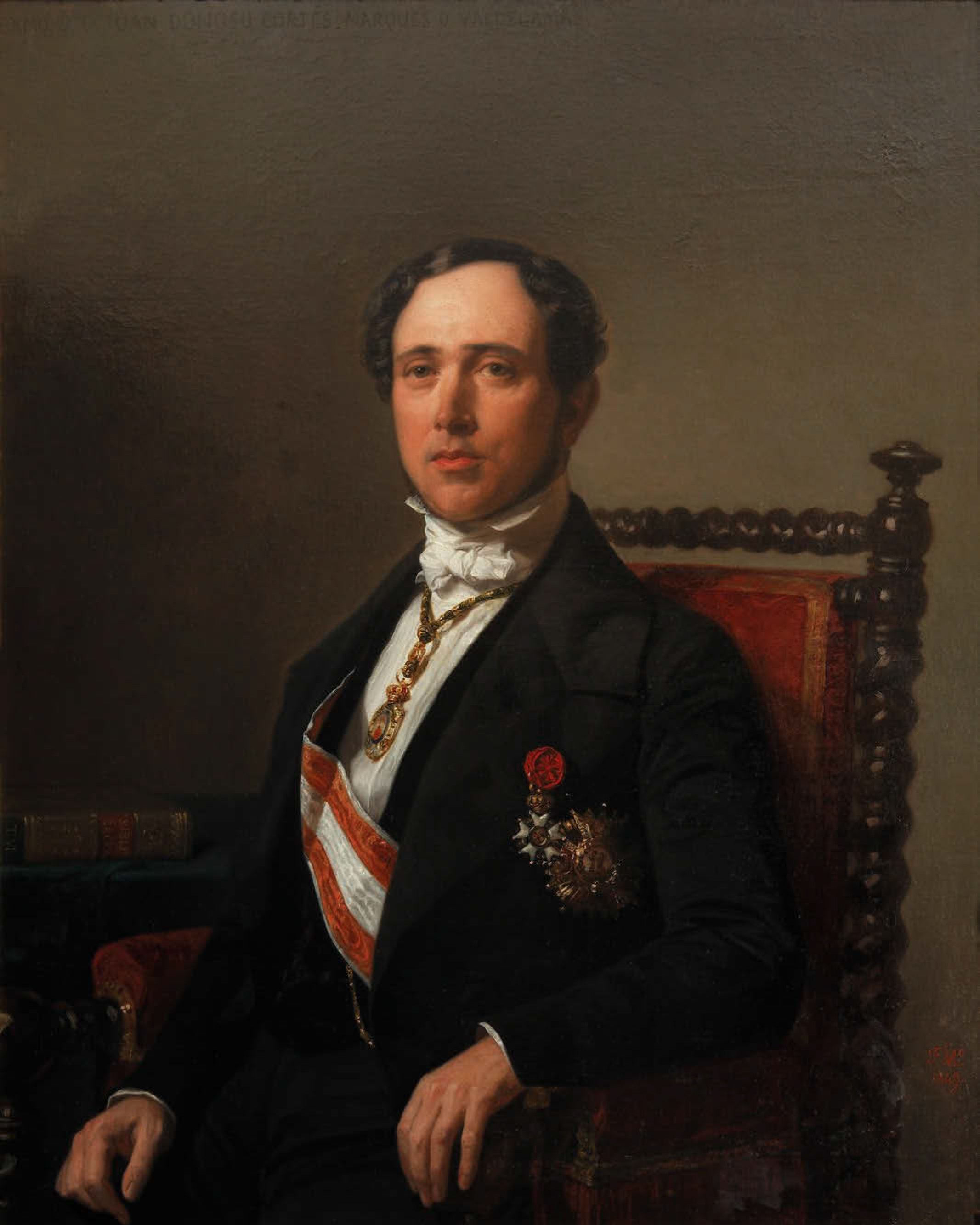
Donoso Cortés

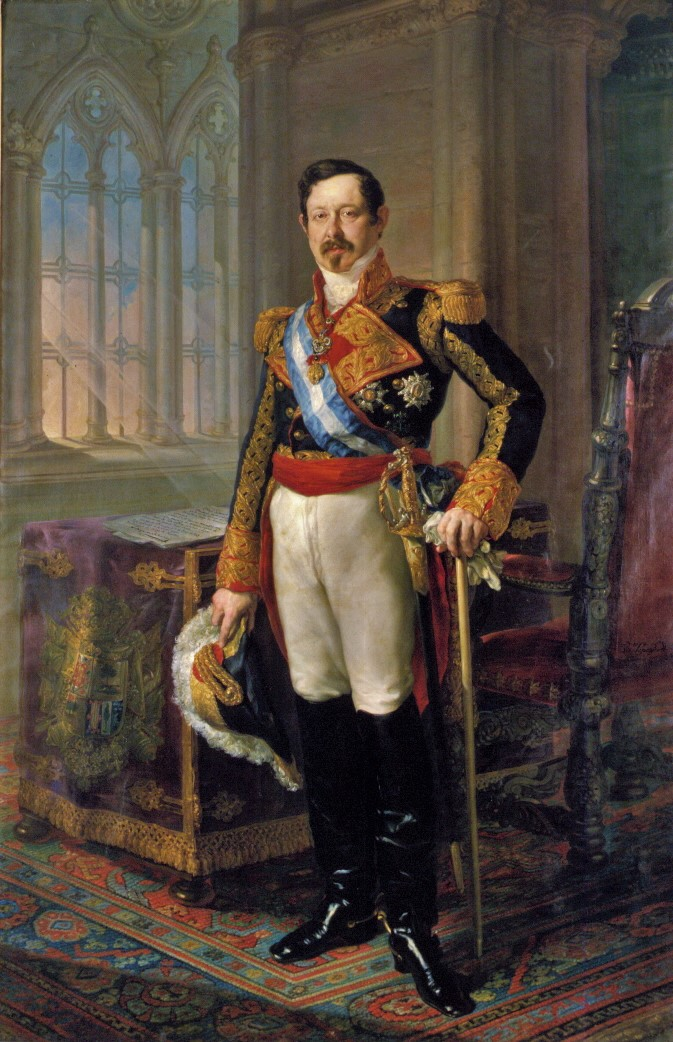
Ramón María Narváez

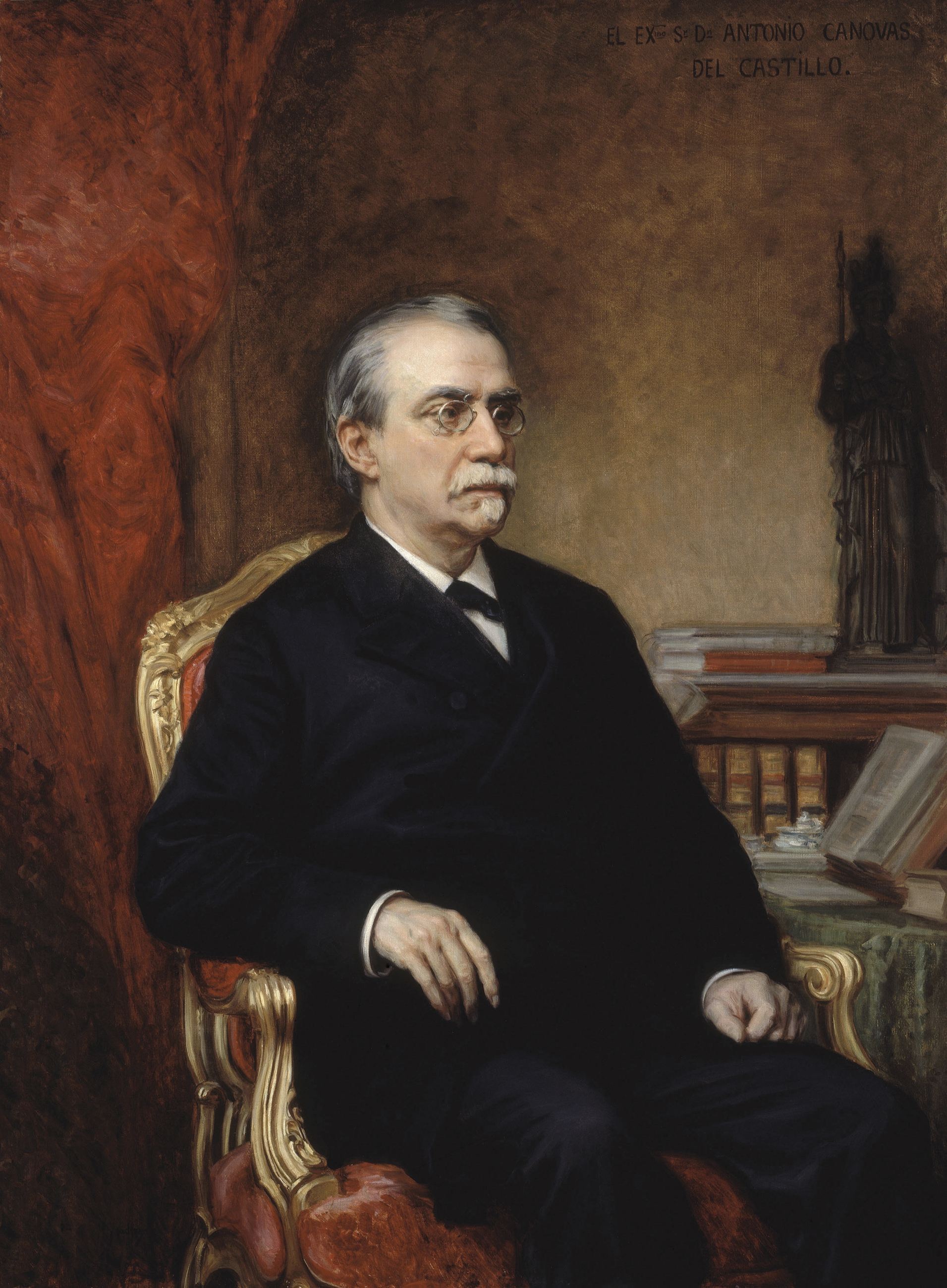
Antonio Cánovas del Castillo

== Political agenda ==
Having become a true political party of elites with a presence in the provinces and an effective propaganda apparatus, they won the elections of 1834. The founders of the party at that time have been described as the best generation of conservative liberals of the Spanish 18th century: Antonio Alcalá Galiano, Francisco Javier de Istúriz, Andrés Borrego, Antonio de los Ríos Rosas, Martínez de la Rosa, Joaquín Francisco Pacheco and Nicomedes Pastor Díaz.

The moderates remained in power for much of the reign of Isabel II (moderate decade, 1844–1854, and the period 1856–1868), resorting to military pronunciamientos when necessary, led by their chief swordsman, Narváez. From the government they had the opportunity to develop the programmatic principles of Moderantism, identified with the Constitution of 1845, which maintained a balance of power between king and parliament that was much more favourable to the monarch than the Constitution of 1812 and even the Constitution of 1837. A small group of moderates in favour of continuing with this document (on the grounds that it benefited consensus and political stability) was contemptuously accused of puritanical prejudices by Narváez, who ignored them, and from then on they became known as Puritans or Puritan dissidents; led by Joaquín Francisco Pacheco and Pastor Díaz, they had personalities such as Istúriz, José de Salamanca, Patricio de la Escosura and Claudio Moyano, and the support of Generals Manuel Gutiérrez de la Concha and Ros de Olano, and they would end up joining the most moderate of the progressives in the strategies of the Liberal Union led by General Leopoldo O'Donnell.

A strong restriction of suffrage was forced by economic criteria, reserving it for the wealthiest; and a policy of public order was promoted, entrusted to a newly created body, the Civil Guard. Moderantism was markedly centralist, reducing the municipal powers that the progressives sought to expand; and it maintained an economic policy favourable to the interests of the Castilian-Andalusian landowning oligarchy (depending on the circumstances, between protectionism and free trade), which in fiscal matters translated into a greater indirect tax burden (consumption, paid by all) than direct (contributions, paid in relation to wealth). The tax reform of 1845, carried out by Alejandro Mon y Menéndez and Ramón de Santillán, perpetuated this fiscal system.

Conservative in social and religious matters, the Spanish moderates did not seek the separation of Church and State, but rather a redirection of the anticlerical policy of the progressive liberals, which took shape in the Concordat of 1851. The Spanish Catholic Church continued to enjoy a preponderant role in public life, respecting its privileged position in education and guaranteeing its economic survival after having been deprived of its sources of wealth with the confiscation. By means of the cult and clergy budget, the State was obliged to pay the salaries of priests and bishops and to maintain the immense real estate patrimony that still remained under its control. Ideologically, the so-called neo-Catholics represented the right wing of Moderantism, seeking a difficult balance between Catholicism and liberalism, which for their opponents was a simple masking of traditionalist, ultramontane or reactionary positions.

== Canovism ==
During the revolutionary six-year period the moderates only obtained a marginal parliamentary representation, but the role of Cánovas del Castillo was decisive for the return of Alfonso XII as king, reorganizing that political space in what during the Restoration would be called the Liberal-Conservative Party, which would take turns in power with the Fusionist Liberal Party of Sagasta. The Constitution of 1876 would include a good part of the moderate political ideology, which from then on would be known as conservative or Canovist.

== Moderados ==
The centrist nature of Moderantism meant that, in addition to the moderates who were so from the beginning of their political or intellectual careers, some of the most outstanding personalities in this political and ideological sphere came from the ranks of their political adversaries. Some followed a political path to the right, coming from the exalted liberalism or from the different progressive groups; others, a path to the left, arriving at Moderantism coming from Carlism.

In addition to those mentioned above, the following can be mentioned:

- The long-time Agustín Argüelles, Conde de Toreno and Diego Muñoz-Torrero (who were liberals in the Cortes de Cádiz and moderates since the Trienio -see also "anilleros"-).
- Nicolás María Garelli, important jurist.
- Javier de Burgos (designed the provincial division still in force).
- Felipe Sierra Pambley, Minister of Finance.
- Jacinto de Romarate.
- Pedro Agustín Girón.
- Diego Medrano y Treviño.
- Narciso Heredia y Begines de los Ríos.
- Bernardino Fernández de Velasco.
- Pedro Egaña.
- Patricio de la Escosura (went from the Moderate Party to the Progressive Party and later to the Liberal Union).
- Juan Bravo Murillo.
- Francisco Javier Girón.
- Diego de León (military man opposed to Espartero, he was shot after failing in a pronunciamiento).
- Cándido Nocedal (evolved towards neo-Catholic positions and approached Carlism).
- Manuel Gutiérrez de la Concha.
- Juan Álvarez de Lorenzana y Guerrero.
- José de Posada Herrera.
- Claudio Moyano (initially progressive, he criticized the confiscation of Madoz and moved to the moderate ranks, and in the Restoration, to the conservatives of Cánovas).
- Luis González Bravo (initially progressive, came to head the moderate government characterized by the harshest repression in the final period of Isabella II, and approached the Carlists, already in exile).
- Juan Valera.
- Fernando Calderón Collantes (parliamentary speech in defense of the census suffrage, 1844).
- Francisco Agustín Silvela y Blanco.

=== Press ===
The history of the press in Spain was characterized in the 19th century by the predominance of the party press, the newspapers being clearly aligned with a certain political position, although none of them was exactly an official organ. Among the media identified as being aligned with Moderantism, both in Madrid and in the provinces, were:

1820-1823:

- El Censor.
- El Universal.

1833-1836:

- La Abeja, founded and directed by Joaquín Francisco Pacheco.

1836-1840:

- El Porvenir.
- El Correo Nacional.

1840–1843

- El Heraldo.
- El Sol.
- El Castellano.
- El Conservador (Weekly magazine on politics, science and literature -Puritan group-)

1843-1854:

- El Heraldo.
- El Correo Nacional.
- La Época.
- El Diario Español.

1854-1856:

- La España.
- El Parlamento.
- La Verdad.
- La Época.
- El Diario Español.1856-1868:
- La España.
- El Conciliador.
- La Época (Sold by subscription only, by the aristocratic Unión Liberal).

Other moderated newspapers and magazines, no period indicated:

- El Vapor (Barcelona).
- El Guardia Nacional (Barcelona).
- El Papa-Moscas (Burgos).
- La Correspondencia de España.
- La Colmena.
- El Redactor General.
- El Mundo.
- El Eco del Comercio (in other sources it appears as a progressive newspaper -Fermín Caballero-.).
- Revista de España y del Extranjero.
