= Tax riot =

Variety of popular protest in 18th and 19th centuries

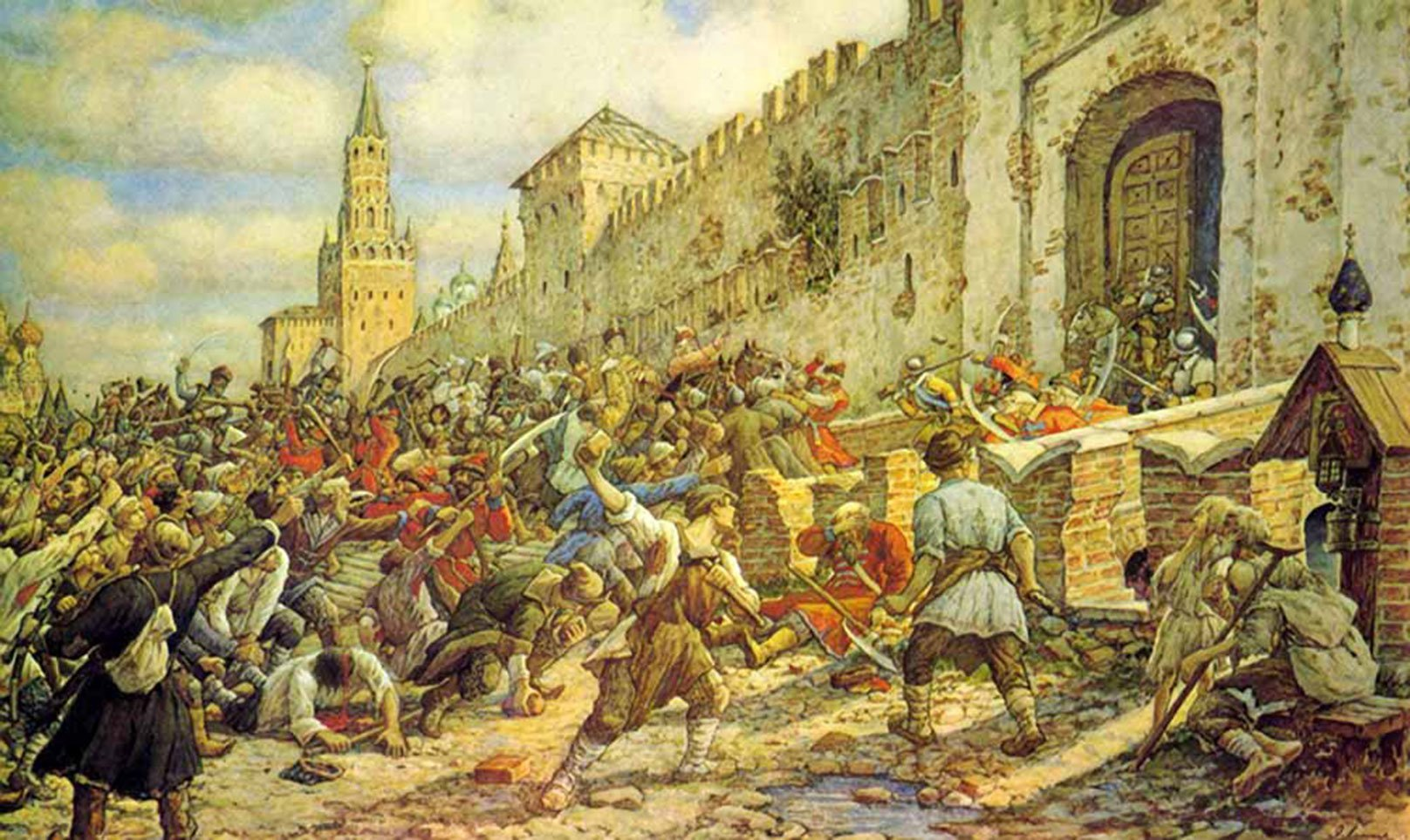
Riot against the new salt tax, 1648 in Moscow, Ernst Lissner

Tax riots are a form of popular protest that was common during the Ancien Régime, the bourgeois revolutions, and the 19th century. They were characterized by direct collective action to prevent the collection of taxes.

== Characteristics ==
The form and contents of tax riots varied depending on the type of tax levying that the rioters were resisting. The most common were defensive riots against tax innovations, either from the absolutist state or from the new centralized states of the Napoleonic system in the 19th century. People frequently identified innovation with illegitimacy, and opponents of the regime could allege that the innovations were designed to increase the tax burden.

There have also been tax rebellions in which the population took advantage of a revolutionary situation to attack offensively and en masse, for example, the manorial records in which feudal tax obligations were recorded. Such actions were frequent during the Reign of Terror in the French Revolution. Sometimes, rebellions with anti-tax components, such as the Boston Tea Party, provoked or emerged from more general revolutionary processes.

=== In Spain ===
In Spain a consumer rebellion broke out against direct taxes in the marketplace introduced by the fiscal reform of Alejandro Mon in 1845. The abolition of this tax formed part of the progressive platform between 1845 and 1868, responding to the revolts that made clear that it was not popular. In the wave of agitation in the Spanish Revolution of 1854 there were many such revolts and a new progressive government abolished the tax. In 1855 they were reintroduced, and in the commotion of the summer of 1856, although the riots of subsistence came first, there were also consumer riots.

=== In Portugal ===
In Portugal on the other hand, the most typical tax revolt consisted of a popular rural rebellion, raised by the ringing of bells, in which the villagers expelled land registry officials when they were assessing properties, or assaulted and destroyed the public building in which the tax liabilities were registered. There were waves of revolts of this sort in 1847, 1862, and 1867, in a stubborn resistance that led the Portuguese government to abandon the development of the land registry.
