= Década moderada =

Period of Spanish history under the Moderate Party (1844–1854)

- 3 May 1844 – 19 July 1854
| Minority of Isabella II | Bienio progresista |
- Monarch: Isabella II
- Prime Minister(s): The Duke of Valencia; The Marquess of Miraflores; Francisco Javier de Istúriz; The Marquess of Casa Irujo; Joaquín Francisco Pacheco; Florencio García Goyena; The Count of Clonard; Juan Bravo Murillo; The Count of Alcoy; Francisco Lersundi; The Count of San Luis; The Marquess of Mendigorría; The Duke of Rivas
- Key events: Spanish tax reform of 1845; Spanish Revolution of 1854

In the history of Spain, the década moderada (Spanish pronunciation: [ˈdekaða moðeˈɾaða], "moderate decade") was the period from May 1844 to July 1854, during which the Moderate Party continuously held power.

== Rise to power ==
The Moderate Party, like the Progressive Party it displaced, identified itself as liberal, but it was considerably more conservative than the Progressives. Whereas the Progressives had little ground for compromise with Carlism, the Moderate Party was in more of a position to cooperate with moderate elements from among the losing side of the First Carlist War, and the Convention of Vergara had allowed many of the latter to return to participation in government and politics.

When the Moderate Party under General Ramón María Narváez first took power in May 1844, they inherited the progressive Spanish Constitution of 1837, and promptly set about revising it to be more in line with their principals. They wished to have a system that allowed certain liberties, but above all they wished to establish a centralized government and economic liberalism that they believed would lead to transformation and economic growth.

== Policy ==
At the beginning of the década moderada, Queen Isabella II was only 13 years old; Maria Christina of the Two Sicilies was regent. Narváez began a series of reforms to strengthen the monarchy and centralize the state. He curtailed freedom of expression, put an end to the popular election of municipal officials, and eliminated the National Militia. In October 1844, to replace the National Militia, he created the Civil Guard (Spanish: Guardia Civil), a security force that has continued down to the present day under various Spanish regimes. The system of education was reorganized along lines proposed by Claudio Moyano.

The Moderates inherited the organization of Spain into provinces and municipalities, established by Javier de Burgos in the 1833 territorial division of the country. Each province was given a centrally appointed Civil Governor, and he, in turn, named the heads of the municipalities. In practice, this gave the Moderates a monopoly of power at all levels and control of all institutions of governance and administration. Their desire for order required a certain respect for the fueros that granted special rights to some of the provinces. Nevertheless, some of the provinces were disgruntled with the increased centralism, as shown by events such as the Solís Uprising of 1846.

== Constitution of 1845 ==
The Moderate Party established the Spanish Constitution of 1845, under which sovereignty and legislative power were both shared between the Spanish monarchy and the Cortes. The Cortes consisted of a Congress of Deputies and a Senate. The Congress was elected under census suffrage; the wealth requirements limited the franchise to less than one percent of the population. The Senate, whose size was not fixed, was appointed by the Queen. Although the constitution declared rights such as freedom of expression, these rights were subject to laws passed by the Cortes: wealthy men who intended to maintain a monopoly of power that excluded even the leaders of the Progressive Party, let alone the average citizen.

== Religion ==
The Moderates set out to resolve the conflict with the Catholic Church that had been created by the disentailment of church properties. Many Spanish Catholics were of the opinion that the clergy had suffered an inappropriate attack on their means of gaining a living; in this matter, the Holy See had a great deal of support among the populace against the government. The government of Bravo Murillo ultimately achieved the Concordat of 1851, under which the Pope accepted the disentailments and the state committed itself to the maintenance of the Church. The Government was confirmed in the right to present names of proposed bishops, inherited from the royal Concordat of 1753. Thus, the government was guaranteed an ecclesiastical hierarchy appointed at its pleasure, as well.

This process of improved relations with the Church established a basis for general tranquility in religious matters, which was fundamental to establish any general civil peace.

== Economy ==
The Moderates attempted a major reform of taxation along more rational lines. They eliminated innumerable old, narrow taxes and attempted to make those that remained more just and controllable. Finance minister Alejandro Mon and his collaborator Ramón de Santillán attempted to establish a balanced budget under the Spanish tax reform of 1845, also known as the Ley Mon-Santillán ("Mon-Santillán Law").

The original intent of the new system of taxation was a direct income tax on all citizens. It was difficult to apply such a system, though, because there were no reliable statistics, and much fraud. Instead, they changed to a system of indirect taxation that affected all consumers independent of their incomes. These new taxes lowered the standard of living of the general populace, resulting in many popular protests, and ultimately triggering the 1854 revolution known as the Vicalvarada, ushering in a brief return to power by the Progressive Party, the bienio progresista ("Progressive Biennium").

== See also ==
- Moderantism

== Sources ==
- José Luis Comellas García-Llera, Los moderados en el poder, 1844-1854, Madrid: Consejo Superior de Investigaciones Científicas, 1970. ISBN 84-00-01958-X.
- Carlos Seco Serrano, "La década moderada", in La ingeniería del agua en España en el siglo XIX : ciclo de conferencias, Fundación Canal de Isabel II, 2002, p. 19-38.
