= Spanish tax reform of 1845 =

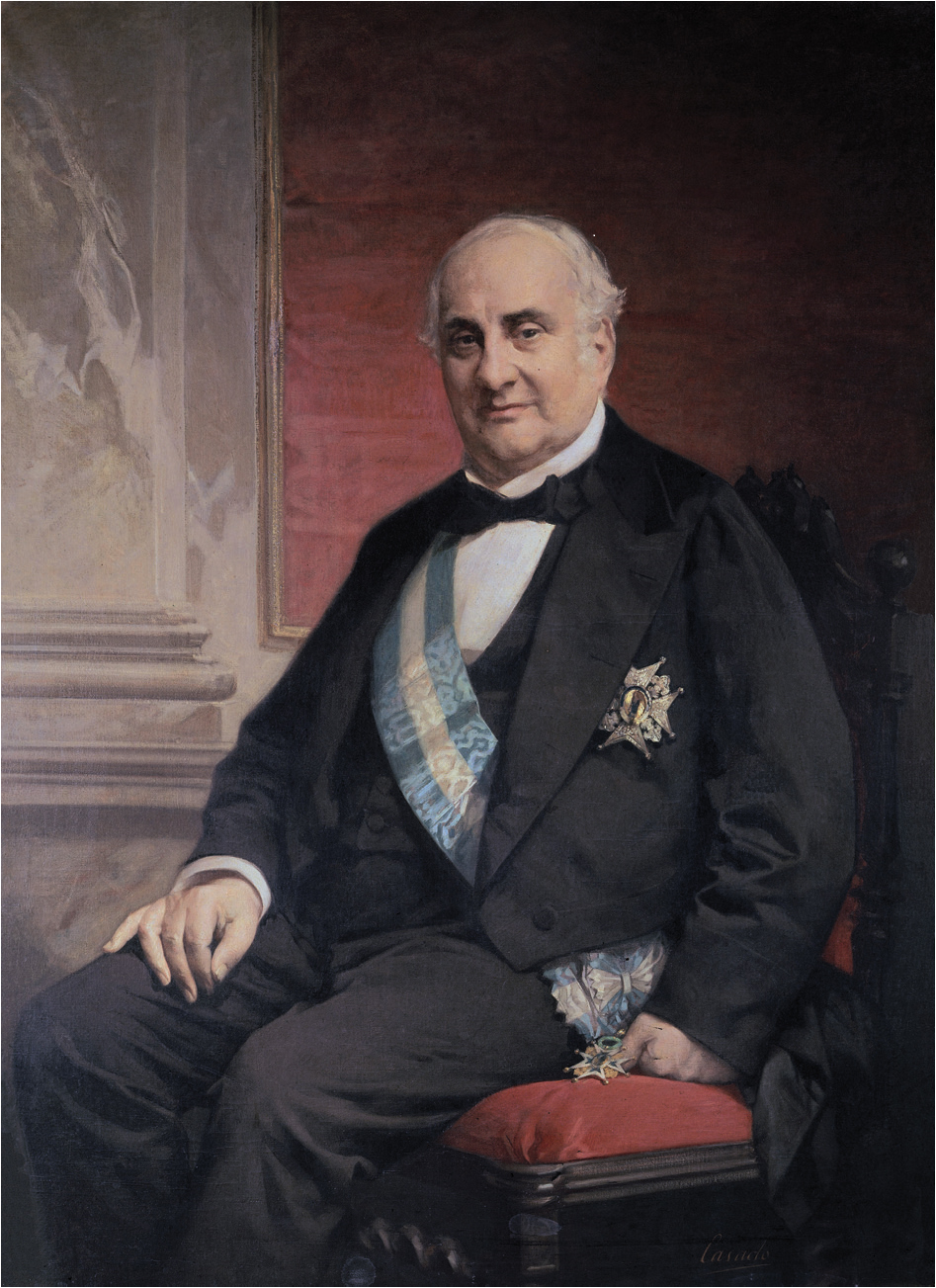
Alejandro Mon, Finance Minister of Spain in 1845.

The Spanish tax reform of 1845, approved in 1844, greatly changed the tax system of Spain. It established the basis for a system that continues to this day.

== Background ==
In the summer of 1843, a military coup led by the Moderate generals Francisco Serrano, Ramón María Narváez and Juan Prim removed the Progressive leader Baldomero Espartero from his position as regent, ending a three-year Progressive ascendancy. Queen Isabella II, who had just reached the age of 13, was declared to have reached the age of majority, ending the regency. Within a year, that led to the beginning of the década moderada, ten years of rule by the Moderates.

== Reform ==
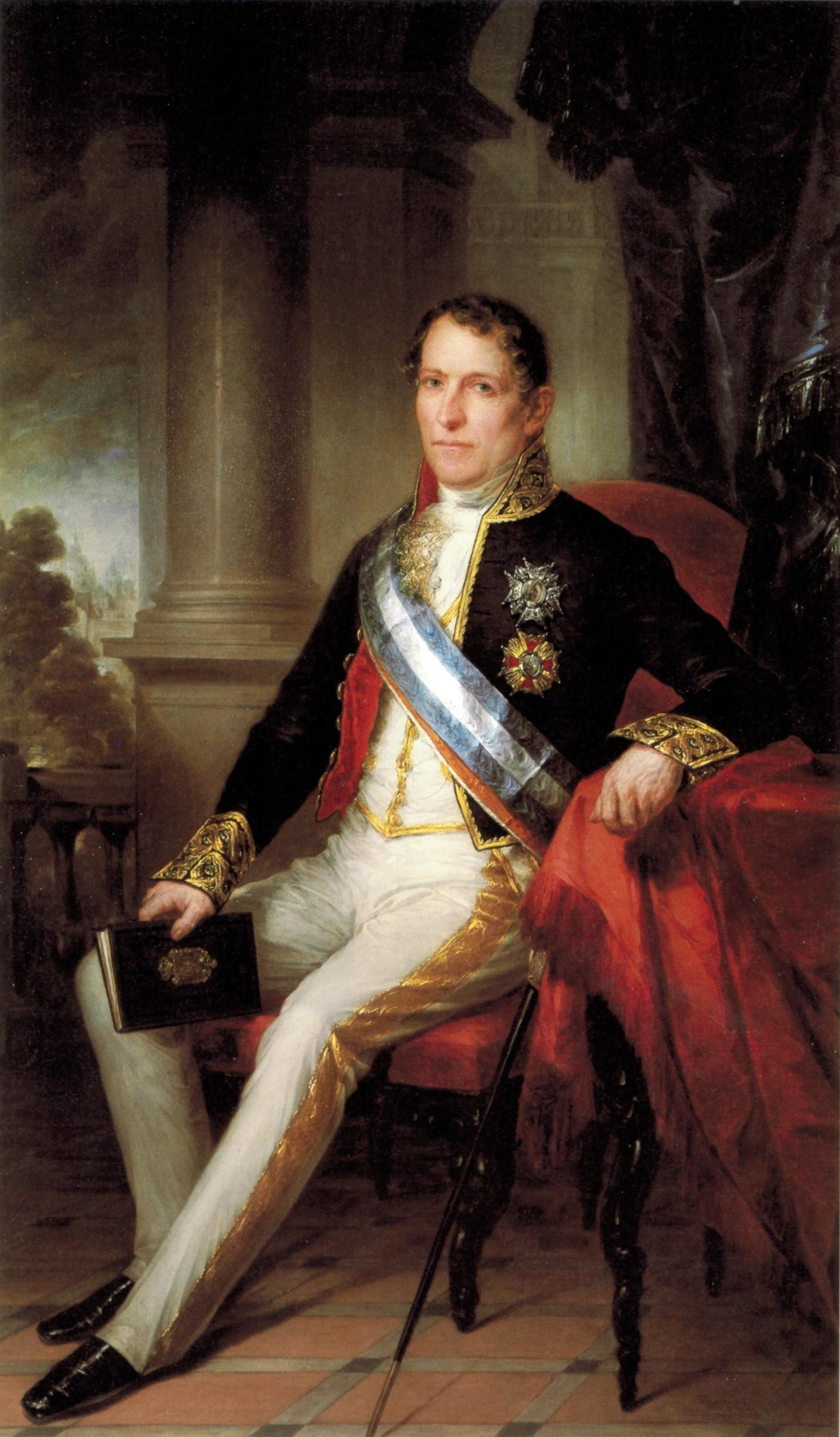
Ramón de Santillán was one of the key figures who drove the tax reform of 1845.

The executive council that came to power in 1844 was presided over by Narváez. It undertook a tax reform, proposed by a commission whose key figure was the brilliant but logical and orderly Ramón de Santillán. It was carried out by Finance Minister Alejandro Mon. The reform broke the tax system of Antiguo Régimen and established a basis for taxation in Spain that remained intact to the end of the 19th century, and most of it continued well past that date, some remaining today.

The prior system had separate tax regimes in the former Crown of Aragon, in Navarre, in the Basque Country and in the rest of Spain. It involved a great variety of taxes, most of them dating from the Middle Ages.

The reform was largely along the lines of economic liberalism: legality, sufficiency and generality with a single unified fiscal system throughout the country, with the intention to eliminate barriers to economic growth. Internal customs barriers were eliminated along with such longstanding taxes as the diezmos, alcabala and millones. In general, there was a movement from indirect taxation to direct taxation. The new system involved five key taxes:

- Direct taxes
  - A tax on real property, crops and livestock was projected to provide approximately 25 percent of revenue.
  - A subsidy to industry and trade, which was divided into a variable and a fixed portion.
  - A law of tenancy, which only remained in effect for a year.
- Indirect taxes
  - Consumption taxes on certain goods such as alcoholic beverages, olive oil, soap and meat and state monopolies on other goods such as snuff, salt and lotteries.
  - A law on mortgages, which taxed the transfer, lease, and increase of rents on real estate.

The reform also constituted changes in customs fees (tariffs).

== Aftermath ==
The industrial and commercial subsidy was widely protested and resulted in a high level of fraud. The administrative apparatus of the Spanish government was poorly prepared for the new system and so tax collection was farmed to municipal governments and guilds. The consumption taxes were also widely protested. They were seen as falling disproportionately on the poor.

The tax reform provided the basis for the recovery of Spain's finances during Isabella's reign and allowed a program of public works. The system remained essentially intact until 1900, when the effect of the loss of Spain's colonies in the Spanish–American War led to a further tax reform by Raimundo Fernández Villaverde.

== Sources ==
- Comellas, José Luis. Historia de España, Moderna y contemporánea (in Spanish). Rialp. ISBN 84-321-0251-2.
- Tamames, Ramón; Rueda, Ramón. Estructura económica de España (in Spanish). Alianza Editorial. ISBN 84-206-4259-2.
