= Ramón de Santillán =

Spanish statesman

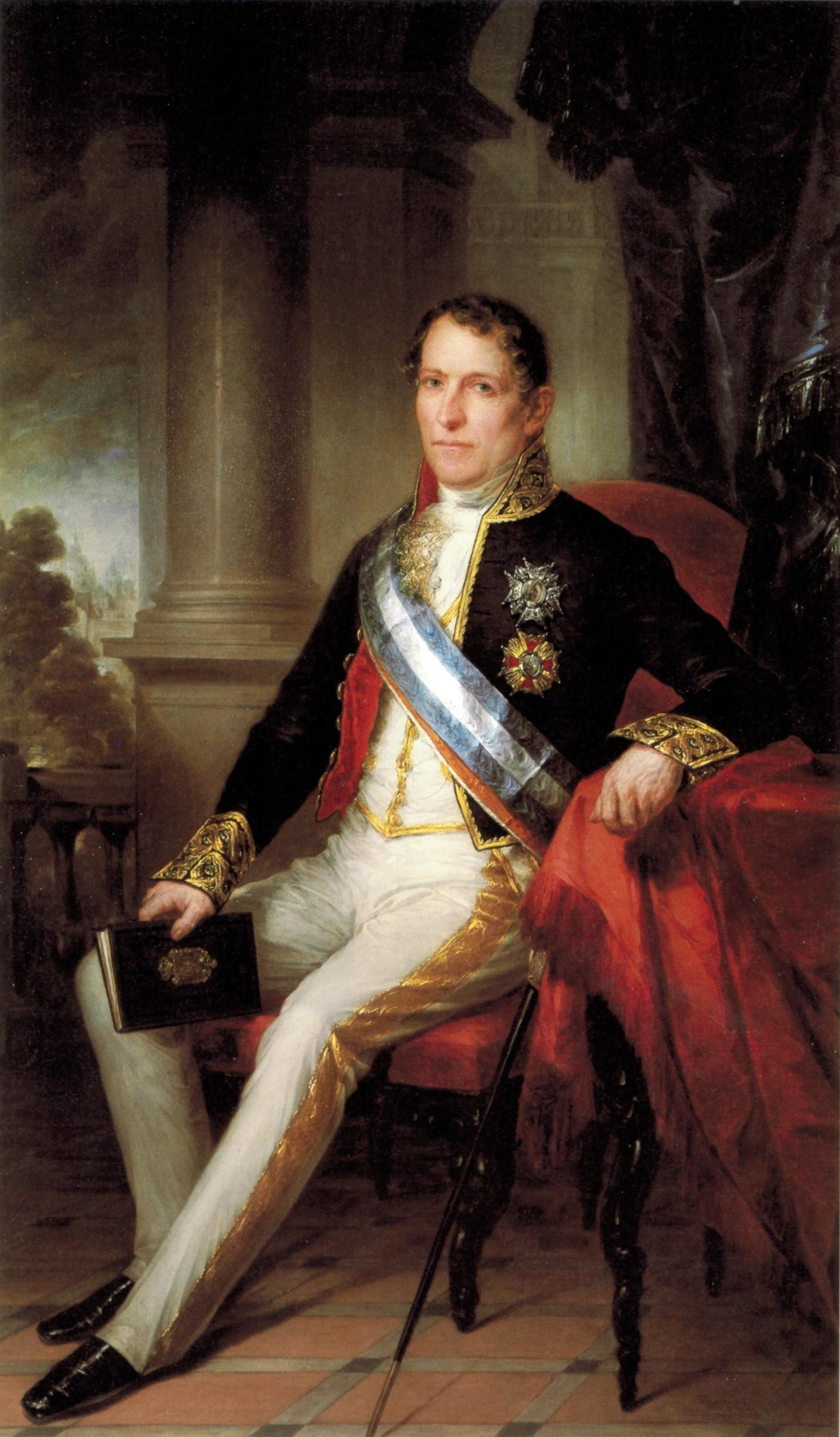
Portrait of Ramón de Santillán González by José Gutiérrez de la Vega, from the art collection of the Bank of Spain.

Ramón de Santillán González (30 August 1791 – October 19, 1863) was a Spanish statesman who served as Minister of Finance and First Governor of the Bank of Spain.

== Life ==
Santillán was born in Lerma (province of Burgos). He came from a relatively poor family. He matriculated in law at the University of Valladolid in 1805; his studies were interrupted by the Peninsular War. He enlisted in 1809 as a corporal in the army led by the priest Jerónimo Merino fighting for Spanish independence. He soon rose to the rank of lieutenant, and obtained the rank of captain in 1812. He remained in the Spanish Army until 1824, when he was purged from the ranks after the end of Trienio Liberal for his support of the liberal regime, despite his not having originally been an enthusiast of the uprising that brought it to power.

Nonetheless, in 1825 he was hired by the Ministry of Finance, and in the 1830s occupied responsible positions under Juan Álvarez Mendizábal. Shortly before the fall of the regent Maria Christina of the Two Sicilies, during the minority of Queen Isabella II, he was named Minister of Finance, serving from April to July 1840, at which time the Progressive general Baldomero Espartero became regent. Despite being removed as minister, he remained at the ministry, where he worked with the Progressive finance ministers Agustín Fernández Gamboa and Pedro Surrá y Rull and later with their Moderate Party successor Juan José García Carrasco Romero, as well as with colleagues Alejandro Mon y Menéndez and Pita Pizarro.

Although the Spanish tax reform of 1845 is often attributed solely to Mon, Santillán was his close collaborator. He was named a senator for life in the legislature of 1845-46. He served briefly again as Minister of Finance (28 January 1847 – 28 March 1847), and was responsible for major improvements in the public banking system of Spain through the 1849 unification of the Bank of San Fernando with the Bank of Isabella II into a single entity, of which he was the first governor. This merged bank initially retained the name of the Bank of San Fernando.

In 1854, months before the end of the década moderada, Santillán was dismissed for refusing the demands of the Spanish Treasury. However, during the ensuing bienio progresista, when the Bank of San Fernando became the Bank of Spain in January 1856, he was named its first governor; he remained in the post until his death in Madrid in November 1863.

== Ideology ==
Santillán's views fell within the range of the Spanish liberalism of his time. In general, he was a conservative liberal, aligned with the Moderate Party rather than with the Progressives, but he was not a party militant. In the 1850s, he aligned with the Liberal Union, which attempted to steer an intermediate course between those two factions.

== Legacy ==
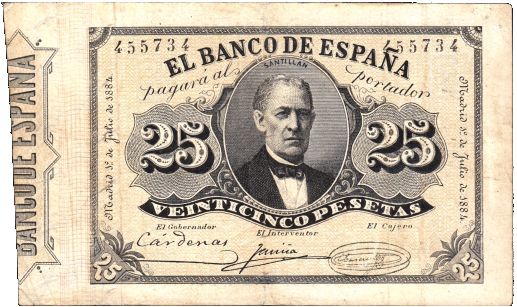
Santillán on a 1884 25 pesetas banknote

Santillán was depicted on Spanish banknotes twice, on the 25 pesetas banknote of 1884 and on the 1000 pesetas banknote of 1949.

=== Works ===
- Memoria Histórica sobre los Bancos Nacionales de San Carlos, Español de San Fernando, Isabel II, Nuevo de San Fernando y de España (1858), reissued by the Bank of Spain in 1982.
- Memorias (1860)
