= Bienio progresista =

Period of Spanish history under the Progressive Party (1854–1856)

In the history of Spain, the bienio progresista (Spanish pronunciation: [ˈbjenjo pɾoɣɾeˈsista], "Progressive Biennium" or "Progressivist Biennium") was the two-year period from July 1854 to July 1856, during which the Progressive Party attempted to reform the political system of the reign of Isabella II, which had been dominated by the Moderate Party since 1843 in the so-called década moderada. The Progressives were exaltados or veinteañistas, advocates of radical liberalism, in contrast to the conservative liberalism of the doceañistas or Moderates.

== Background ==
After a decade of rule by the Moderates, the Spanish were aware of massive government corruption in the entrenched Moderate regime. Furthermore, all but the wealthiest were disenfranchised by a system of census suffrage that left less than one percent of the population eligible to participate in the country's electoral politics.

The perceived injustice of this situation provoked protests and subversive movements. These movements were led by those liberal leaders who were not in accord with the Moderate government. For the most part, this meant the Progressives, but there were also moderates such as General Leopoldo O'Donnell who were simply opposed to what was an increasingly corrupt and ineffective regime.

The dismissal of prime minister Juan Bravo Murillo toward the end of 1852 marked the acceleration of the decline of the Moderate regime. The government attempted to rule by decree, ignoring its own constitution. Even many of the most prominent Moderates were unhappy with the cabinet that had been hand-picked by the queen mother Maria Christina of the Two Sicilies. Francisco Martínez de la Rosa, Alejandro Mon y Menéndez and Leopoldo O'Donnell wished to form a government that would restore the country's confidence without handing power over to the Progressives, but they were excluded from any role in the government.

== La Vicalvarada ==
Street protests began in Zaragoza in February 1854, and had extended throughout the country by July. On 28 June 1854, O'Donnell, who had been hiding in Madrid during a wave of persecutions of prominent figures not aligned with the current regime, managed to unite diverse forces and to confront troops loyal to the government at Vicálvaro southeast of Madrid, where he demanded a new government that would put an end to the corruption. He made it clear that he respected Queen Isabella, but not her government. This coup attempt became known as La Vicalvarada; it did not result in the immediate fall of the government, but neither was it quickly crushed. Through the ensuing weeks, troops in Barcelona also pronounced in favor of La Vicalvarada.

General O'Donnell and his troops retired to the south, where they connected with the Progressive general Serrano. Together they issued the Manifesto of Manzanares on 7 July 1854:

We wish to preserve the Throne, but without the camarilla that dishonors it; we wish the rigorous practice of the fundamental laws, above all those of elections and the press (...); we wish seniority and merit to be respected in civil and military employment (...); we wish to lift from the populations the centralization that is devouring them, giving them the local independence necessary to conserve and augment their own interests; and as a guarantee of all that we wish and to place ourselves on a solid basis, the National Militia. These are our intentions, which we express frankly without imposing these on the Nation. The organs of government that ought to be constituted in free provinces, the Cortes generales that will later bring them together, the Nation itself, finally, will set the definitive bases for the liberal regeneration to which we aspire. We have consecrated our swords to the national will, and will not sheathe them until that will is satisfied.

This manifesto was distributed among the populace, inviting the people to rise up in support. The popular reaction was immediate, with agitations and popular revolts throughout the country in support of the Manifesto. On 17 July, civilians and soldiers took to the streets of Madrid, (as well as Alzira, Cuenca, Logroño, Valencia and Zaragoza) in a violent uprising that threatened the life of queen mother Maria Christina, who had to seek refuge. The result was a revolution, to which the Catalan workers also allied themselves.

Isabella II had no choice but to accede to the demands of the Manifesto. The bienio progresista began.

== Development ==
The bienio progresista was a period full of illusion and hope among great sectors of the populace. The new government led by Baldomero Espartero attempted to put the Manifesto of Manzanares into practice, but ultimately it failed.

=== Political aspect ===
The Progressives, desiring a progressive constitution, annulled the Moderate Constitution of 1845 and attempted to write a new constitution based on the Progressive Constitution of 1837. However, they proved not to have enough unity to agree on a text. Nonetheless, they supported the rights of citizens, such as freedom of expression, freedom of the press, and freedom of political association. Other political parties arose, including socialist and federalist parties. The political panorama became much more complicated. Taking advantage of the new liberties, the workers' movement sprang into action, above all by means of the general strike. The peasants also began to protest and demand improvements in their situation.

Municipal government was decentralized, with the restoration of local elections. The resulting municipal governments were yet another source of pressure on the Progressive government. On the other hand, the Moderates in the Cortes hounded the Progressives, taking advantage of a free press to attack them from the right.

=== Legislative and economic aspects ===
In the midst of all this political instability, the government brought about a major economic reform. First, there was the civil confiscation under Finance Minister Pascual Madoz: properties owned by municipalities, military orders, hospitals, hospices and casas de misericordia (charity homes) were confiscated and sold to raise funds for the State. The negative consequences were suffered not only by the agents of these institutions but by the poorer villagers, who used the municipal commons for their subsistence. When these lands were placed in private hands, they could no longer use them. Second, another law gave major benefits and privileges to whoever would invest in the construction of railways, given that transport was essential to the process of industrialization that was beginning to develop in Spain. Under this law, foreign investors, especially from France and the United Kingdom employed their capital in constructing railways; the law also proved very beneficial to the banks. Third and finally, a liberalization of banking and corporate law attempted to expand the financial system to underwrite industrial development.

Whatever the intentions, the result was chaos. In the face of instability and conflict, O'Donnell led another coup in July 1856. The bienio progresista had ended in failure.

== See also ==
- Trienio liberal
- Sexenio Democrático
