= Juan Bravo Murillo =

Spanish politician, jurist and economist (1803–1873)

The Most Excellent Juan Bravo Murillo
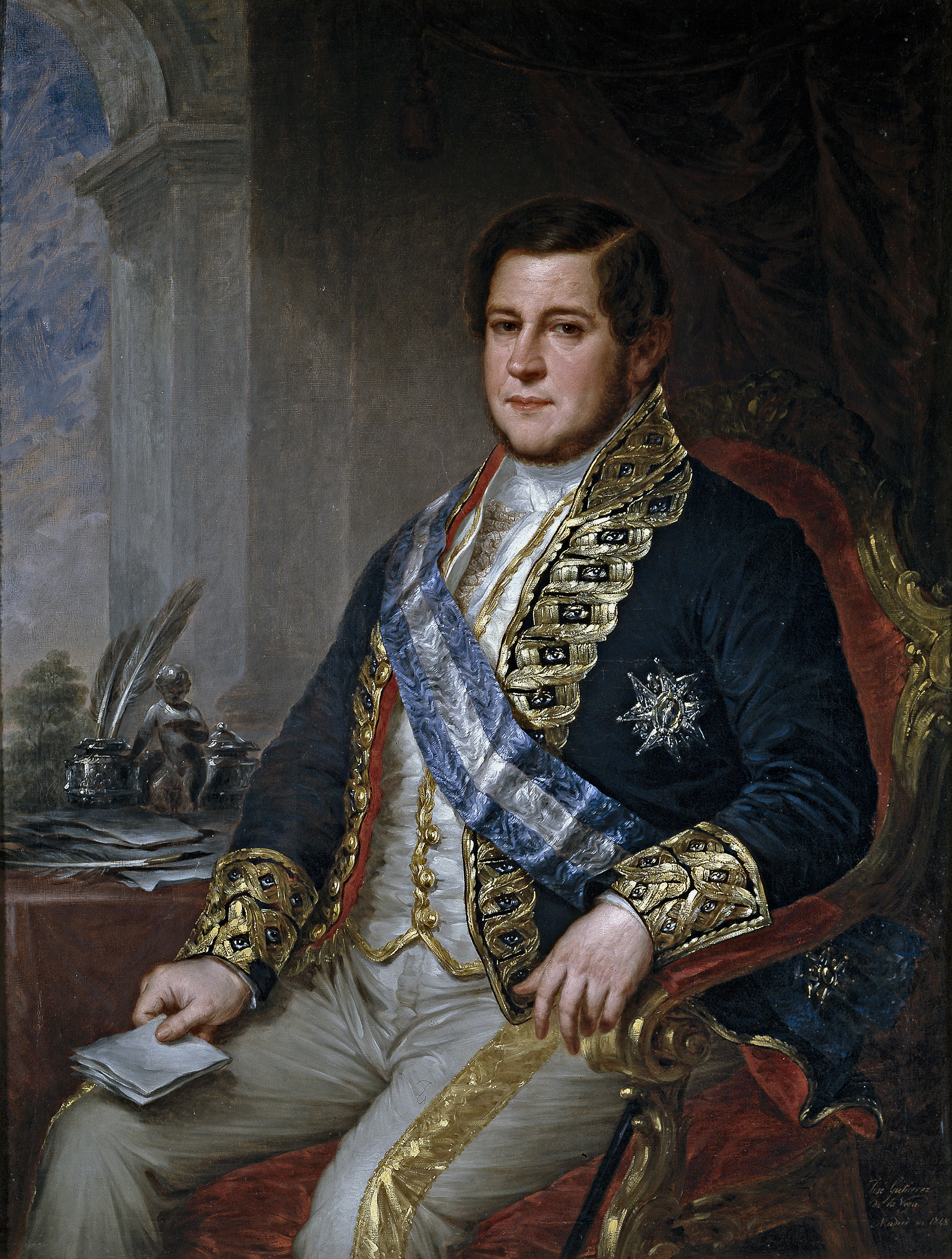
- Portrait by Gutiérrez de la Vega

Prime Minister of Spain
- In office 14 January 1851 – 14 December 1852
- Monarch: Isabella II
- Preceded by: The Duke of Valencia
- Succeeded by: The Count of Alcoy

President of the Congress of Deputies
- In office 11 January 1858 – 13 May 1858
- Preceded by: Francisco Martínez de la Rosa
- Succeeded by: Francisco Martínez de la Rosa

Minister of Grace and Justice
- In office 28 January 1847 – 28 March 1847
- In office 28 July 1851 – 3 September 1851

Minister of Finance
- In office 19 August 1849 – 19 October 1849
- In office 20 October 1849 – 29 November 1850
- In office 14 January 1851 – 14 December 1852

Acting Minister of the Navy
- In office 16 January 1849 – 29 January 1849

Minister of Trade, Public Instruction and Works
- In office 10 November 1847 – 13 September 1849

Member of the Congress of Deputies
- In office 1837 – 1858

Senator for life
- In office 1863 – 1868

Personal details
- Born: 24 June 1803 Fregenal de la Sierra, Spain
- Died: 11 February 1873 Madrid, Spain
- Party: Moderate Party
- Profession: Lawyer

Juan Bravo Murillo (24 June 1803 – 11 February 1873) was a Spanish politician and lawyer. During the reign of Isabella II, he served as prime minister of Spain from 1851 to 1852 and several times as Crown minister, among other political positions.

== Origins ==
Bravo Murillo was born in Fregenal de la Sierra on 24 June 1803. After briefly studying theology, he studied law at the University of Salamanca and the University of Seville, obtaining his licentiate from Seville in 1825. He practiced law for a time in Seville. After the death of Fernando VII in 1833 he was named prosecutor of the Audiencia Provincial of Cádiz, a position he held for two years before moving to Madrid, where he co-published a journal called Boletín de Jurisprudencia. He was also a founder of the conservative newspaper El Porvenir.

== Political career ==
He was elected a deputy (member of the lower house of Spain's parliament) in 1837 and 1840 as a member of the Moderate Party. However, his reactionary views kept him out of leadership during the decidedly liberal ascendancy of General Baldomero Espartero, regent during this portion of the minority of Isabella II. He emigrated briefly to France after the Spanish Revolution of 1841, but returned in 1843 after Espartero's fall, the beginning of the década moderada.

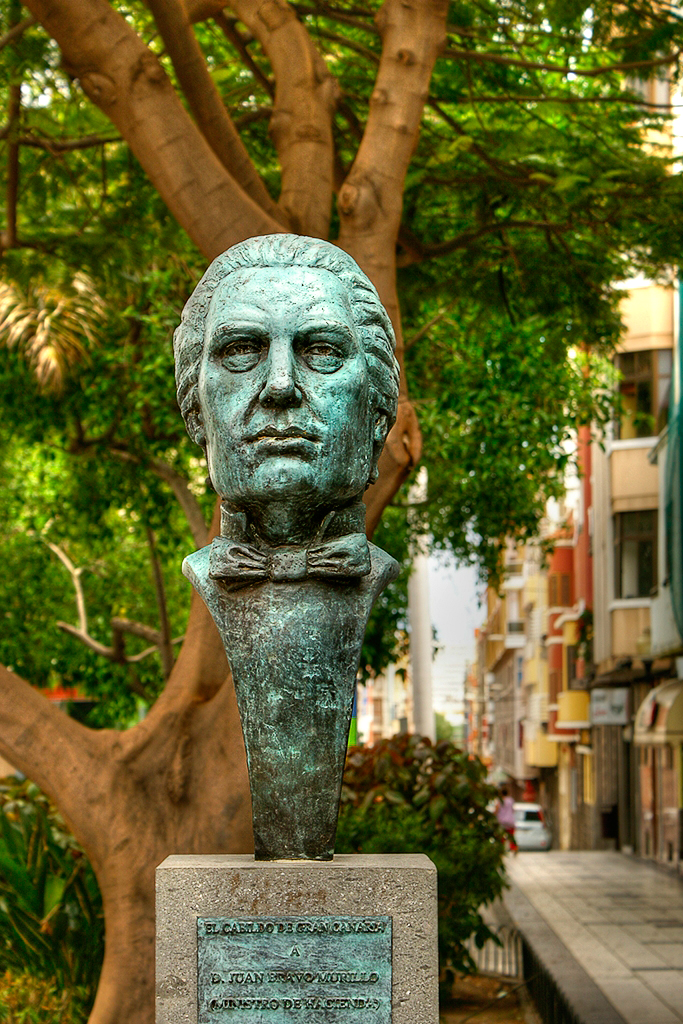
Bust of Bravo Murillo in Las Palmas de Gran Canaria.

In January 1847 he was named Minister of Grace and Justice in the government of Carlos Martínez de Irujo, Duke of Sotomayor. General Ramón María Narváez later named him Minister of Commerce, Instruction, and Public Works, then in 1849 Minister of Finance. He was named President of the Council of Ministers of Spain, effectively prime minister, taking office on 14 January 1851, while serving as his own Minister of Finance. The events of the Revolutions of 1848 throughout Europe led him to propose an anti-parliamentarian, absolutist constitution for Spain in 1852, countering the moderate liberal tendency of the Spanish Constitution of 1845, but it proved unpopular and was rejected. He lost his position as head of government 14 December 1852; the onset of the bienio progresista some 18 months later led him to leave Spain, returning in 1856. He served as President of the Congress of Deputies in 1858, and was named to the Spanish Senate in 1863 as a senator for life.

He is responsible for founding Canal de Isabel II, the public company that still brings water to Madrid, the establishment of civil service exams (oposiciones), the introduction of the metric system into Spain in 1849, the Concordat of 1851 that settled differences between the Spanish government and the Holy See, and the 1852 Canaries Free Ports Act. He was also responsible for a variety of measures in his capacity as minister of finance, and founded what later became the Boletín Oficial del Estado, which remains the Spanish government's official gazette to this day.

The most interesting of his writings were published in six volumes entitled Opúsculos ("Pamphlets", 1863–1874). He died in Madrid on 11 February 1873.

=== Elections to Congress of Deputies ===
Bravo Murillo was elected to the Congress of Deputies on 12 occasions, and represented constituencies in five different provinces (sometimes two of them at the same time):

Election number	Election date	District	Province	Took office	Left office
09	22 September 1837	At large	Seville	19 December 1837	1 June 1839
11	19 January 1840	At large	Ávila	21 February 1840	11 October 1840
14	15 September 1843	At large	Badajoz	18 October 1843	10 July 1844
15	3 September 1844	At large	Badajoz	14 October 1844	31 October 1846
16	21 June 1846	Fregenal de la Sierra	Badajoz	3 January 1847	18 December 1848
16	21 June 1846	Fregenal de la Sierra	Badajoz	20 December 1847	4 August 1850
17	31 August 1850	Fregenal de la Sierra	Badajoz	6 November 1850	7 April 1851
17	31 August 1850	Huelva	Huelva	6 November 1850	15 November 1850
18	10 May 1851	Elche de la Sierra	Albacete	4 June 1851	17 June 1851
18	10 May 1851	Fregenal de la Sierra	Badajoz	4 June 1851	2 December 1852
19	4 February 1853	Fregenal de la Sierra	Badajoz	15 March 1853	10 December 1853
21	25 February 1857	Fregenal de la Sierra	Badajoz	6 May 1857	13 May 1858

=== Ministers in his governments ===
==== First ministry ====
- President: Juan Bravo Murillo
- State: Manuel Bertrán de Lis y Ribes
- Finance: Juan Bravo Murillo
- Grace and Justice: Ventura González Romero
- Governance: Fermín Arteta
- War: Rafael de Arístegui (Count of Mirasol)
- Marine: José María Bustillo (Count of Bustillo)
- Development: Santiago Fernández Negrete

==== Second (reorganized) ministry ====
- President: Juan Bravo Murillo
- State: Manuel Pando Fernández de Pineda (Marquis of Miraflores); later Manuel Bertrán de Lis Ribes returned to the position.
- Finance: Juan Bravo Murillo
- Grace and Justice: Ventura González Romero
- Governance: Manuel Bertrán de Lis Ribes, later Melchor Ordóñez and Cristóbal Bordíu
- War: Francisco Alejandro Lersundi y Ormaechea, later Cayetano Urbina y Daoiz
- Marine: Francisco Armero de Peñaranda (Marquess of Nervión), later Joaquín Ezpeleta y Enrile
- Development: Fermín Arteta, later Mariano Miguel Reinoso

Preceded by Ramón María Narváez	President of the Council of Ministers of Spain; 1851–1852	Succeeded by Federico Roncali
