= Spanish Revolution of 1854 =

1854 revolution in Spain

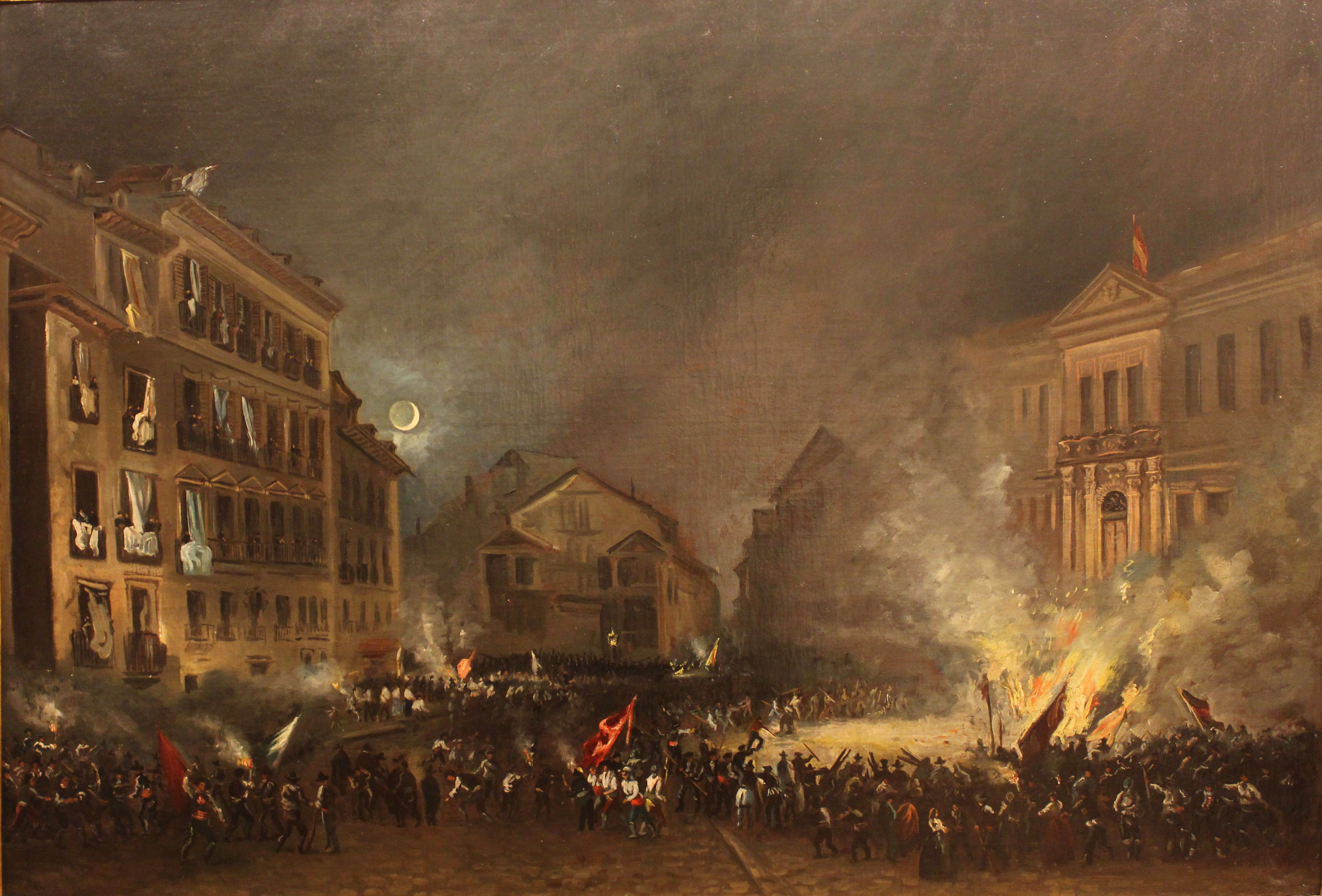
Episode of the 1854 Revolution in the Puerta del Sol, by Eugenio Lucas Velázquez.

The Spanish Revolution of 1854, also known by the name Vicalvarada, started with a confrontation between rebel troops under General Leopoldo O'Donnell, 1st Duke of Tetuan and government troops near the village of Vicálvaro.

This incident was followed by a military coup and a popular uprising, which occurred between 28 June and 28 July 1854, during the reign of Isabella II of Spain.

The Spanish Revolution ended the moderate decade (década moderada) (1844-1854) and started the progressive biennium (bienio progresista) (1854-1856).

== History ==
The first steps towards revolution began on 20 February 1854, when militant followers of the Democratic Party, aided by civilians like Eduardo Ruiz Pons, attempted to carry out an uprising in Zaragoza, but failed.

Provoked by the abuse of parliamentary powers by the Crown at the end of the “moderate decade”, the moderates led by General Ramon Maria Narvaez and the "puritan" moderates led by Joaquín Francisco Pacheco and Ríos Rosas joined forces with the progressives headed by General Baldomero Espartero and Salustiano de Olozaga. Together they formed an electoral committee to present candidates together with the goal of preserving the democratic regime being threatened. The “puritans” began talks with military attachés such as General Leopoldo O’Donnell, and progressives, like Generals Domingo Dulce and Ros de Olano, in order to organize a revolt with the goal of forcing Queen Isabel II to replace the government headed by Count San Luis - which lacked support from the courts and was solely supported by the crown - with another "liberal conciliation" that would return to the intentions and "spirit" of the 1845 constitution. On 28 June 1854, General O’Donnell brought into motion the revolt, but a skirmish a few days later with royal troops in a village outside of Madrid, Vicalvaro - where the revolution gets its name from, La Vicalvarada - proved difficult. The battle resulted in no clear victors, though several parties attempted to claim it as such. As a result, O’Donnell's forces were pushed back to the Vagando Sea by La Mancha and back into Portugal, awaiting the arrival of other military forces adding to the movement. In their pursuit of O’Donnell's retreating forces, the government troops left the city, leaving the capital unguarded - a choice that would later be a deciding factor in the outcome of the revolution.

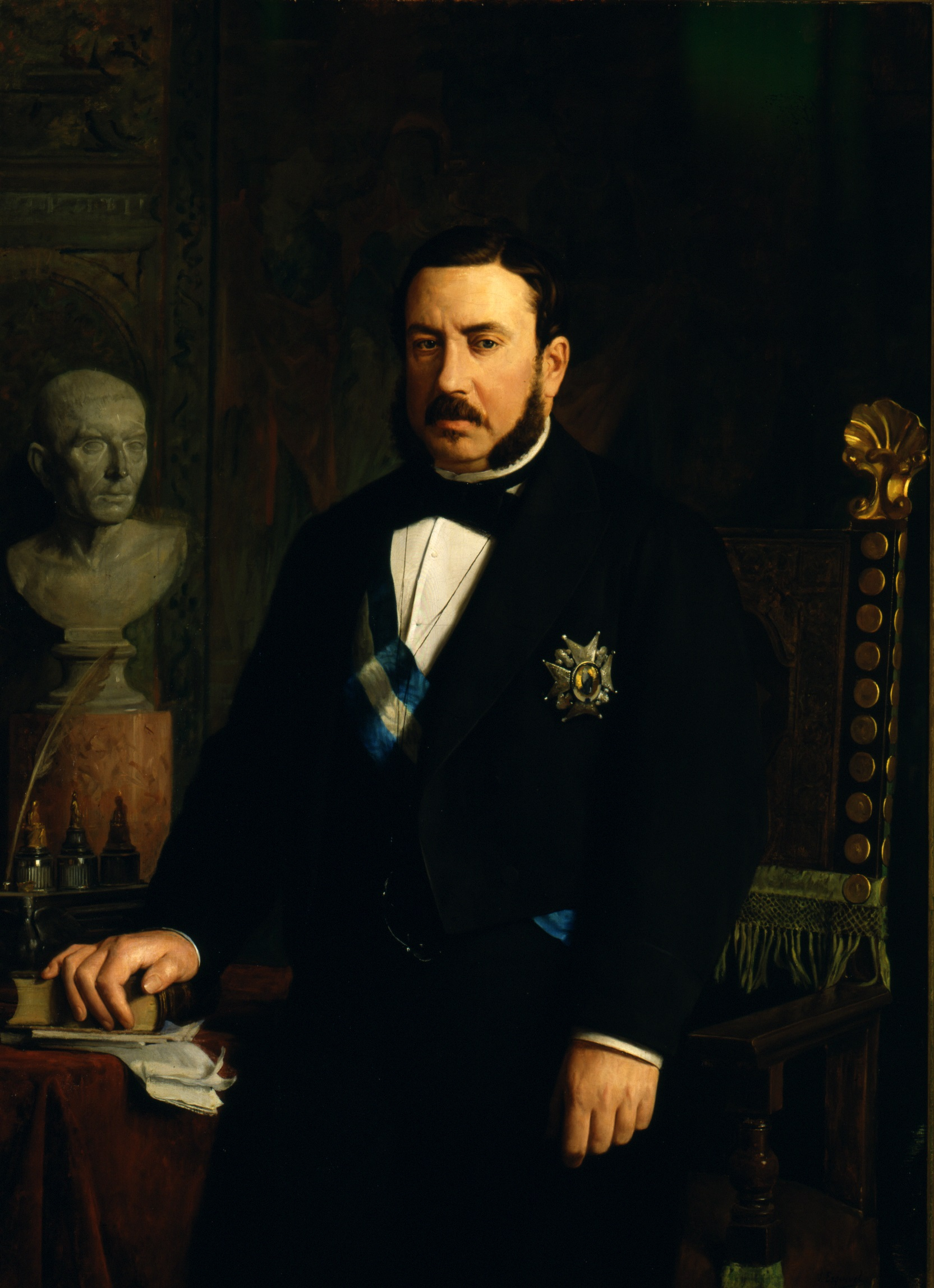
Jose Luis Sartorius

Before the chaos of the initial uprising, the military forces heading the movement attempted to gain popular support. In Manzanares, General O’Donnell met with General Serrano, who convinced him it was necessary to turn around the movement by offering political changes that "weren't originally part of the movement's intentions". Thus, the Manzanares Manifest was born, written by a young Antonio Cánovas del Castillo. Published on 7 July, it promised a "liberal renaissance". Its proposals included conserving the monarchy but taking away the monarch's entourage, lowering taxes and re-establishing the national militia (two long-held aspirations of the progressives and democrats), new printing and electoral laws, and the decentralization of administrative power. According to Jorge Vilches, as a result, the conspirators intended to "gather the opposition against the government of Count San Luis and discover more ways to pressure the queen".

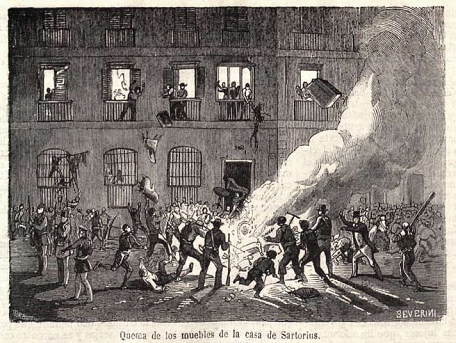
Burning of Sartorius' House

The second phase of the revolution was led primarily by the progressives and democrats, who led an insurrection on 14 July in Barcelona - intensified by the aid of laborers. On 17 July, another insurrection in Madrid saw copies of the Manifest disseminated prior to an attack on the palaces of the Marquis of Salamanca. Such attacks extended to the president, the Count of San Luís, and the Queen Mother, María Cristina de Borbón, who had to take refuge with her children in the East Palace. Finally, the insurrectionists attacked the Saldero prison in order to liberate the democrats Nicolás María Rivero and Sixto Cámara. Similar militaristic revolts were seen in other cities like Valencia and Valladolid. The latter protest became a peaceful one led by the chant "more bread, less consumption", which also occurred in other Leonese, Catalan, and Asturian cities., According to some sources, the revolters wanted not only the re-establishment of the national military, but also the suppression of the 1845 moderate constitution and amnesty for their political prisoners.There were also uprisings in Zaragoza and Logroño. According to the same sources, the revolution was financed by different economic sectors, and, above all, by the banker Juan Bruil.

On 17 July, before the situation could get worse, the queen dismissed the Count of San Luis. She replaced him with General Fernando Fernandez de Córdova, forming a government with both progressives and moderates, but yielding the presidency to the Duke of Rivas. This new government only lasted two days until the popular revolt. By 18 July, Madrid was full of barricades, making it impossible for leaders O’Donnell and Serrano to accept the government's compromise. The Duke of Rivas tried to suppress the popular uprising - a choice that saw him named the "Minister of Shrapnel" - awaiting the return of backup from troops who had left Madrid.

Finally, the queen, perhaps swayed by her mother, decided to call General Baldomero Espartero, who was, at present, retired in Logroño, in order to form a government. She also asked O’Donnell to return to court. As a condition of his acceptance, Espartero summoned the Constituent Court and asked that the Queen Mother María Cristina respond to accusations of corruption, and that Isabel publish a manifest acknowledging her errors. The queen accepted all of the conditions and on 26 July she published the following manifest addressed to the public:

“The appointment of the Duke of Victoria (Espartero) to the position of president of the Minister Council, assured by my total adherence to his ideas, that which are inspired by and addressed to public support and happiness, will be the best choice for everyone and this country moving forward.”

On 28 July, Espartero made a grand entrance in Madrid, greeted by crowds and hugged his old enemy O’Donnell. Thus began the progressive period, marching María Cristina de Borbón to exile in France.

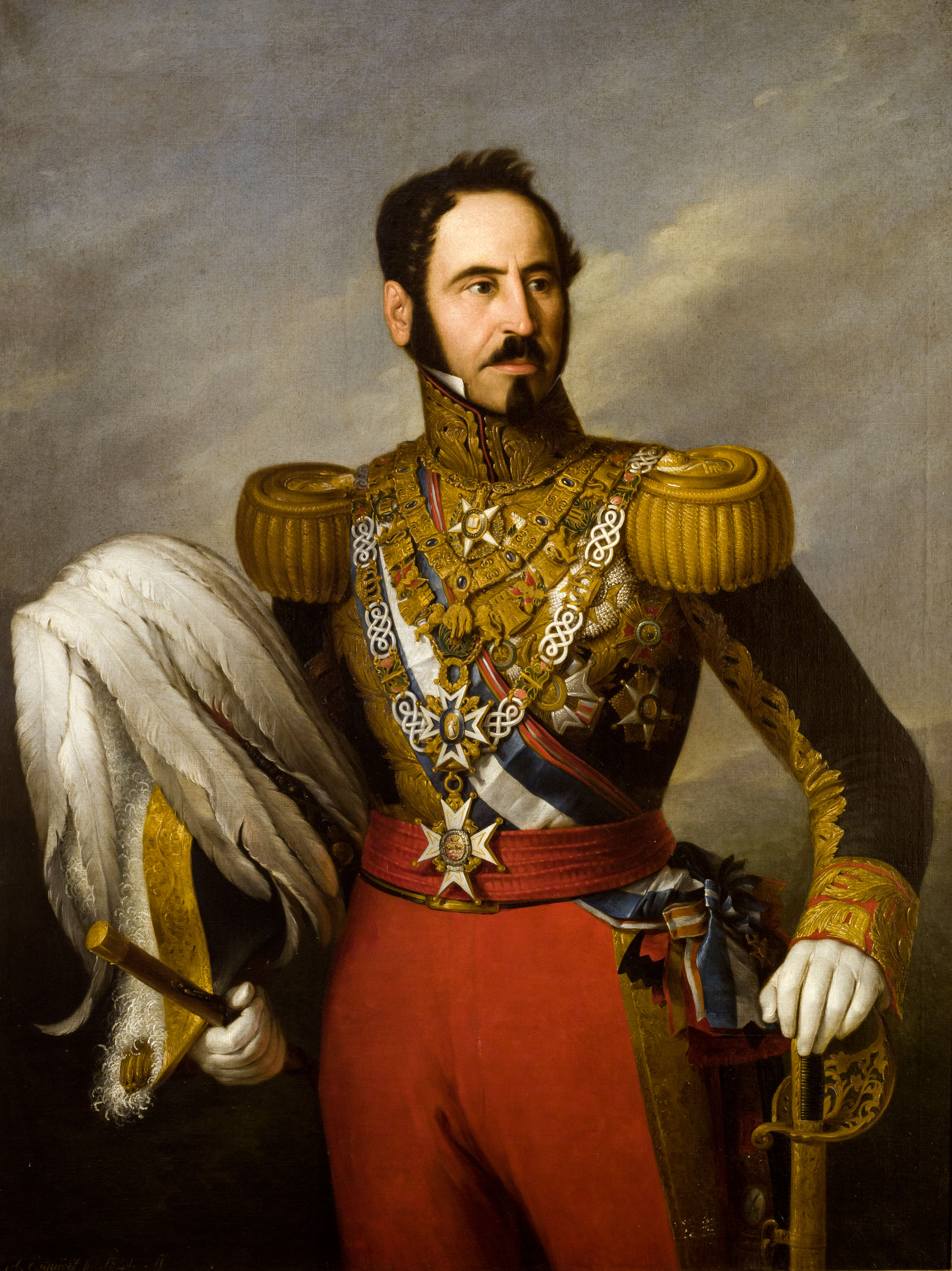
Espartero

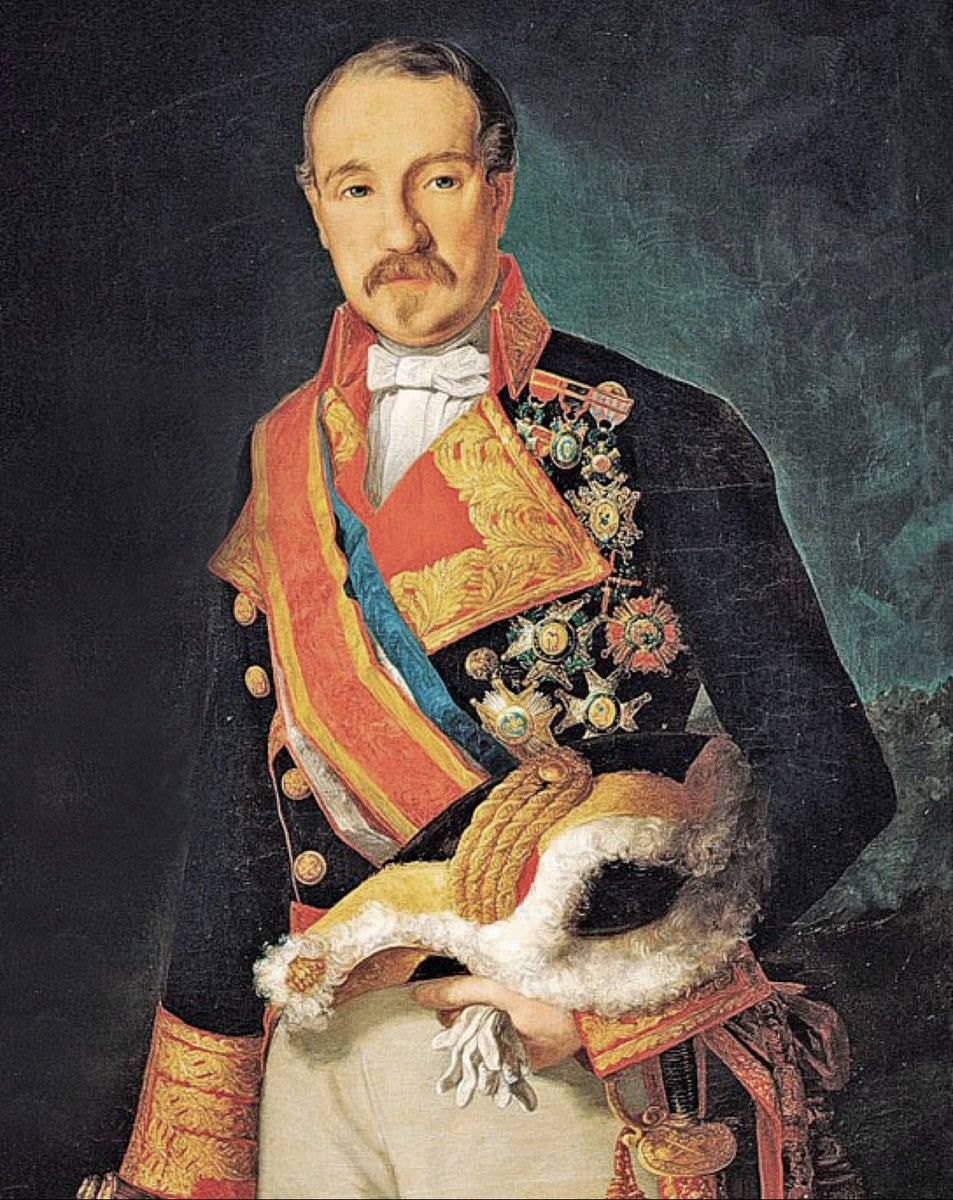
O'Donnell

== Bibliography ==
- Urquijo y Goitia, José Ramón de (1984). La revolución de 1854 en Madrid. Madrid: Instituto de Historia "Jerónimo Zurita."; CSIC. ISBN 84-00-05689-2.
- Vilches, Jorge (2001). Progreso y Libertad. El Partido Progresista en la Revolución Liberal Española. Madrid: Alianza Editorial. ISBN 84-206-6768-4.
- Fontana, Josep (2007). La época del liberalismo. Vol. 6 de la Historia de España, dirigida por Josep Fontana y Ramón Villares. Barcelona: Critica/Marcial Pons. ISBN 978-84-8432-876-6.
