= Alejandro Mon y Menéndez =

Spanish politician

The Most Excellent Alejandro Mon y Menéndez
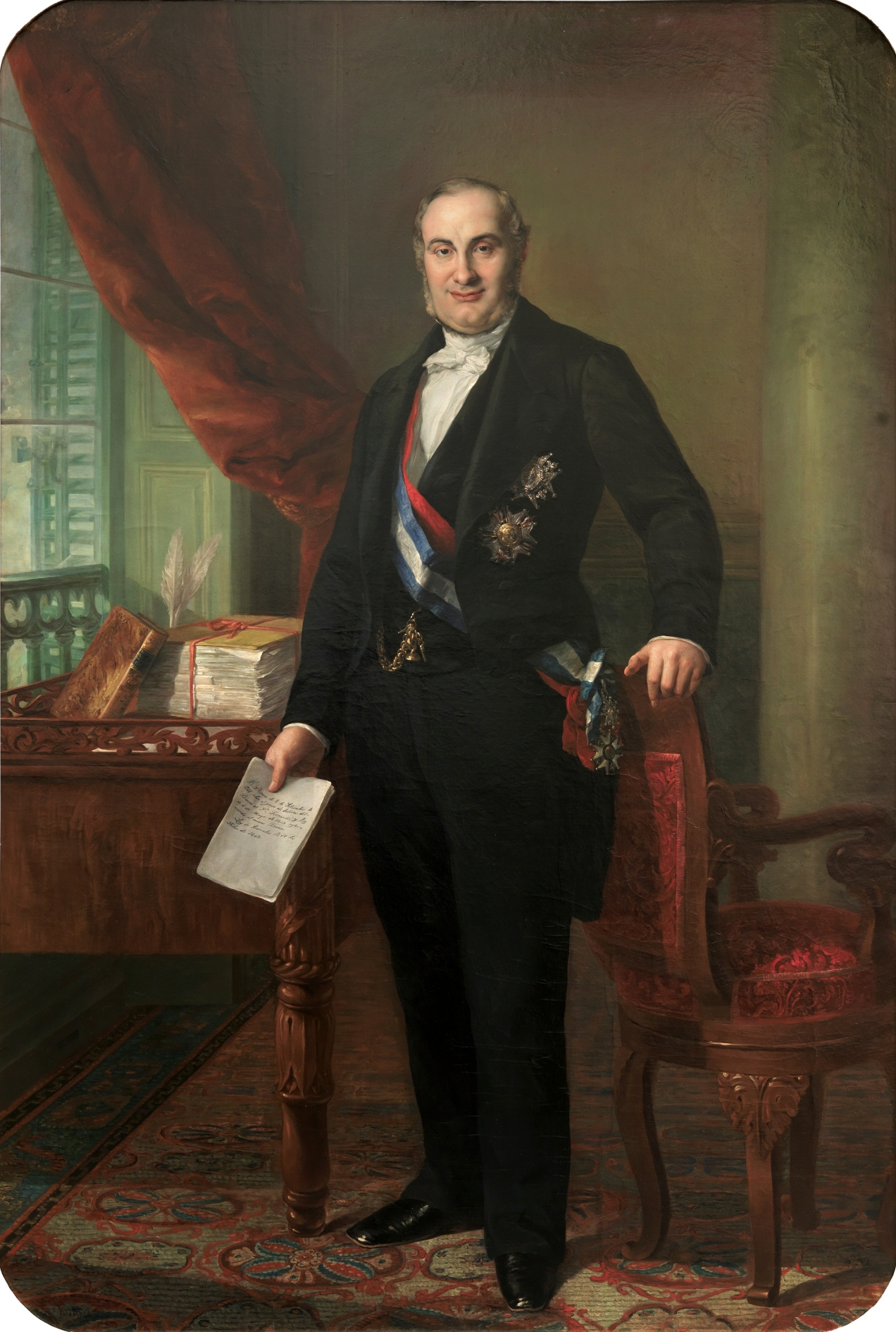

Prime Minister of Spain
- In office 1 March 1864 – 16 September 1864
- Monarch: Isabella II
- Preceded by: Lorenzo Arrazola
- Succeeded by: Ramon Maria Narvaez

Minister of Finance
- In office 25 October 1857 – 14 January 1858
- Monarch: Isabella II
- Preceded by: Manuel García Barzanallana
- Succeeded by: José Sánchez Ocaña
- In office 11 August 1848 – 19 August 1849
- Preceded by: The Count of the Romera
- Succeeded by: Juan Bravo Murillo
- In office 12 April 1846 – 28 January 1847
- Preceded by: Manuel María Sierra Moya
- Succeeded by: Ramón de Santillán
- In office 3 May 1844 – 12 February 1846
- Preceded by: The Count of Santa Olalla
- Succeeded by: Manuel María Sierra Moya
- In office 16 December 1837 – 6 September 1838
- Preceded by: Antonio María Seijas
- Succeeded by: The Marquess of Montevirgen

Personal details
- Born: 26 February 1801 Oviedo, Spain
- Died: 1 November 1882 (aged 81) Oviedo, Spain
- Party: Moderate Party
- Education: University of Oviedo

Alejandro Mon y Menéndez (26 February 1801 – 1 November 1882) was a Spanish politician and jurist who served as prime minister of Spain in 1864, during the reign of Queen Isabella II. He also served several times as minister of finance between 1837 and 1858 and president of the Congress of Deputies from 1847 to 1848.

== Early life ==
Mon was born in Oviedo, Principality of Asturias, and was the eldest son of Miguel Mon y Miranda and Francisca Menéndez y de la Torre. His only sister, Manuela, was married to Pedro José Pidal, 1st Marquess of Pidal, another prominent politician who served several times as Crown minister.

He studied law in the University of Oviedo, where he became interested in politics and approached the Moderate Party.

== Political career ==
In the regency of Queen Maria Christina of the Two Sicilies (1833–1840), Mon was appointed for his first high political office, minister of finance from 1837 to 1838, in a moderate cabinet headed by Narciso Fernández de Heredia, 2nd Count of Heredia-Spínola. During the regency of the progressivist Baldomero Espartero (1840–1843), he was in none of the cabinets but remained active in political life.

When the moderates came back to power in 1844, a period started known as the Moderate Decade, Mon was called by the new prime minister, Ramón María Narváez, 1st Duke of Valencia, again as minister of finance. He held this post from 1844 to 1845 and carried out the tax reform of 1845, which established the basis of the current tax system of Spain. It was executed in collaboration with Ramón de Santillán, and it is popularly known as the Mon-Santillán reform.

After the downfall of the moderates, the unionist Leopoldo O'Donnell, 1st Duke of Tetuan, offered him several ministerial portfolios, which he always declined. Mon preferred to be in posts away from the first line of political life, such as ambassador to the Holy See or to France. However, he returned to active politics in 1864, when he replaced Lorenzo Arrazola y García as prime minister, but his cabinet lasted only nine months because of the social and political instability. Five years later, the Spanish Glorious Revolution took place.

== Retirement ==
Mon lived long enough to see the reign of Amadeo I of Spain, the First Spanish Republic and finally the Restoration under Alfonso XII, which he supported as a personal friend of Antonio Cánovas del Castillo. However, he was not active politically during this period but kept only the honorary post of life senator. He retired to his home town, Oviedo, where he died in 1882.
