= Spanish Constitution of 1837 =

Former constitution of Spain

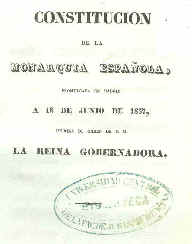
Cover of the Spanish Constitution of 1837.

The Spanish Constitution of 1837 was in effect from 1837 to 1845. Its principal legacy was to restore the most progressive features of the Spanish Constitution of 1812 and to entrench the concepts of constitutionalism, parliamentarism, and separation of powers in Spain.

Spain in the early 19th century was marked by political instability following the death of King Ferdinand VII in 1833. This period included the First Carlist War and ongoing conflict between liberal and conservative factions, which created pressure for constitutional reform.

== Development and characteristics ==
In 1836 a coup by sergeants of the Spanish Royal Guard at La Granja de San Ildefonso (Province of Segovia) obliged the regent Maria Christina of the Two Sicilies to name a government dominated by the Progressive Party. That government initially superseded the Royal Statute of 1834 by reinstating the Constitution of 1812 (the "Cádiz Constitution"), and called a Constituent Cortes that was also dominated by Progressives, to develop the new Constitution of 1837.

Despite this Progressive influence during its creation, the resulting constitution reflected a compromise between the Cádiz Constitution and the Royal Statute of 1834, in hopes of gaining support from the Moderate Party as well. Some of the similarities to the Cádiz Constitution were the principle of national sovereignty, the recognition of a range of rights for citizens, division of powers, an increased role for the Cortes (legislature) and limitations on royal power. On the other hand, the parliament (the Cortes) was similar in structure to that of France or Belgium at the time, with a broad electorate choosing a lower house (the Chamber of Deputies), while the upper house (the Senate) was appointed by the monarch. The monarch had the power to convoke and dissolve the Cortes. Rather than universal suffrage, a system of censitary suffrage limited the franchise to those who paid taxes of at least 200 reales, which is to say about five percent of the population.

In 1845, under the Moderates, Spain replaced the Constitution of 1837 with a new constitution; one of the main differences was that the Constitution of 1845 narrowed the franchise to a much smaller portion of the population. This change resulted in a more centralized system of government, with political participation limited to a smaller portion of the population. Compared to the Constitution of 1837, which attempted to balance progressive and moderate ideas, the 1845 Constitution reduced political participation and strengthened the authority of the monarchy.

== Response and popular reaction ==
The Constitution of 1837 was written during a difficult time in Spain. Progressive liberals supported it because it gave people more of a voice. On the other hand, more radical groups felt it did not go far enough to be fully democratic. Instead of bringing unity, it emphasized political division even further. Moderate and conservative elites were worried about these changes and saw them as a threat to stability due to the rise of local militias and more radical ideas. The Constitution ended up increasing tensions between different political groups instead of resolving them.
