= Spanish Constitution of 1845 =

Former constitution of Spain

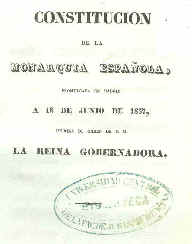
Frontispiece of the Spanish Constitution of 1837.

The Constitution of 1845 replaced the more liberal constitution established in 1837. Imposed by the Moderate Party when it took control of parliament, the Constitution of 1845 drastically constricted suffrage, among other changes.

While parliament ratified another new constitution in 1856 when Republicans regained control, it was never implemented due to a coup. The Constitution of 1845 thus remained in effect until 1869, when it was replaced by a constitution providing for a constitutional monarchy and other liberalizing provisions, following the Glorious Revolution of 1868.
