= Moderate Party (Spain) =

Defunct political party in 19th century Spain

Moderate Party Partido Moderado
- Leader: Fernando Fernández de Córdova (last)
- Founder: Francisco de Paula Martínez
- Founded: 1834
- Dissolved: 1874
- Merged into: Conservative Party
- Ideology: Conservative liberalism Economic liberalism Constitutional monarchy Centralism
- Political position: Center-right

The Moderate Party (Spanish: Partido Moderado) or Moderate Liberal Party (Spanish: Partido Liberal Moderado) was one of the two Spanish political parties that contended for power during the reign of Isabel II (reigned 1833–1868). Like the opposing Progressive Party (Spanish: Partido Progresista), it characterised itself as liberal and dynasticist; both parties supported Isabel against the claims of the Carlists.

The Moderates contained various factions. Some supported working with Progressives, but others sought closer ties with the Old Regime. However, the party's dominant ideology was adherence to the centrist juste milieu of the French Doctrinaires.

== Trajectory ==
The "moderates" or "liberal moderates" were a continuation of the doceañistas, supporters of the Spanish Constitution of 1812 during the Trienio Liberal ("liberal triennium") of 1820–1823, as opposed to the more radical exaltados or veinteañistas. In the last years of the reign of Ferdinand VII they had effected a mutual drawing together with the least absolutist elements of his government. Upon the death of Ferdinand, they supported the royal claim of the king's only child, the three-year-old Isabel, under the regency of queen mother Maria Christina of the Two Sicilies. In contrast, the Carlists supported a strongly absolutist monarchy, essentially a continuation of the Antiguo Régimen, under the Infante Carlos, Count of Molina.

The party was organized in 1834 during the governmental presidency of Francisco Martínez de la Rosa. After several years of progressivist domination, it held power continuously during the so-called Década moderada ("Moderate decade", 1843–1854) under the leadership of General Ramón María Narváez; after the bienio progresista ("progressivist biennium", 1853–1855) it returned to power allied with the Liberal Union (Spanish: Unión Liberal). After the Glorious Revolution of 1868 and the constitution of 1869 they failed to obtain representation in the new Cortes, and lost all power. When the monarchy was restored in 1874 following the First Spanish Republic, they united with the Liberal Union to form the Conservative Party under the direction of Antonio Cánovas del Castillo.

== Ideology ==
The party's political ideology of "Moderantism" (Spanish: moderantismo) is comparable to British conservatism and, especially, to French doctrinairism, from whom its ideologues (especially Juan Donoso Cortés) took part of their argumentation.

Their principal ideas were:

- Strong royal power
- Pure capitalism
- Domestic peace
- Total centralism, with all power emanating from Madrid.

== Support ==
The Moderate Party was supported by part of the Army (the moderate espadones such as General Narváez), landowners (a landowning oligarchy of traditional aristocrats and upper bourgeoisie, especially the large landowners owners, the latifundistas of Andalusia and the Meseta Central), and a portion of the middle class (the so-called gente de orden "people of order"). Economically the party tended to support free trade, allowing the export of agricultural surplus, a policy compatible with the interests of its social base. Electorally, they defended limited suffrage, in particular sufragio censitario, "census suffrage" that limited the electoral census to the wealthy, only those who owned a certain amount of property or paid a certain amount of taxes.

Once Carlism had been defeated militarily, the 1839 Convention of Vergara that put an end to the war allowed some of the more moderate Carlists to join the party or to support it from without. Similarly, after the Concordat of 1851 the party gained the support of much of the clergy, although the so-called neocatólicos ("neo-Catholics") remained outside and still nurtured hopes of a Carlist restoration.

== See also ==
- Parties and factions in Isabelline Spain
