= 1869 Spanish general election =

- 15–18 January 1869 27–30 January 1869 (Canary Islands); 30 May – 1 June 1869 (Puerto Rico)

All 381 seats in the Constituent Cortes (Note: Elections in Cuba were indefinitely postponed due to the outbreak of the Ten Years' War, resulting in the vacancy of the 18 seats allocated to the island.) 191 seats needed for a majority
- Registered: 3,798,284
- Turnout: 2,943,460 (77.5%)
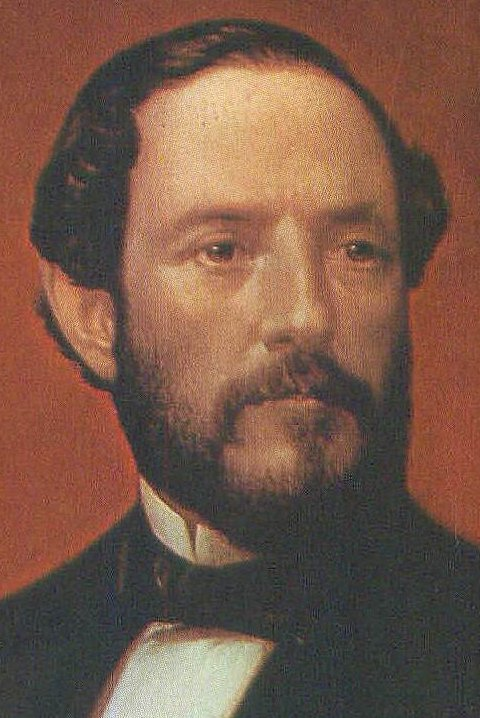

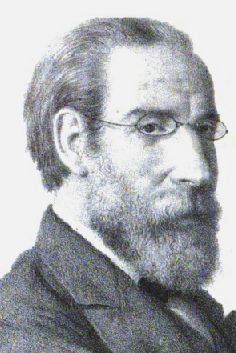

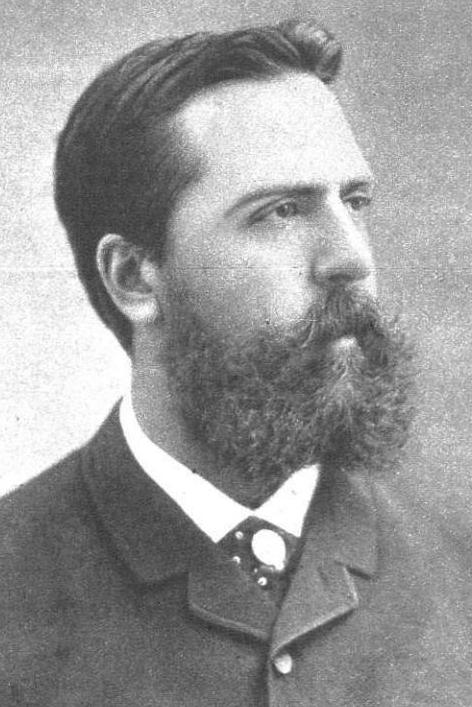
	First party	Second party	Third party
Leader	Juan Prim	Francesc Pi i Margall	Carlos, Duke of Madrid
Party	Monarchist–Democratic	Republican	Carlist
Leader's seat	Madrid	Barcelona	—
Seats won	259	69	23
Popular vote	8,743,286	2,987,398	1,090,254
Percentage	65.0%	22.2%	8.1%
Prime Minister before election
Francisco Serrano
Liberal Union
Prime Minister after election
Francisco Serrano
Liberal Union

A general election was held in Spain from 15 to 18 January 1869 to elect the members of the Constituent Cortes in the Democratic Sexennium period. 363 of 381 seats in the Cortes were up for election. In the Canary Islands the election was held from 27 to 30 January, in Puerto Rico it was held from 30 May to 1 June, and in Cuba it was indefinitely postponed.

The election was the first to be held following the Glorious Revolution in September 1868, which had resulted in the overthrow of the Moderate Party from power and the exile of Queen Isabella II. A provisional government under Francisco Serrano, supported by the Progressive Party, the Liberal Union and elements from the Democratic Party, was formed to organize an election to Constituent Cortes, aiming at replacing the Spanish Constitution of 1845 with a new constitution.

== Background ==
The Glorious Revolution in Spain in September 1868, marking the starting point of the Democratic Sexennium, had led to the overthrow of the Moderate Party's government and the exile of Queen Isabella II, with the revolutionaries aiming for a reform of the Isabelline political system through a constituent assembly elected by universal suffrage. With the purpose of organizing this election, the Progressive Party and the Liberal Union formed a provisional government led by Francisco Serrano, Duke of la Torre, running together as part of the Monarchist–Democratic Coalition that aimed for the establishment of a "democratic monarchy". Public enthusiasm after the revolution saw favourable conditions for a relatively free and fair election, with the government not needing to resort to electoral fraud to provide itself with a parliamentary majority.

As for the Democratic Party, following several assemblies held between October and November 1868, it decided to withdraw its support for the government after concluding that the provisions of the Pact of Ostend had been fulfilled, advocate for the establishment of a federal republic and re-establish itself as the Federal Democratic Republican Party (PRDF). A faction of the party opposed this decision and decided to opt for the "democratic monarchy" proposed by the government, becoming popularly known as the Cimbrios and joining the government's ticket. One of the factors that most helped the popularization of the PRDF in the country's urban areas would be its opposition to the consumption taxes—established in 19th-century Spain and taxing essential goods—and the quintas, a system of forced recruitment of young people into the Spanish Army which saw wealthier families being able to "exempt" their offspring from military service by paying a fee (the redención en metálico or "cash redemption") or by hiring a replacement ("substitution"). Many had hoped these would be abolished with the success of the Revolution and felt betrayed by the government's decision to uphold them.

The Carlist movement only became established as a political party in the Revolution of 1868, having previously preferred military procedures; as a result the Catholic–Monarchist Communion was formed to participate in the election, although still subordinated to the Royal Carlist Armies.

== Overview ==
Under the Pact of Ostend and the Cádiz Manifestos, the Spanish Cortes were conceived as a constituent assembly tasked with drafting a new constitution that would replace the legal framework of the Isabelline period.

=== Date ===
Election day was held over four voting days: the first was used to elect polling station officials, and the remaining three were devoted to the parliamentary election itself.

The election to the Constituent Cortes was officially called on 6 December 1868, with the corresponding decree setting election day for between 15 and 18 January 1869 in most of the country and from 27 to 30 January in the Canary Islands, scheduling for the chamber to reconvene on 11 February. The publication of the election decree for Puerto Rico was delayed until 30 April, setting election day in the island for between 30 May and 1 June. In Cuba, elections were postponed due to the outbreak of the Ten Years' War.

=== Electoral system ===
Voting for the Cortes was based on universal manhood suffrage, comprising all Spanish national males over 25 years of age and registered in the census. In the Spanish West Indies, voting was based on censitary suffrage, comprising Spanish males of voting age, with full civil rights, who met either of the following:

- Being taxpayers with a minimum quota of 50 escudos in property or corporate taxes;
- Holding specific positions (members of scientific and literary corporations or economic societies of Friends of the Country; doctors and graduates; ordained ministers; active and retired public employees; general officers, awarded painters or sculptors, senior court officials; industrial and commercial managers; certified teachers);

Additional restrictions excluded those deprived of political rights or barred from public office by a final sentence, criminally imprisoned or convicted, legally incapacitated, bankrupt, and public debtors.

The Constituent Cortes had one seat per 45,000 inhabitants or fraction above 22,500. All were elected in multi-member constituencies corresponding to the provinces of Spain—each assigned a number of seats according to population—using plurality voting. Provinces electing six to ten seats were divided into two sub-provincial constituencies, and those electing above ten into three (with the exception of the Balearics and the Canary Islands, which were divided according to their particular circumstances). Cuba and Puerto Rico were allocated 18 and 11 seats, respectively.

As a result of the aforementioned allocation, each Cortes multi-member constituency (a total of 88) was entitled the following seats:

Seats	Constituencies
7	Havana, Madrid
6	Avilés, Barcelona, Castellón, Ciudad Real, Coruña, Huesca, Játiva, Matanzas, Oviedo, Salamanca, Santiago, Zamora
5	Albacete, Alicante, Badajoz, Cuenca, Granada, Guadalajara, Manresa, Motril, Murcia, Pontevedra, Santander, Santiago de Cuba, Seville, Teruel, Valladolid, Vich, Vigo, Zaragoza
4	Alcalá, Alcoy, Almería, Astorga, Ávila, Baeza, Bilbao, Burgos, Cáceres, Cádiz, Calatayud, Castuera, Córdoba, Gerona, Ginzo de Limia, Huelva, Jaén, León, Lérida, Liria, Lorca, Logroño, Lugo, Mayagüez, Mondoñedo, Montilla, Orense, Palencia, Palma, Pamplona, Ronda, San Juan Bautista, San Sebastián, Tarragona, Toledo, Valencia
3	Antequera, Arecibo, Briviesca, Écija, Estella, Huercalovera, Jerez, Málaga, Morón, Ocaña, Olot, Plasencia, Santa Cruz de Tenerife, Segovia, Seo de Urgel, Soria, Tortosa
2	Álava, Las Palmas, Mahón

The law provided for by-elections to fill vacant seats during the legislative term, as long as this affected at least one third of the seats assigned to a given province.

== Candidates ==
=== Nomination rules ===
Spanish males with the right to vote could run for election. Causes of ineligibility applied to holders of government-appointed posts within their areas of jurisdiction, except for those serving in the province of Madrid with limited authority. Additionally in the Spanish West Indies, ineligibility extended to those convicted of slave trade crimes, but not to local mayors and deputy mayors.

Incompatibility rules barred representing multiple constituencies simultaneously, as well as combining the role of deputy with any civil, military or overseas post based outside Madrid.

== Results ==
=== Overall ===
← Summary of the 15–18 January 1869 (Note: In the Canary Islands, the election was held from 27 to 30 January 1869. In Puerto Rico, it was held from 30 May to 1 June 1869.) Constituent Cortes election results →
Parties and alliances	Popular vote		Seats	
Parties and alliances	Votes	%	Total	+/−
Monarchist–Democratic Coalition (P–UL–D)	8,743,286	64.97	259	
Progressive Party (PP)	4,277,504	31.79	133	
Liberal Union (UL)	2,924,925	21.74	96	
Democratic Party (PD)	741,505	5.51	27	
Others	799,352	5.94	3	
Federal Democratic Republican Party (PRDF)	2,987,398	22.20	69	
Catholic–Monarchist Communion (CMC)	1,090,254	8.10	23	
Moderate Party (PM)	220,111	1.64	1	
Independent Conservatives (CON.IND)	5,653	0.04	7	
Independent Liberals (L.IND)	3,661	0.03	4	
Independents (INDEP)	119,934	0.89	0	
Vacant			18	
Others	286,550	2.13	0	
Total	13,456,847		381	
Votes cast / turnout	2,943,460	77.49		
Abstentions	853,686	22.51		
Registered voters	3,798,284			

Popular vote
M–D	64.97%
PRDF	22.20%
CMC	8.10%
PM	1.64%
CON.IND	0.04%
L.IND	0.03%
INDEP	0.89%
Others	2.13%

Seats
M–D	67.98%
PRDF	18.11%
CMC	6.04%
CON.IND	1.84%
L.IND	1.05%
PM	0.26%
Vacant	4.72%

=== By province ===
Summary of provincial results in the 15–18 January 1869 Constituent Cortes election
Province	M–D		PRDF		CMC		PM		CON.IND		L.IND		Vacant	
Province	%	S	%	S	%	S	%	S	%	S	%	S	%	S
Álava	0.2	−	4.0	−	88.5	2								
Albacete	83.7	5	11.5	−			3.1	−						
Alicante	64.7	6	32.8	3										
Almería	85.5	7	11.1	−	1.2	−								
Ávila	78.5	4	9.2	−	3.7	−	1.0	−						
Badajoz	73.5	8	20.7	1	1.6	−								
Balearics	67.1	6	24.5	−			4.7	−						
Barcelona	39.8	7	44.0	8	14.3	1								
Biscay	16.5	−	1.0	−	82.5	4								
Burgos	71.4	6	1.8	−	4.3	−	18.8	1						
Cáceres	67.6	7	28.2	−	0.3	−								
Cádiz	36.6	−	60.7	9										
Canaries	84.0	5	13.4	−										
Castellón	56.6	6	26.0	−	14.7	−	1.4	−						
Ciudad Real	68.8	5	16.3	−	9.1	1	3.2	−						
Córdoba	74.5	8	19.5	−	1.4	−	0.3	−						
Cuenca	75.0	5	1.2	−	8.1	−	12.3	−						
Gerona	29.2	1	42.9	4	27.8	2								
Granada	73.5	8	17.3	2	6.0	−	1.0	−						
Guadalajara	68.8	4	8.1	1	14.6	−	6.9	−						
Guipúzcoa	32.6	−			67.2	4								
Havana													—N/a	7
Huelva	66.5	3	32.5	1	0.4	−								
Huesca	50.8	1	48.3	5										
Jaén	74.9	8	20.7	−										
La Coruña	85.9	12	5.6	−	1.2	−	0.1	−						
León	74.1	7	9.4	1	1.6	−	6.9	−						
Lérida	25.5	−	61.6	7	9.5	−	3.2	−						
Logroño	82.1	4	13.1	−			0.4	−						
Lugo	95.7	10	2.1	−			0.1	−						
Madrid	68.5	11	22.8	−	2.2	−	1.4	−						
Málaga	64.7	8	33.6	2	0.0	−								
Matanzas													—N/a	6
Murcia	72.6	7	25.5	2										
Navarre	24.2	1	0.6	−	74.5	6								
Orense	77.6	7	19.2	1			0.7	−						
Oviedo	61.8	10	7.8	−	22.1	2	3.9	−						
Palencia	64.6	3	13.6	1	20.4	−								
Pontevedra	94.4	10	4.9	−										
Puerto Rico									57.4	7	37.2	4		
Salamanca	48.5	4	25.2	1	21.2	1								
Santander	72.2	5	10.8	−	12.1	−	1.6	−						
Santiago de Cuba													—N/a	5
Segovia	78.1	3	0.7	−	17.3	−								
Seville	45.4	2	53.4	9										
Soria	67.2	3	2.9	−	27.5	−								
Tarragona	52.5	5	44.0	2	2.0	−								
Teruel	62.7	5	36.6	−										
Toledo	77.3	6	14.3	1	0.7	−	3.7	−						
Valencia	59.8	10	30.0	4	8.3	−	1.1	−						
Valladolid	66.5	5	18.4	−	9.4	−								
Zamora	86.8	6			1.9	−	5.8	−						
Zaragoza	50.8	5	42.9	4			1.7	−						
Total	65.0	259	22.2	69	8.1	23	1.6	1	0.0	7	0.0	4	—N/a	18

== Bibliography ==
Legislation

- Decreto sobre el ejercicio del sufragio universal (PDF) (Decree). Madrid Gazette (in Spanish). 9 November 1868.
- Decreto convocando Cortes Constituyentes y señalando los días en que se ha de proceder a la elección de los Diputados para las mismas (PDF) (Decree). Madrid Gazette (in Spanish). 6 December 1868.
- Decreto electoral para Diputados a Cortes Constituyentes en las provincias de Cuba y Puerto Rico (PDF) (Decree). Madrid Gazette (in Spanish). 14 December 1868.
- Decreto dictando varias reglas para el ejercicio del sufragio universal (PDF) (Decree). Madrid Gazette (in Spanish). 30 December 1868.

Other

- Ferrer Dalmau, Melchor (1941). Historia del Tradicionalismo Español (in Spanish). Vol. 23. Seville: Editorial Católica Española.
- Fernández Almagro, Melchor (1943). "Las Cortes del siglo XIX y la práctica electoral" (PDF). Revista de Estudios Políticos (in Spanish) (9–10). Madrid: Centre for Political and Constitutional Studies: 383–419. ISSN 0048-7694.
- Martínez Cuadrado, Miguel (1963). "La elección general para Cortes Constituyentes de 1869". Revista de Estudios Políticos (in Spanish) (132): 65–102. ISSN 0048-7694.
- López Domínguez, José María (1976). Elecciones y partidos políticos de Puerto Rico: 1809-1898 (PDF) (Thesis) (in Spanish). Vol. 1. Puerto Rico: Complutense University of Madrid.
- Ortega Álvarez, Luis; Santaolaya Machetti, Pablo (1996). "Evolución histórica del sistema electoral español". Revista de las Cortes Generales (in Spanish). 37. Cortes Generales: 65–107. doi:10.33426/rcg/1996/37/784. ISSN 0213-0130.
- Roldán de Montaud, Inés (1999). "Política y elecciones en Cuba durante la restauración" (PDF). Revista de Estudios Políticos (in Spanish) (104): 245–287.
- Vilches, Jorge (2001). Progreso y libertad: el Partido Progresista en la revolución liberal española (in Spanish). Madrid: Alianza Editorial. ISBN 8420667684.
- Carreras de Odriozola, Albert; Tafunell Sambola, Xavier (2005) [1989]. Estadísticas históricas de España, siglos XIX-XX (PDF) (in Spanish). Vol. 1 (II ed.). Bilbao: Fundación BBVA. pp. 1072–1097. ISBN 84-96515-00-1. Archived from the original (PDF) on 24 September 2015.
- Fontana, Josep; Villares, Ramón (2007). "La época del liberalismo". Historia de España (in Spanish). Vol. 6. Barcelona: Crítica/Marcial Pons. ISBN 9788498928075.
- Duarte Montserrat, Ángel (2013). El republicanismo. Una pasión política (in Spanish). Madrid: Ediciones Cátedra. ISBN 9788437631325.
- De la Fuente Monge, Gregorio (2020). "Las elecciones democráticas a Cortes Constituyentes de 1869". Memoria y Civilización (in Spanish). 23. Madrid: University of Navarre: 87–125. doi:10.15581/001.23.008. hdl:10171/61284.
