= Manuel Becerra Bermúdez =

Spanish politician, mathematician and revolutionary

Manuel Becerra
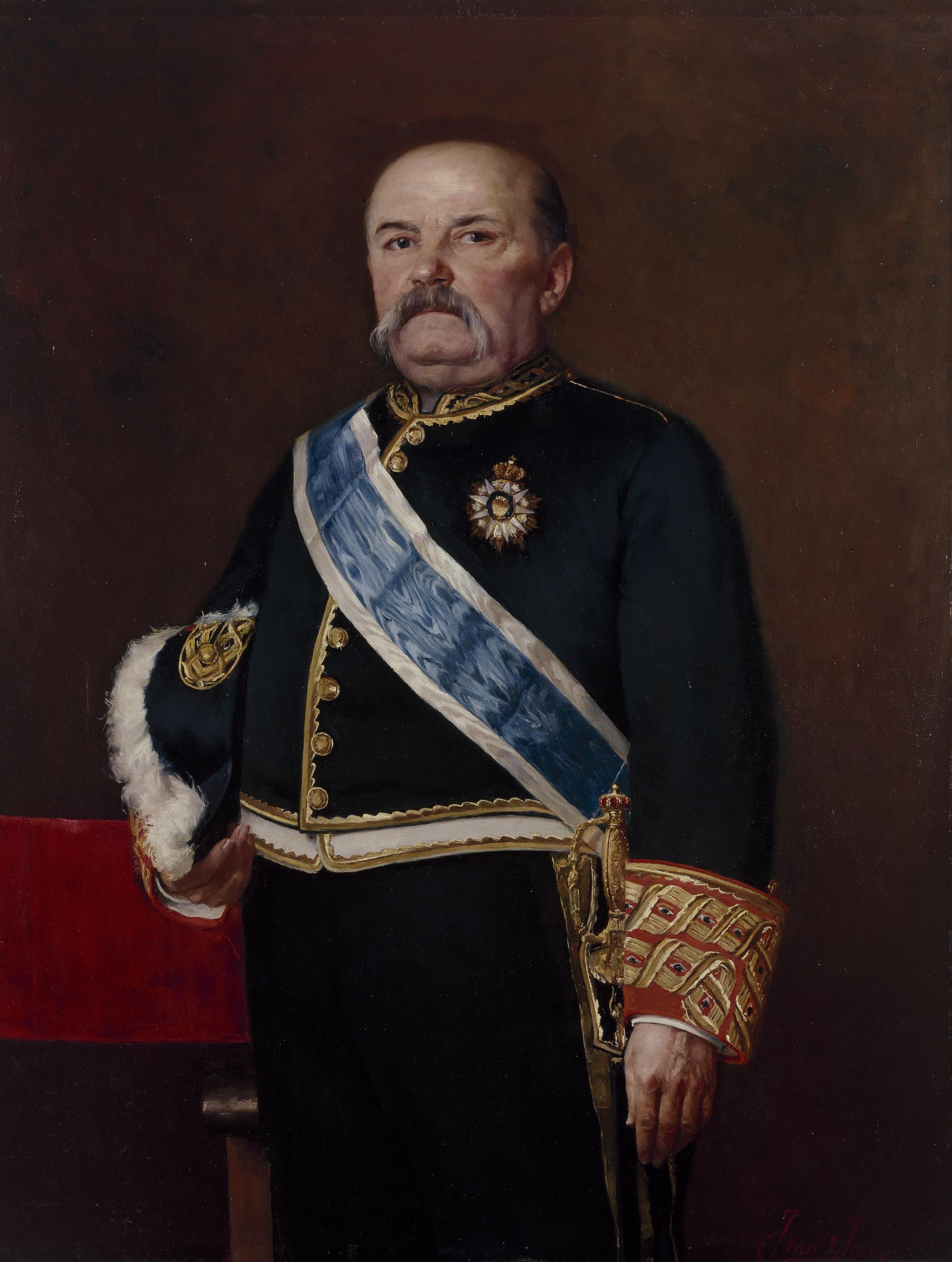
- Portrait by Francisco Jover y Casanova, 1888

Personal details
- Born: 20 October 1820 Santa María del Otero, Castro de Rey, Spain
- Died: 19 December 1896 (aged 76) Madrid, Spain
- Party: Democratic Party; Liberal Fusionist Party; Dynastic Left
- Occupation: Politician, math teacher, revolutionary, academic

Manuel Becerra Bermúdez (20 October 1820 – 19 December 1896) was a Spanish politician, mathematician and revolutionary. A Republican who would later embrace monarchism, he went on to assume the ministerial portfolios of Overseas and Development during the Sexenio Democrático, returning for two additional spells as Overseas minister during the regency of Maria Christina of Austria.

== Biography ==
=== Early life and revolutionary activity ===
Born in Santa María del Otero, Castro de Rey, province of Lugo, on 20 October 1820. Son to a math teacher, he did not complete studies in Engineering. He received however substantial teaching in Mathematics, Physics and Astronomy from José de Subercase and founded a reputed Academy of Mathematics in Madrid.

A defender of Republicanism in his early life, he took part in the 1848 Revolution, One of the founders of the Democratic–Progressive Party (best known as Democratic Party) in 1849, he also took part in the 1854 revolts, battling in the streets of Madrid, being arrested and imprisoned at El Saladero. Following the 1856 counter-revolutionary involution by O'Donnell, Becerra entered in combat in the Plaza de Santo Domingo at the helm of a light battalion of the National Militia trying to defend the Constitutional liberties side by side Sixto Cámara against a battalion of Jägers sent by O'Donnell, and was forced to exile. He would endorse the June 1866 Cuartel de San Gil uprising (for which he was sentenced to death by garrote for rebellion). Forced again to exile, he was one of the endorsers of the 16 August 1866 Pact of Ostend becoming (as representative of the democrats) one of the three legs of the coordination of the revolutionary action along Juan Prim and Joaquín Aguirre (representative of the progressives), that aimed towards the overthrow of Isabella II and the call of Constituent Cortes elected by universal suffrage.

=== Sexenio democrático ===
After the 1868 Glorious Revolution, Becerra became a member of the Junta Superior Revolucionaria. Along Nicolás María Rivero and Cristino Martos he would become one of the leaders of the so-called cimbrios, the monarchist democrats part of the 1868–1871 Provisional Government.

In July 1869, during the Regency of Marshal Serrano, he was appointed as Minister of Overseas. A founding member of the Spanish Abolitionist Society back in 1864, he took measures during his first ministerial tenure towards the abolition of slavery in Puerto Rico, presenting two proposals in 1869, which were not welcomed either by his cabinet peers or from the parliament. After months of fierce resistance to the ministerial initiatives from pro-slavery legislators such as Antonio Cánovas del Castillo or Francisco Romero Robledo, Becerra was forced to resign in March 1870 amid intense pressure.

Already entered the reign of Amadeo, during the premiership of Manuel Ruiz Zorrilla, Becerra was appointed as Minister of Development in December 1872, replacing José Echegaray. On 11 February 1873, in a vote at the Cortes during the same session in which the declaration of the First Republic was proclaimed, he was confirmed as Minister of Development (with 266 votes in favour). He would however leave the ministry by late February.

=== Bourbon Restoration and later life ===
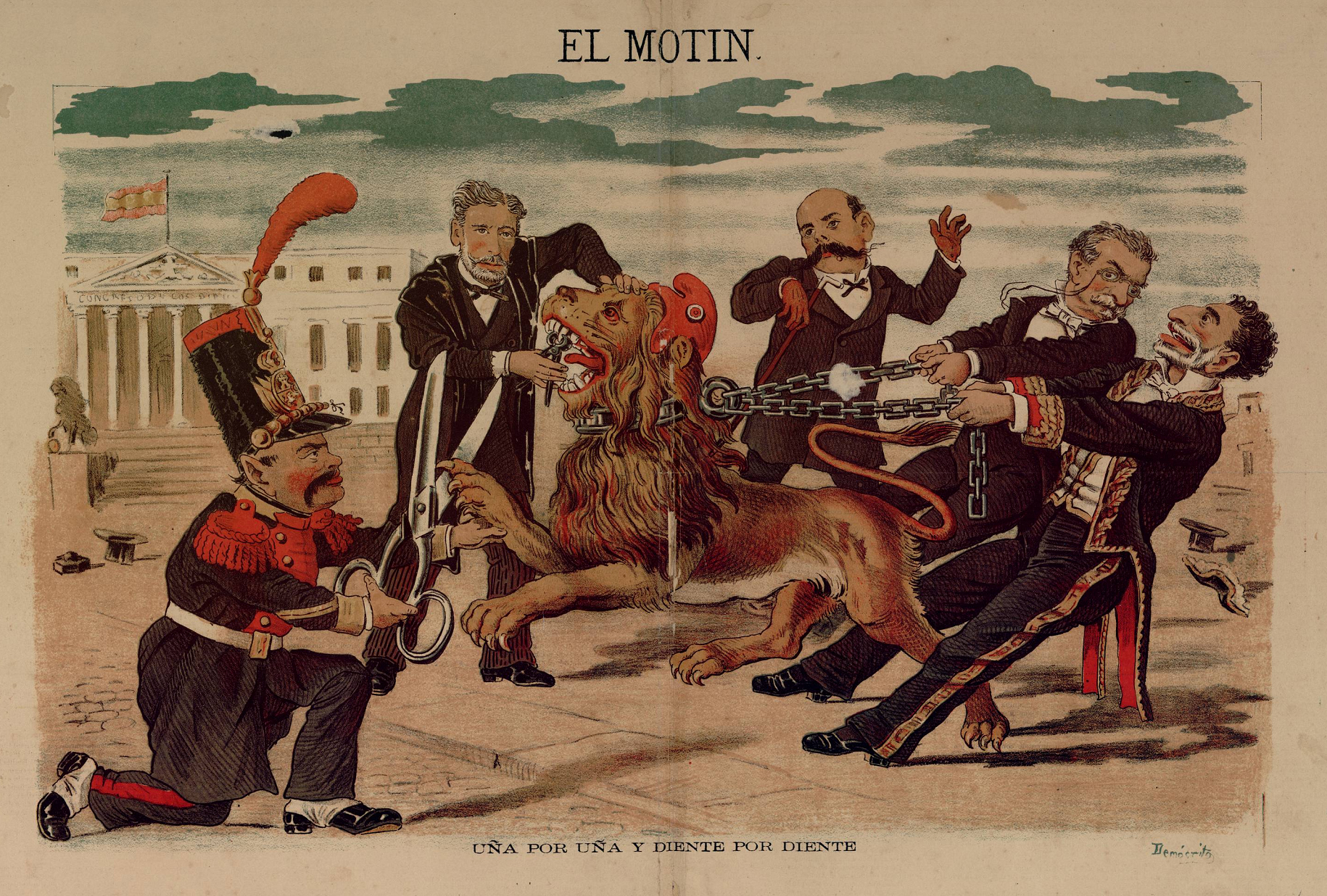
Political cartoon depicting Becerra (in the company of Montero Ríos, Castelar, Cánovas, and Sagasta) trimming the nails of a lion that is wearing a (Republican) Phrygian cap (Demócrito, 1881).

Following the Bourbon Restoration, Becerra joined the Liberal Fusionist Party led by Práxedes Mateo Sagasta as part of its left-leaning faction. He left the fusionists in 1881 to create along Segismundo Moret, Eugenio Montero Ríos and José López Domínguez the Dynastic Left.

An initiated Freemason (symbol: Fortaleza; grade: 33), Becerra was chosen as Grand Master of the Grand Orient of Spain in 1884; after his departure from the post in 1886, the organization was thrown into chaos and divided into factions.

Elected to the Royal Academy of Sciences in 1885, he took office as numerary member (Medal #36) on 18 November 1886, reading a discourse titled Evolución de la Matemática e influencia que en los progresos de esta ciencia ejerció la civilización árabe ("Evolution of Mathematics and the influence of the Arab civilization on the progress of this science"), replied by Eduardo Saavedra.

Becerra returned to the ministry of Overseas in two occasions: from December 1888 to January 1890 and from March 1894 to November 1894, as part of cabinets presided by Sagasta.

He died on 19 December 1896 at his address in the Plaza del Cordón in Madrid; he was apparently drinking a glass of milk, and, as it slipped out of his hand, after a sigh, he died. He was buried at the Sacramental de San Lorenzo on the next day.

Party political offices
Preceded by Juan Bautista Topete	Minister of Overseas; 1869–1870	Succeeded by Segismundo Moret
Preceded by José Echegaray	Minister of Development; 1872–1873	Succeeded by Eduardo Chao
Preceded by Trinitario Ruiz Capdepón	Minister of Overseas; 1888–1890	Succeeded by Antonio María Fabié
Preceded by Antonio Maura	Minister of Overseas; 1894	Succeeded by Buenaventura Abárzuza y Ferrer
Masonic offices
Preceded by Antonio Romero Ortiz	Grand Master of the Grand Orient of Spain; 1884–1886	Succeeded by
Academic offices
Preceded by José Subercase y Jiménez	Medal #36 of the Royal Academy of Sciences; 1886–1896	Succeeded by Vicente Ventosa Martínez de Velasco
