= Monarchist–Democratic Coalition =

Monarchist–Democratic Coalition Coalición Monárquico–Democrática
- Leader: Juan Prim; Francisco Serrano
- Founded: November 1868
- Dissolved: June 1871
- Ideology: Liberalism; Monarchism

The Monarchist–Democratic Coalition (Spanish: Coalición Monárquico–Democrática) was an electoral alliance and governing coalition in Spain, established in November 1868 by the Progressive Party, the Liberal Union and the Cimbrios Democrats, to support the provisional government formed in the wake of the Glorious Revolution by Juan Prim and Francisco Serrano. It secured a parliamentary majority in the 1869 general election that allowed it to draft the Spanish Constitution of 1869. It was disestablished in June 1871, following Prim's assassination in December 1870, Amadeo I's swearing-in as King of Spain in January 1871 and the general election held in March.

== Bibliography ==
- De la Fuente Monge, Gregorio (2020). "Las elecciones democráticas a Cortes Constituyentes de 1869". Memoria y Civilización (in Spanish). 23. Madrid: University of Navarre: 87–125. doi:10.15581/001.23.008. hdl:10171/61284.
