= 1871 Spanish general election =

- 8–11 March 1871 8–15 March 1871 (Canary Islands); 20–23 June 1871 (Puerto Rico)

All 424 seats in the Congress of Deputies (Note: Elections in Cuba were indefinitely postponed due to the outbreak of the Ten Years' War, resulting in the vacancy of the 18 seats allocated to the island.) and all 200 seats in the Senate 213 seats needed for a majority in the Congress and 101 in the Senate
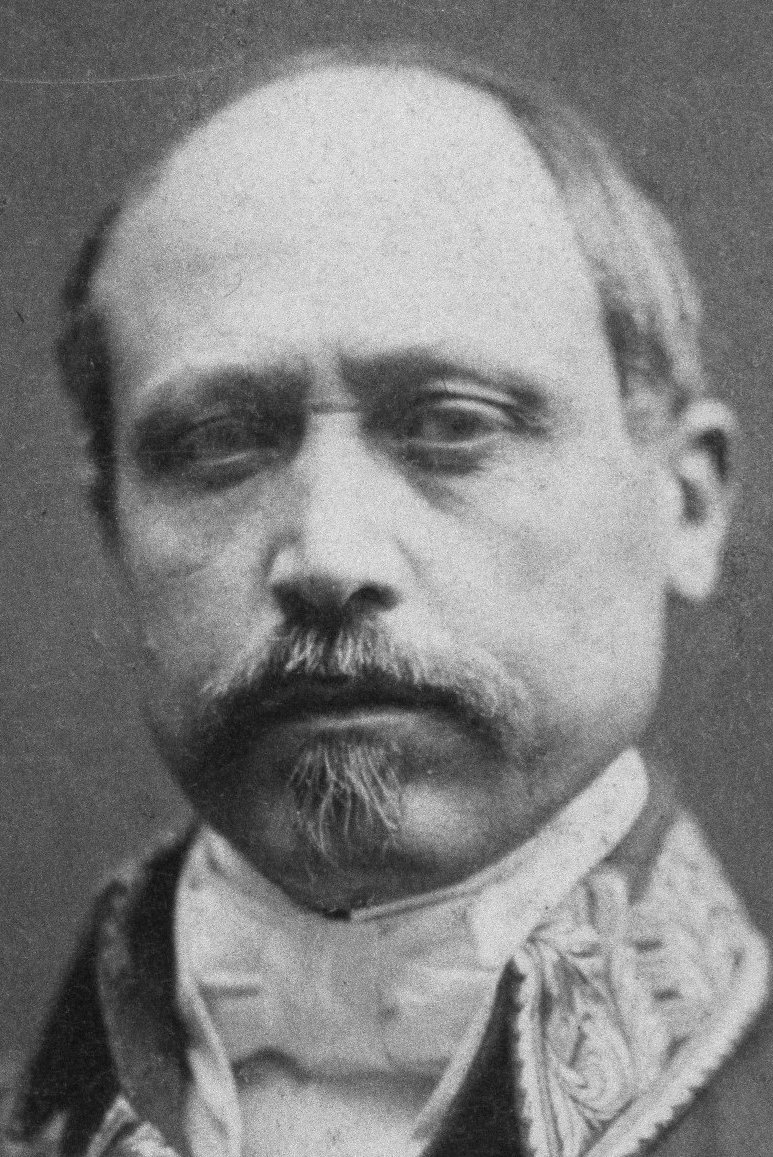

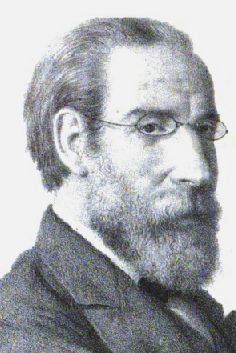

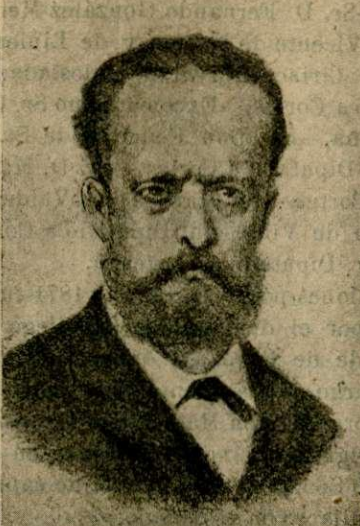

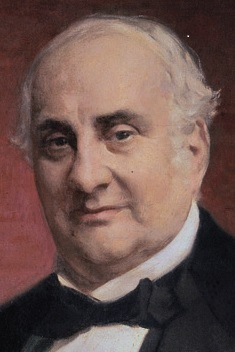

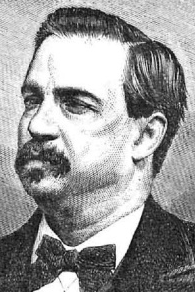

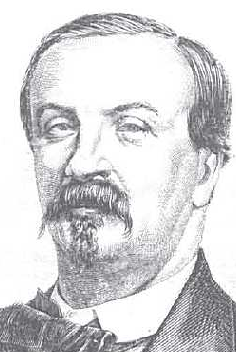
	First party	Second party	Third party
Leader	Francisco Serrano	Francesc Pi i Margall	Agustín Crespí de Valldaura
Party	Monarchist–Democratic	Republican	Carlist
Leader's seat	Jaén	Barcelona IV	Villadiego
Seats won	235	52	51
Seat change	▼24	▼17	▲28
	Fourth party	Fifth party	Sixth party
Leader	Alejandro Mon y Menéndez	Antonio Cánovas del Castillo	Duke of Montpensier
Party	Moderate	Alfonsist	Montpensierist
Leader's seat	Oviedo (lost)	Cieza	San Fernando
Seats won	18	9	7
Seat change	▲17	New	New
Prime Minister before election
Francisco Serrano
Liberal Union
Prime Minister after election
Francisco Serrano
Liberal Union

A general election was held in Spain from 8 to 11 March 1871 to elect the members of the 1st Cortes under the Spanish Constitution of 1869, during the Democratic Sexennium period. 406 of 424 seats in the Congress of Deputies and all 200 seats in the Senate were up for election. In the Canary Islands the election was held until 15 March, in Puerto Rico it was held from 20 to 23 June, and in Cuba it was indefinitely postponed.

The election was held following the promulgation of the 1869 Constitution and the swearing-in of Amadeo I as King of Spain on 2 January 1871. Francisco Serrano, a member of the Liberal Union (part of the ruling Monarchist–Democratic Coalition together with the Progressive Party and the Cimbrios Democrats), was the prime minister before the election.

== Background ==
Following the approval and promulgation of the Spanish Constitution of 1869, which enshrined Spain as a constitutional monarchy, the Constituent Cortes searched for a suitable candidate from a new dynasty to replace the House of Bourbon, with Francisco Serrano serving as regent and Juan Prim as prime minister in the meantime.

Prince Amadeo of Savoy was chosen as new King of Spain on 16 November 1870 and sworn-in as Amadeo I on 2 January 1871, but Prim's assassination on 27 December left Amadeo without his proponent and main supporter. A new coalition cabinet formed by the Liberal Union, the Progressive Party and the Cimbrios Democrats was formed by Serrano, who called a snap election as a show of legitimacy for the new monarch, whose foreign origins made him unpopular with the general populace. In order to ensure the victory of the Monarchist–Democratic Coalition, Serrano reinstated first-past-the-post voting, which made it easier for the government to use electoral fraud in rural districts. Voters were required to present an "electoral card" (cédula electoral) that mayors were entitled to award to its constituents; as most of these were aligned with the governing coalition, they could refuse awarding the card to voters that were hostile to the government. They also employed voter intimidation tactics through the partida de la porra aligned to the Progressive Party, to violently attack opponents.

The enthronement of Amadeo I led to the Federal Democratic Republican Party (PRDF) splitting into two factions: the "benevolent" (benevolentes), who aimed at deposing Amadeo through legal means, and the "intransigent" (intransigentes), who dubbed the system as illegitimate and chose to abstain from electoral participation, advocating instead for the proclamation of a "federal republic from below" through violent insurrection. For Carlists, the good results obtained on the previous election, coupled with the failure of uprising attempts in the summers of 1869 and 1870 (the latter known as la escocada), led to the movement favouring electoral means to achieve power. Ramón Cabrera, de facto leader of the movement, resigned as captain general of the Royal Carlist Army and retired from politics due to disagreements with Carlos de Borbón. The pretender assumed the chieftainship of the party and named a Central Council presided by the Marquis of Villadarias, who organised electoral activity and propaganda.

As a result of the Liberal Union's decision to support Amadeo's election, two factions split up and ran on their own in the 1871 election: the "montpensierists" (montpensieristas), supporters of the Duke of Montpensier's claim to the throne (led by the Duke himself and Antonio de los Ríos Rosas), and the conservative "alfonsists", who supported the claim of Isabella II's son, Alfonso de Borbón (led by Antonio Cánovas del Castillo).

== Overview ==
Under the 1869 Constitution, the Spanish Cortes were conceived as "co-legislative bodies", forming a nearly perfect bicameral system. Both the Congress of Deputies and the Senate exercised legislative, oversight and budgetary functions, sharing almost equal powers, except in budget laws (taxation and public credit) or military force—whose first reading corresponded to Congress, which also had greater preeminence—and in impeachment processes against government ministers, where Congress handled indictment and the Senate the trial.

=== Date ===
The term of each chamber of the Cortes—the Congress and one-quarter of the Senate—expired three years from the date of their previous election, unless they were dissolved earlier. Election day was held over several voting days: the first was used to elect polling station officials, and the remaining ones were devoted to the parliamentary election itself.

The monarch had the prerogative to dissolve both chambers at any given time—either jointly or separately—and call a snap election. Only elections to renew one-quarter of the Senate were constitutionally required to be held concurrently with elections to the Congress, though the former could be renewed in its entirety in the case that a full dissolution was agreed by the monarch.

The Cortes had been officially dissolved since 2 January 1871, following the swearing-in of Amadeo I as King of Spain. The election decree was issued on 14 February, setting election day to start on 8 March (extended until 15 March in the Canary Islands) and scheduling for both chambers to reconvene on 3 April. The publication of the corresponding decree for Puerto Rico was delayed until 1 April, setting election day in the island for between 20 and 23 June. In Cuba, elections were indefinitely postponed due to the Ten Years' War.

=== Electoral system ===
Voting for each chamber of the Cortes was based on universal manhood suffrage, comprising all Spanish national males over 25 years of age with full civil rights. In Puerto Rico, voting was based on censitary suffrage, comprising Spanish males of voting age who were either literate or taxpayers with a minimum quota of 16 escudos in direct taxes. Additional restrictions excluded those deprived of political rights or barred from public office by a final sentence, criminally imprisoned (without bail) or convicted, and homeless.

The Congress of Deputies had one seat per 40,000 inhabitants or fraction above 20,000. All were elected in single-member districts using plurality voting and distributed among the provinces of Spain according to population. Cuba and Puerto Rico were allocated 18 and 15 seats, respectively. As a result of the aforementioned allocation, 424 single-member districts were established.

All 200 Senate seats were elected using indirect, two-round majority voting. Delegates chosen by local councils—each of which was assigned an initial minimum of one delegate, with one additional delegate for every six councillors—voted for senators together with provincial deputies. Provinces and the whole of Puerto Rico were allocated four seats each.

For the Congress, the law provided for by-elections to fill vacant seats during the legislative term. For the Senate, any vacancies arising during the legislative term were filled in the chamber's next full or one-quarter election, with senators elected this way serving the remainder of their seat's original term.

== Candidates ==
=== Nomination rules ===
For the Congress, Spanish males with the right to vote could run for election.

For the Senate, eligibility was limited to Spanish males over 40 years of age, with full civil rights, who belonged (or had belonged) to certain categories:

- Holders of a number of senior public or institutional posts, including the presidents of the Congress; the heads and members of higher courts and state institutions; (Note: These comprised the Council of State, the Supreme Court, the Supreme Council of War and the Court of Auditors.) deputies elected in three general elections or in the Constituent Cortes; government ministers; certain general officers (captain generals, admirals, lieutenant generals and vice admirals); ambassadors; archbishops and bishops; university rectors; heads of the royal academies; four-time provincial deputies; and two-time local mayors of towns over 30,000;
- Senior officials after two years of service, including plenipotentiaries and full professors;
- Being among the 50 largest taxpayers by property tax, or among the 20 largest by corporate tax, in each province.

Ineligibility provisions for both chambers also applied to a number of territorial officials within their areas of jurisdiction or relevant territories, during their term of office and up to three months afterwards; public contractors; tax collectors; and public debtors. Additionally in Puerto Rico, ineligibility extended to those convicted of slave trade crimes.

Incompatibility rules barred representing multiple constituencies simultaneously, as well as combining:

- Legislative roles (deputy, senator, provincial deputy and local councillor) with each other;
- The role of senator with any post not explicitly permitted under Senate eligibility requirements;
- The role of deputy with any government-appointed post, with exceptions—and as many as 40 deputies allowed to simultaneously benefit from these—including government ministers; and a number of specific posts based in Madrid, such as general officers, chiefs in the Central Administration (provided a public salary of Pts 12,500); senior court officials; university authorities and professors; and chief engineers with two years of service.

== Results ==
=== Congress of Deputies ===
← Summary of the 8–11 March 1871 (Note: In the Canary Islands, the election was held until 15 March 1871. In Puerto Rico, the election was held from 20 to 23 June 1871.) Congress of Deputies election results →
Parties and alliances	Popular vote		Seats	
Parties and alliances	Votes	%	Total	+/−
Monarchist–Democratic Coalition (P–UL–D)			235	−24
Federal Democratic Republican Party (PRDF)			52	−17
Catholic–Monarchist Communion (CMC)			51	+28
Moderate Party (PM)			18	+17
Liberal Reformist Party (PLR)^{1}			14	+10
Alfonsist Conservatives (A)			9	+9
Montpensierists (M)			7	+7
Liberal Conservative Party (PLC)^{2}			1	−6
Independents (INDEP)			19	+19
Vacant			18	±0
Total			424	+43
Votes cast / turnout				
Abstentions				
Registered voters				
Sources
Footnotes: ^{1} Liberal Reformist Party results are compared to Independent Liberals totals in the 1869 election.; ^{2} Liberal Conservative Party results are compared to Independent Conservatives totals in the 1869 election.

Seats
M–D	55.42%
PRDF	12.26%
CMC	12.03%
PM	4.25%
PLR	3.30%
A	2.12%
M	1.65%
PLC	0.24%
INDEP	4.48%
Vacant	4.25%

== Bibliography ==
Legislation

- Decreto sobre el ejercicio del sufragio universal (PDF) (Decree). Madrid Gazette (in Spanish). 9 November 1868.
- Decreto electoral para Diputados a Cortes Constituyentes en las provincias de Cuba y Puerto Rico (PDF) (Decree). Madrid Gazette (in Spanish). 14 December 1868.
- Constitución del Estado (PDF) (Constitution). Madrid Gazette (in Spanish). 5 June 1869.
- Ley Electoral (PDF) (Law). Madrid Gazette (in Spanish). 20 August 1870.
- Ley fijando las excepciones al art. 12 de la electoral vigente, relativo a incompatibilidad del cargo de Diputado a Cortes (PDF) (Law). Madrid Gazette (in Spanish). 1 January 1871.
- Ley mandando que los distritos para las elecciones de Diputados a Cortes sean los que se expresan en la división adjunta (PDF) (Law). Madrid Gazette (in Spanish). 1 January 1871.
- Decreto convocando a Cortes ordinarias, que se reunirán el día 3 de Abril de este año (PDF) (Decree). Madrid Gazette (in Spanish). 14 February 1871.
- Decreto mandando se verifiquen en Puerto Rico las elecciones ordinarias de Senadores y Diputados a Cortes (PDF) (Decree). Madrid Gazette (in Spanish). 1 April 1871.

Other

- Pi y Arsuaga, Francisco; Pi y Margall, Francisco (1902). Historia de España en el siglo XIX: sucesos políticos, económicos, sociales y artísticos (in Spanish). Vol. 5. Barcelona: Seguí.
- Espasa, J. (1928). Enciclopedia Universal Ilustrada Europeo-Americana (in Spanish). Vol. 63. Bilbao: Espasa-Calpe. pp. 376–506.
- Ferrer Dalmau, Melchor (1941). Historia del Tradicionalismo Español (in Spanish). Vol. 23. Seville: Editorial Católica Española.
- López Domínguez, José María (1976). Elecciones y partidos políticos de Puerto Rico: 1809-1898 (PDF) (Thesis) (in Spanish). Vol. 1. Puerto Rico: Complutense University of Madrid.
- Ortega Álvarez, Luis; Santaolaya Machetti, Pablo (1996). "Evolución histórica del sistema electoral español". Revista de las Cortes Generales (in Spanish). 37. Cortes Generales: 65–107. doi:10.33426/rcg/1996/37/784. ISSN 0213-0130.
- González Calleja, Eduardo (1998). La razón de la fuerza: orden público, subversión y violencia política en la España de la Restauración (1875-1917) (in Spanish). Vol. 34. Madrid: Spanish National Research Council. ISBN 8400077784.
- Roldán de Montaud, Inés (1999). "Política y elecciones en Cuba durante la restauración" (PDF). Revista de Estudios Políticos (in Spanish) (104): 245–287.
- Vilches, Jorge (2001). Progreso y libertad: el Partido Progresista en la revolución liberal española (in Spanish). Madrid: Alianza Editorial. ISBN 8420667684.
- Carreras de Odriozola, Albert; Tafunell Sambola, Xavier (2005) [1989]. Estadísticas históricas de España, siglos XIX-XX (PDF) (in Spanish). Vol. 1 (II ed.). Bilbao: Fundación BBVA. pp. 1072–1097. ISBN 84-96515-00-1. Archived from the original (PDF) on 24 September 2015.
