= Pact of Ostend =

1866 agreement to end the Spanish monarchy

The Pact of Ostend was an agreement signed on 16 August 1866 in Ostend, Belgium, uniting the exiled Spanish Progressive Party, Democratic Party, and later the Liberal Union to overthrow the monarchy of Isabella II of Spain, whose authoritarian rule had fueled political unrest. Spearheaded by General Juan Prim, the pact aimed to dismantle the existing regime and establish a constituent assembly elected by universal suffrage, paving the way for the Glorious Revolution of 1868, which deposed Isabella II and initiated the democratic reforms of the Sexenio Democrático (1868–1874).

== Background ==
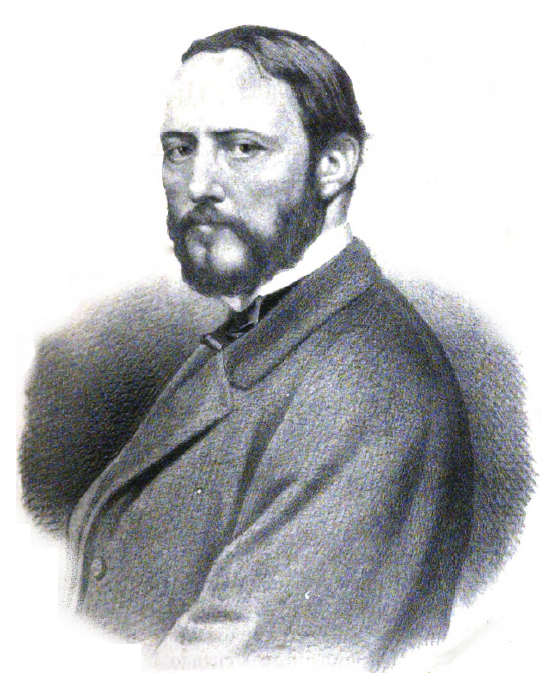
Juan Prim in 1869.

By 1866, Spain faced mounting opposition to Isabella II’s monarchy, plagued by political instability and authoritarianism. In June, the San Gil Barracks uprising, led by sergeants at Madrid’s San Gil artillery barracks, sought to topple her regime but was crushed by General Leopoldo O'Donnell’s Liberal Union government, resulting in 66 executions. In July, deeming O’Donnell too lenient, Isabella dismissed him and appointed General Ramón María Narváez of the Moderate Party, who enforced harsh repressive measures, dismantling the Liberal Union’s power-sharing arrangement.

O’Donnell responded with a strategy he termed vacío en Palacio (“vacuum at the Palace”), withdrawing Liberal Union senators from the Senate to weaken Narváez’s legitimacy. Yet, lingering resentment over the San Gil uprising prevented cooperation with Juan Prim’s Progressive Party. After O’Donnell’s death in November 1867, General Francisco Serrano assumed leadership of the Liberal Union, aligning it with the Pact of Ostend, signed a year earlier by the Progressives and Democratic Party.

== Pact ==
Signed on 16 August 1866 in Ostend, Belgium, the Pact of Ostend united the exiled Progressive Party and Democratic Party under General Juan Prim to overthrow Isabella II’s regime. Its key objectives were:

1. To dismantle the monarchy and its political structure.
2. To convene a constituent assembly, elected by universal suffrage through direct vote, to determine Spain’s government via national sovereignty.

The pact’s broad wording enabled later alliances, notably with the Liberal Union under General Francisco Serrano in March 1868. Historian Josep Fontana argues Serrano joined due to personal grievances—his arrest for petitioning to reopen the Cortes—and economic motives, as president of Ferrocarriles del Norte, seeking government aid for the struggling railway company.

An action committee, led by Prim alongside figures like Cristino Martos and Salustiano de Olózaga, coordinated efforts. Other key participants included military leaders like Blas Pierrad and Manuel Pavía y Rodríguez de Alburquerque, and politicians such as Práxedes Mateo Sagasta and Manuel Ruiz Zorrilla.

Narváez countered with intensified repression. The Cortes, closed in July 1866, remained dissolved, and rigged elections in early 1867 secured a Moderate Party majority, reducing the Liberal Union to four seats. In June 1867, new regulations abolished the vote of no confidence and absolved the government of accountability for actions during the closure, prompting an opposition deputy to call it a “coup d’état.”

== Consequences ==
The Pact of Ostend laid the groundwork for the Glorious Revolution of September 1868, which ousted Isabella II, forcing her into exile in France. Initiated by Admiral Juan Bautista Topete and joined by Juan Prim and Francisco Serrano, the uprising fulfilled the pact’s aim of dismantling the monarchy, ushering in the Sexenio Democrático (1868–1874), a period of liberal reforms.

The Sexenio unfolded in three phases:

- 1868–1870: A provisional government under Prim and Serrano introduced the Spanish Constitution of 1869, establishing male universal suffrage, civil liberties, religious tolerance, and a bicameral legislature.
- 1871–1873: Amadeo I of Spain’s brief reign ended with his abdication in February 1873 amid political instability.
- 1873–1874: The First Spanish Republic collapsed after General Arsenio Martínez Campos’s coup in Sagunto, leading to the Bourbon Restoration in Spain.

The pact’s emphasis on national sovereignty and democratic principles shaped these reforms, though internal divisions limited their longevity.

== See also ==
- Reign of Isabella II

== Bibliography ==
- Fontana, Josep (2007). The Era of Liberalism. Vol. 6 of History of Spain, edited by Josep Fontana and Ramón Villares. Barcelona: Crítica/Marcial Pons. ISBN 978-84-8432-876-6.
- Fuentes, Juan Francisco (2007). The End of the Old Regime (1808–1868): Politics and Society. Madrid: Síntesis. ISBN 978-84-975651-5-8.
- Vilches, Jorge (2001). Progress and Freedom: The Progressive Party in the Spanish Liberal Revolution. Madrid: Alianza Editorial. ISBN 84-206-6768-4.
