= Battle of Alcolea (1868) =

Part of the Glorious Revolution (Spain)

Coordinates: 37°56′12″N 4°39′41″W

- Part of Glorious Revolution (Spain)
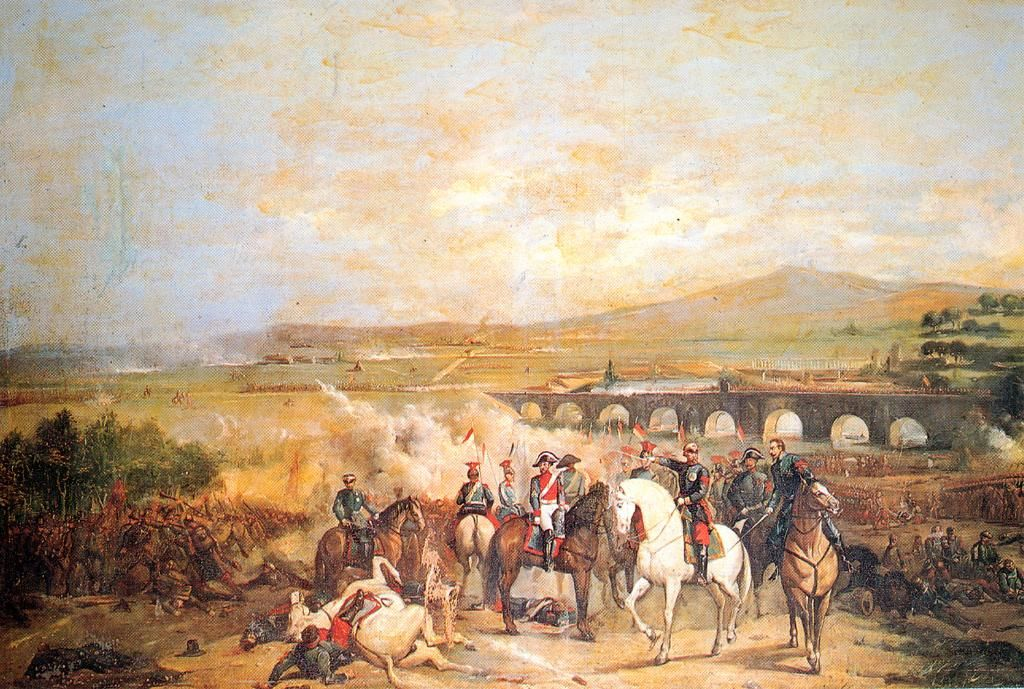
Date	28 September 1868
Location	Alcolea, Córdoba, Spain
Result	Revolutionary victory

Belligerents
(Spain) Revolutionaries	Kingdom of Spain

Commanders and leaders
(Spain) Franciso Serrano	(Spain) Manuel Pavía (WIA)

Strength
Around 10,000 soldiers Lesser quantity of artillery	Around 10,000 soldiers 32 artillery pieces

Casualties and losses
- 400 killed 600 wounded in total

The Battle of Alcolea took place on 28 September 1868, over a bridge above Guadalquivir river in the town of Alcolea, Córdoba, Spain. In this battle, revolutionary forces led by General Francisco Serrano y Domínguez defeated Queen Isabella II of Spain's governmental forces commanded by general Manuel Pavía, forcing her to leave Spain and be exiled in France.

== Background ==
Under Isabelle II's reign, a monopoly of the Government by the Moderate Party was supported. In order to end this system, alternative forces like the Progressive Party and Democratic Party signed the Ostend Agreement in 1866, in which they were committed to depose Queen Isabella II.

== Development of the battle ==
Generals Prim and Topete led the insurrection against Isabel II and began a march towards Madrid. They were met by the royalist troops of Manuel Pavía y Lacy, Marquis of Novaliches, who advanced as far as Andalusia.

The army of General Pavía was composed of two infantry divisions, a cavalry division, an artillery brigade with 32 field guns, a vanguard brigade and some minor auxiliary units, with a total of approximately ten thousand men. The rebels, under the command of General Serrano, formed an army of similar size, although with less artillery.

Pavía planned his deployment in two columns, one along the road on the right bank of the Guadalquivir to fall back from the bridge in the town of Alcolea defended by the troops of General Serrano, fortified in the knowledge that the circumstances prevailing in the rest of Spain at that time were in their favour. The other royalist column advanced along what today is the old National Road IV – from the station of El Carpio, Las Cumbres, the station of Los Cansinos and the Vega de Alcolea – to reach the bridge head on.

On September 28, 1868 both armies met. General Pavía made a frontal attack that was contained by Serrano's rebel troops. To avoid demoralizing his troops, Pavía himself decided to go to the vanguard, being seriously wounded in the face by shrapnel. General of Staff Jiménez de Sandoval then took command and at nightfall, ordered the troops to withdraw and began negotiations.

In total, there were about 400 dead and 600 wounded.
