= Provisional Government (1868–1871) =

1868–1871 Spanish government after the overthrow of Queen Isabella II

Provisional Government of the Kingdom of Spain Gobierno Provisional del Reino de España
- 1868–1871
- Flag Coat of arms
- Government: Constitutional monarchy under a provisional Government
- Regent
  - 1869-1871: Francisco Serrano
- Prime minister
  - 1868-1869: Francisco Serrano
  - 1869-1870: Juan Prim
  - 1870-1871: Juan Bautista Topete
- Historical era: Democratic Sexennium
  - Established: 3 October 1868
  - General election: 15 January 1869
  - Constitution: 1 June 1869
  - Disestablished: 2 January 1871
| Preceded by | Succeeded by |
| Reign of Isabella II of Spain | Reign of Amadeo I of Spain |
- Today part of: Spain

The Provisional Government (1868–1871) was a provisional government formed in Spain between the overthrow of Queen Isabella II of Spain on 30 September 1868 after the Glorious Revolution, and the crowning of the new King Amadeo I of Spain in November 1870.

It was the first phase of a six-year period, known as the Sexenio Democrático (1868–1874).

The revolutionary spirit that had overthrown the Spanish government in September 1868 lacked direction. It was a coalition of three parties: the Unión Liberal headed by Francisco Serrano, the Progressive Party headed by Juan Prim and the Democratic Party.

The Cortes rejected the notion of a republic and chose a constitutional monarchy.

This period can be divided into two periods:

- In the first period, a new constitution was elaborated and enacted on 1 June 1869.
- in the second period, between June 1869 and January 1871, a suitable new King who would respect the new constitution, was searched for. In the meantime Marshal Francisco Serrano, 1st Duke of la Torre was named Regent and Juan Prim, 1st Marquis of los Castillejos Prime Minister.
