= 1867 Spanish general election =

- 10–13 March 1867

All 352 seats in the Congress of Deputies 177 seats needed for a majority
- Registered: 396,863
- Turnout: 205,380 (51.8%) ▼1.6 pp
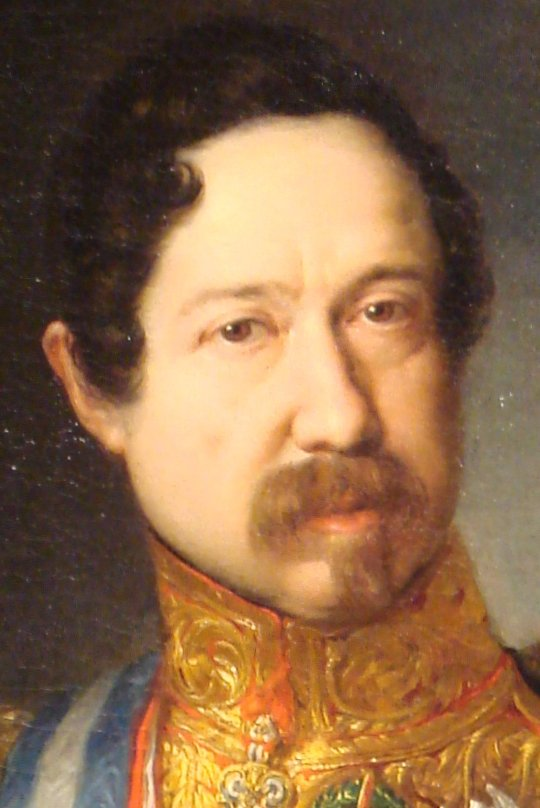

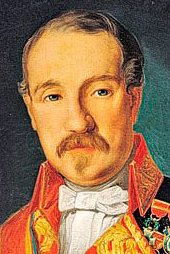
	First party	Second party
Leader	Ramón María Narváez	Leopoldo O'Donnell
Party	Moderate	Liberal Union
Leader's seat	—	—
Prime Minister before election
Ramón María Narváez
Moderate
Prime Minister after election
Ramón María Narváez
Moderate

A general election was held in Spain from 10 to 13 March 1867 to elect the members of the 10th Cortes under the Spanish Constitution of 1845. 352 seats in the Congress of Deputies were up for election. Less than 400,000 people were eligible to vote, about 2.6% of the total population.

The election was mostly uncontested by opposition parties, with many candidates from the ruling Moderate Party running unopposed.

== Overview ==
Under the 1845 Constitution, the Spanish Cortes were conceived as "co-legislative bodies", forming a nearly perfect bicameral system. Both the Congress of Deputies and the Senate exercised legislative, oversight and budgetary functions, sharing almost equal powers, except in budget laws (taxation and public credit)—whose first reading corresponded to Congress—and in impeachment processes against government ministers, where Congress handled indictment and the Senate the trial.

=== Date ===
The term of the Congress expired five years from the date of its previous election, unless it was dissolved earlier. Election day was held over four voting days: the first was used to elect polling station officials, and the remaining three were devoted to the parliamentary election itself.

The monarch had the prerogative to dissolve Congress at any given time and call a snap election.

The Congress was officially dissolved on 30 December 1866, with the corresponding decree setting election day to start on 10 March 1867 and scheduling for the chamber to reconvene on 30 March.

=== Electoral system ===
Voting for the Congress of Deputies was based on censitary suffrage, comprising Spanish national males over 25 years of age who met either of the following:

- Being taxpayers with a minimum quota of 20 escudos in property taxes (paid one year in advance) or in corporate taxes (paid two years in advance);
- Holding specific positions (such as full academics in the royal academies, cathedral chapter members and parish priests, active or retired public employees with an income of 800 escudos, general officers, self-employed professionals with one year of experience, awarded painters or sculptors, senior court officials and certified teachers).

In the Basque Provinces and Navarre—where taxes were not paid directly—voters had instead to prove wealth equivalent to an income of 450 escudos (in capital or property). Additional restrictions excluded those deprived of political rights or barred from public office by a final sentence, criminally imprisoned or convicted, legally incapacitated, bankrupt, and public debtors.

The Congress of Deputies had one seat per 45,000 inhabitants or fraction above 22,500. All were elected in multi-member constituencies corresponding to the provinces of Spain—each assigned a number of seats according to population—using two-round majority voting. Provinces above 337,500 inhabitants were divided into two or more sub-provincial constituencies (with no province electing more than seven seats), whereas municipalities over 45,000 inhabitants were to form an independent constituency each.

As a result of the aforementioned allocation, each Congress multi-member constituency (a total of 77) was entitled the following seats:

Seats	Constituencies
7	Almería, Burgos, Cáceres, Játiva, La Almunia, Lérida, Madrid, Pamplona, Tarragona, Toledo, Gerona
6	Avilés, Coruña, Palma, Barcelona, Castellón, Ciudad Real, Huesca, Lugo, Oviedo, Salamanca, Santiago, Zamora
5	Albacete, Alicante, Badajoz, Cuenca, Guadalajara, Manresa, Pontevedra, Santa Cruz de Tenerife, Santander, Teruel, Valladolid, Vich, Vigo
4	Alcalá, Alcoy, Antequera, Astorga, Ávila, Baeza, Bilbao, Carmona, Castuera, Córdoba, Ginzo de Limia, Guadix, Huelva, Jaén, León, Liria, Logroño, Mondoñedo, Montilla, Morón, Motril, Mula, Orense, Palencia, Ronda, San Sebastián
3	Arcos, Puerto de Santa María, Segovia, Seville, Soria, Valencia
2	Cádiz, Cartagena, Granada, Málaga, Murcia, Vitoria, Zaragoza
1	Jerez, Lorca

The law provided for by-elections to fill vacant seats during the legislative term, as long as this affected at least one third of the seats assigned to a given constituency.

The Senate was an unelected chamber, whose members were directly appointed for life by the monarch—with no statutory cap—from among Spanish males over 30 years of age, who belonged to certain categories:

- The monarch's offspring and the heir apparent once coming of age (25);
- Provided an income of 30,000 reales: the presidents of the Senate and the Congress; lawmakers admitted three times to parliament; government ministers; the heads and members of higher courts and state institutions; (Note: These comprised the Council of State and the Supreme Court.) archbishops and bishops; grandees of Spain; certain general officers (captain generals and lieutenant generals); heads of diplomatic missions abroad (ambassadors and plenipotentiaries); and the heads and members of higher courts;
- Provided an income of 60,000 reales: Spanish nobility;
- Being taxpayers with a minimum quota of 8,000 reales in direct taxes (paid one year in advance): former lawmakers, provincial deputies, mayors of towns over 30,000, or heads of commercial courts.

== Candidates ==
=== Nomination rules ===
For the Congress, secular Spanish males of voting age, taxpayers for any direct tax, could run for election. Causes of ineligibility applied to incumbent senators and those excluded from voting, as well as to:

- Public contractors, within their relevant territories and until the end of their contracts;
- Holders of a number of territorial posts (such as government-appointed positions; local and provincial employees; and provincial deputies), within their areas of jurisdiction, during their term of office and up to one year afterwards.

Incompatibility rules barred representing multiple constituencies simultaneously, as well as combining legislative roles (deputy and senator) with each other; or combining the role of deputy with:

- Certain technical official posts (civil, mining and forest engineers); tax collectors; local authorities, during their term of office and up to one year afterwards; and public contractors; all within their areas of jurisdiction;
- Government-appointed posts, with exceptions including members of the Council of State; heads of diplomatic missions in royal courts in Europe; chief officials in army institutes; senior authorities based in Madrid; high-ranking officials of government departments (provided a public salary of 40,000 reales and three years of service); senior officials in the Royal Household; the heads and members of higher courts in Madrid; general officers; university authorities and professors; and chief engineers with one year of service.

== Bibliography ==
Legislation

- Constitución de la Monarquía Española (PDF) (Constitution). Madrid Gazette (in Spanish). 23 May 1845.
- Ley relativa a incompatibilidades parlamentarias (PDF) (Law). Madrid Gazette (in Spanish). 22 June 1864.
- Ley electoral para Diputados a Cortes (PDF) (Law). Madrid Gazette (in Spanish). 18 July 1865.
- Real decreto disolviendo el Congreso de los Diputados (PDF) (Law). Madrid Gazette (in Spanish). 30 December 1866.

Other

- Ortega Álvarez, Luis; Santaolaya Machetti, Pablo (1996). "Evolución histórica del sistema electoral español". Revista de las Cortes Generales (in Spanish). 37. Cortes Generales: 65–107. doi:10.33426/rcg/1996/37/784. ISSN 0213-0130.
- Caballero Domínguez, Margarita (1999). "El derecho de representación: sufragio y leyes electorales". Ayer. Revista de Historia Contemporánea (in Spanish). 34 (2): 41–63. ISSN 1134-2277.
- Carreras de Odriozola, Albert; Tafunell Sambola, Xavier (2005) [1989]. Estadísticas históricas de España, siglos XIX-XX (PDF) (in Spanish). Vol. 1 (II ed.). Bilbao: Fundación BBVA. pp. 1072–1097. ISBN 84-96515-00-1. Archived from the original (PDF) on 24 September 2015.
- Acín Garcés, Eduardo (2016). La Revolución de 1868 a través de sus protagonistas (PDF) (Thesis) (in Spanish). Zaragoza: University of Zaragoza.
