= Manuel Pavía y Lacy =

Spanish Marshal (1814–1896)

The Most Excellent The Marquess of Novaliches
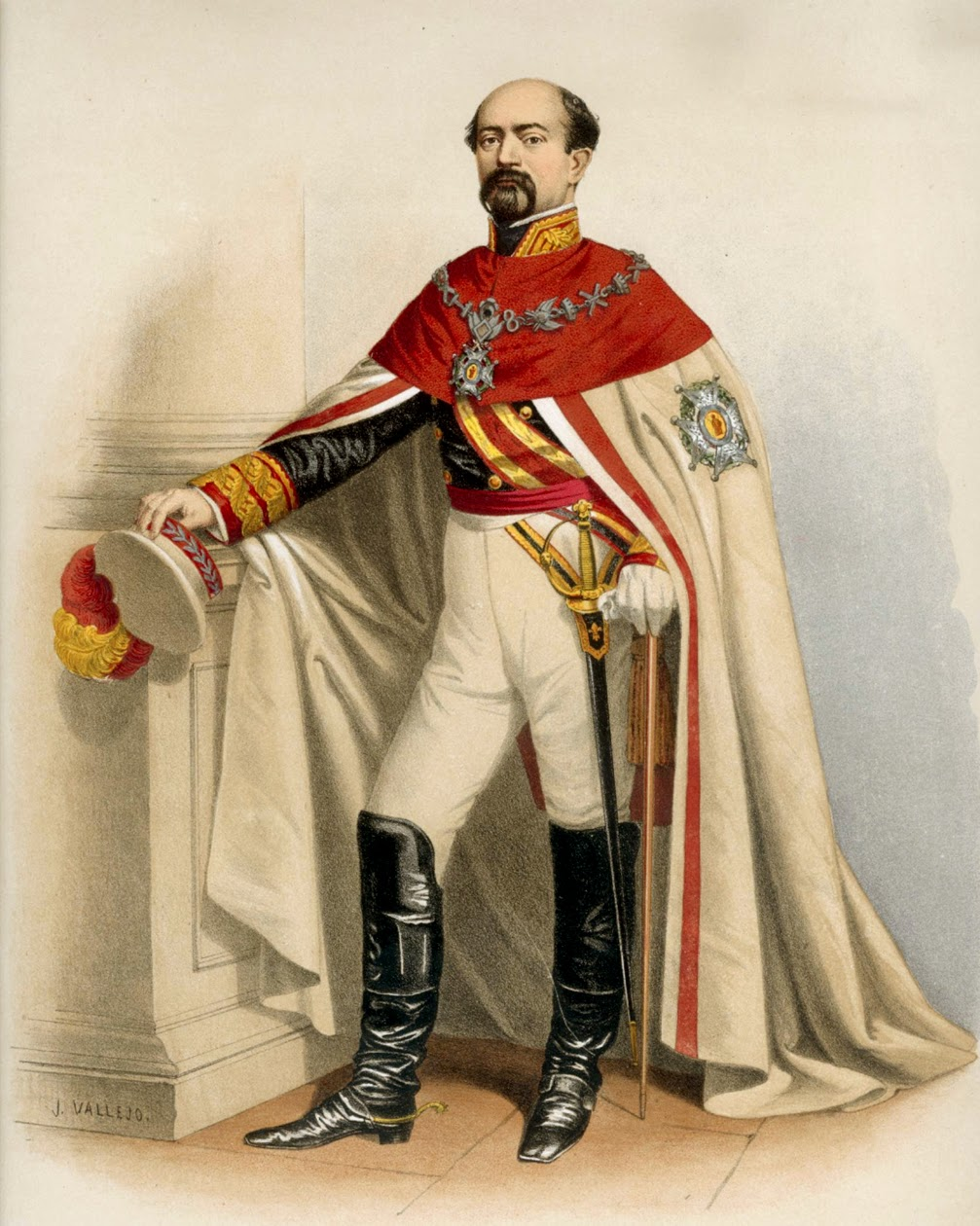

Minister of War of Spain
- In office 28 January 1847 – 15 February 1847
- Monarch: Isabella II
- Preceded by: José Laureano Sanz
- Succeeded by: Marcelino de Oraá Lecumberri

Governor-General of the Philippines
- In office 2 February 1854 – 28 October 1854
- Monarch: Isabella II of Spain
- Preceded by: Ramón Montero y Blandino
- Succeeded by: Ramón Montero y Blandino

Personal details
- Born: Manuel Pavía y Lacy; 6 July 1814 Granada, Spain
- Died: 22 October 1896 (aged 82) Madrid, Spain

Manuel Pavía y Lacy, 1st Marquess of Novaliches (6 July 1814 – 22 October 1896), was a Spanish marshal.

== Biography ==
He was born at Granada on 6 July 1814, the son of Colonel Tomás Pavía y Miralles and Manuela Lacy y Burgunyo. After a few years at the Jesuit school in Valencia he entered the Royal Artillery Academy at Segovia. In 1833 he became a lieutenant in the guards of Queen Isabella II, and during the Carlist War from 1833 to 1840 he became general of division in the latter year at the early age of twenty-six. In early 1838 he fought in Catalonia, in the clashes around Súria and the Malagarriga bridge on 3–5 February and in the action at Biosca against the Carlist forces of Tristany. The Moderate party made him War minister in January 1847 and sent him to Catalonia, where his efforts to put down a Carlist uprising were not successful. He had been made a senator in 1845, and marquess in 1848.

He was sent out to Manila in 1852 as governor-general of the Philippines. In April 1854 he crushed with much sternness a formidable insurrection and carried out many useful reforms. On his return to Spain he married the Countess of Santa Isabel, and commanded the reserves in the Peninsula during the war with Morocco. He refused the war portfolio twice offered him by Marshals O'Donnell and Narvaez and in 1864 was briefly president of government (prime minister) at the head of a cabinet of conservative-liberal Moderates; his government lasted but a few days.

He volunteered to crush the insurrection in Madrid on 22 June 1866, and when the Glorious Revolution broke out in September 1868, he accepted the command of Queen Isabella's troops. He was defeated by Marshal Serrano at the Battle of Alcolea on 28 September 1868, and was so badly wounded in the face, that he was disfigured for life.

After the coup of December 1874 restored the liberal monarchy, Pavía went to meet Alfonso XII of Spain when the king landed at Valencia in January 1875. The Restoration made the Marquess of Novaliches a senator, and the new king gave him the Golden Fleece. He died in Madrid on 22 October 1896.

Government offices
Preceded by Ramón Montero	Governor-General of the Philippines; 2 February 1854 – 28 October 1854	Succeeded by Ramón Montero
