= Federal Democratic Republican Party =

Federal Democratic Republican Party Partido Republicano Democrático Federal
- Leader: Francesc Pi i Margall; Emilio Castelar; Estanislao Figueras; Nicolás Estévanez Murphy; Eduardo Benot
- Founded: 1868; 157 years ago
- Dissolved: 1912; 113 years ago
- Split from: Democratic Party
- Merged into: Republican Nationalist Federal Union
- Newspaper: El Federalista; El Estado Catalán; La Alianza de los Pueblos; El Iris del Pueblo; La Igualdad; La Discusión; El Pueblo Español
- Ideology: Federal republicanism Progressivism; Radical liberalism Republicanism; Secularism; Social liberalism Factions: Cantonalism; Catalanism; Localism; Mutualism (Francesc Pi i Margall)
- Political position: Left-wing
- Colours: Purple

The Federal Democratic Republican Party (Spanish: Partido Republicano Democrático Federal, PRDF) was a Spanish political party founded in 1868 during the Glorious Revolution that was active until 1912. Its ideology was federal republicanism and progressivism.

== History ==
In 1868, the left-wing and federalist republican wing of the Democrats established the Democratic Federal Republican to achieve a secular and democratic federal republic in Spain.

The PRDF was the ruling party during the First Spanish Republic (1873–1874), but it failed in its goal of consolidating a republican form of government and in establishing federalism. After the fall of the First Republic, it became a minority party, although retaining some influence in the republican movement during the Restoration.

== See also ==
- Liberalism and radicalism in Spain
- List of political parties in Spain
