= Liberal Union (Spain) =

Defunct Spanish political party

Liberal Union Unión Liberal
- Leader: Francisco Serrano (last)
- Founder: Leopoldo O'Donnell
- Founded: 1858
- Dissolved: 1874
- Merged into: Conservative Party
- Newspaper: La Época; El Diario Español; La Correspondencia de España
- Ideology: Royalism; Liberalism; Doceañistas: Conservative liberalism Veinteañistas: Liberal radicalism
- Political position: Centre

The Liberal Union (Spanish: Unión Liberal) was a political party in Spain in the third quarter of the 19th century. It was founded by Leopoldo O'Donnell in 1858 with the intent of forging a compromise and taking a centrist position between the two forces that had hitherto dominated Spanish politics during the reign of Isabella II. On one side were the forces of conservative liberalism known as the doceañistas, arrayed around the Moderate Party. Among their leading figures were the queen mother Maria Christina of the Two Sicilies and General Ramón María Narváez. On the other were radical liberal exaltados or veinteañistas arrayed around the Progressive Party and the National Militia. Among their leading figures was General Baldomero Espartero. Both parties had fought on the same side in the Carlist Wars, but they had also at times fought against one another, and elements of the Moderate Party leaned toward absolute monarchy themselves. O'Donnell's intent was to bring together the non-absolutist Moderates and the less "exalted" (radical) Progressives and to occupy the political center. He first came forward with this program in September 1854 a few months after the end of the 10-year reign of the Moderates, but did not succeed in forming a party at that time.

The Liberal Union was more of a pragmatic party than an ideological one. They wished to preserve the Spanish monarchy but to oppose absolutism; to reform public administration and favor centralized government; to offer a certain degree of a multi-party system, with room for both Moderates and Progressives; and to have a policy of strong public investment. They also intended to reform the law of the press, but this never came to fruition.

After the elections to the Cortes 20 September 1858, the Liberal Union had a majority of seats; it maintained power continuously until the Glorious Revolution of 1868 ushered in the Sexenio Democrático.

The Liberal Union centered on O'Donnell and the iron hand of his Minister of Governance, José Posada Herrera. Other prominent figures were Francisco Serrano Domínguez, Juan Manuel de Manzanedo, Juan Prim, Manuel Silvela, and Antonio Cánovas del Castillo. These people, like the party's supporters in general, came from a broad, though largely elite, set of backgrounds: nobles, lawyers, entrepreneurs, merchants, bankers, military officers and government functionaries. To influence public opinion, the Liberal Union had several newspapers: La Época, El Diario Español and La Correspondencia de España.

== See also ==
- Moderantism
- Parties and factions in Isabelline Spain
