= Spanish Constitution of 1869 =

Former constitution of Spain

The Spanish Constitution of 1869 (Spanish: Constitucion española de 1869), enacted on 1 June 1869, was the sixth constitution of the constitutions of Spain to emerge from the turbulent period in Spanish history of 1814-1873.

The constitution was adopted by the Spanish Provisional Government of 1868-1871 which was formed after the successful Glorious Revolution of 1868 that ended the autocratic reign of Isabel II of Spain, creating a constitutional monarchy, with Marshal Francisco Serrano, 1st Duke of la Torre as regent, recognizing the freedom of religion for the first time. The constitution restored the universal manhood suffrage established by the Constitution of 1812, and declared also the freedom of the press, the freedom of assembly and the freedom of association. The constitution came into effect during the reign of Amadeo I of Spain.
