= Glorious Revolution (Spain) =

1868 revolution in Spain that deposed Queen Isabella II

Spanish Revolution of 1868 Glorious Revolution
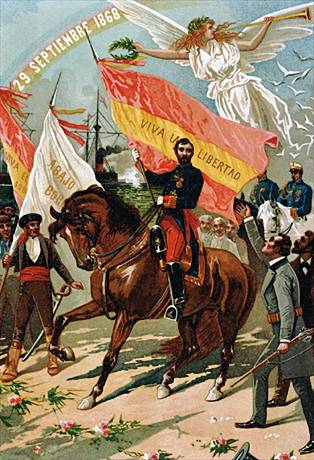
- Revolution of 1868 "La Gloriosa", allegorical cartoon of 1874 published in the magazine La Flaca
Date	19–27 September 1868
Location	Spain
Result	Expulsion of Isabella II: Establishment of a Provisional Government; Beginning of the Democratic Sexennium

Belligerents
Revolutionaries: Liberal Union; Progressive Party; Democratic Party	Kingdom of Spain: Moderate Party

Commanders and leaders
Francisco Serrano; Juan Prim; Juan Bautista Topete	Isabella II; José Gutiérrez

The Glorious Revolution (Spanish: la Gloriosa or la Septembrina) took place in Spain in 1868, resulting in the deposition of Queen Isabella II. The success of the revolution marked the beginning of the Sexenio Democrático with the installation of a provisional government.

== Background ==
Isabella II’s reign had become deeply unpopular by the 1860s. Her government was plagued by corruption, economic crises, and political repression. She had alienated liberals and progressives while becoming increasingly dependent on conservative and clerical factions. The queen’s personal life—including her troubled marriage and various scandals—further eroded public confidence.

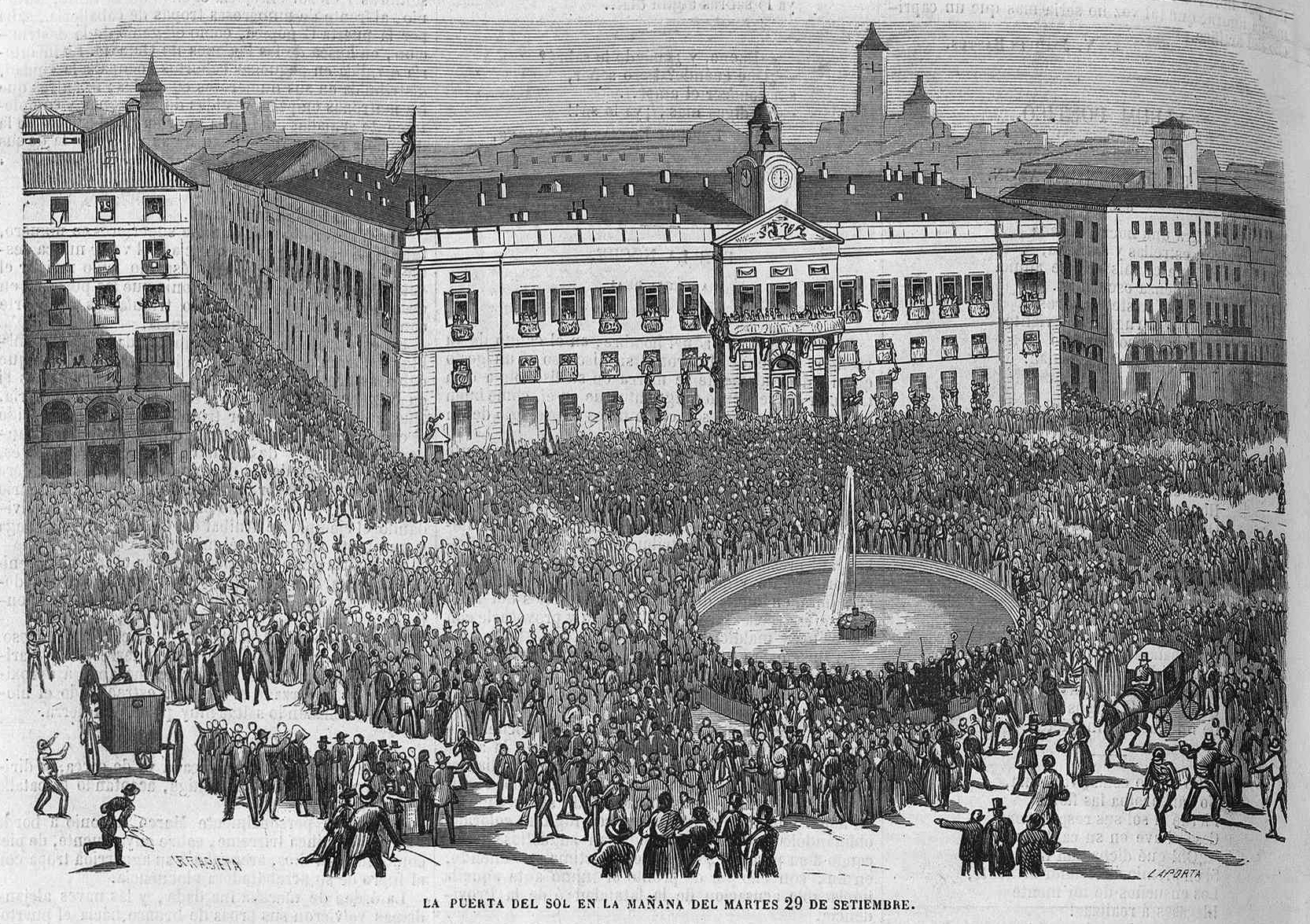
The Puerta del Sol on 29 September 1868.

Leading up to the Glorious Revolution, there had been numerous failed attempts to overthrow the unpopular Queen Isabella, most notably in 1854 and 1861. An 1866 rebellion led by General Juan Prim and a revolt of the sergeants at San Gil barracks, in Madrid, sent a signal to Spanish liberals and republicans that there was serious unrest that could be harnessed if it were properly led. Liberals and republican exiles abroad made agreements at Ostend in 1866 and Brussels in 1867. These agreements laid the framework for a major uprising, this time not merely to replace the Prime Minister with a Liberal, but to overthrow Queen Isabella, whom Spanish liberals and republicans began to see as the source of Spain's difficulties.

Her continual vacillation between liberal and conservative quarters had, by 1868, outraged the moderates, the progressives, and the members of the Unión Liberal. An opposition to her government had developed that crossed party lines. Leopoldo O'Donnell's death in 1867 caused the Unión Liberal to unravel; many of its supporters, who had crossed party lines to create the party initially, joined the growing movement to overthrow Isabella in favor of a more effective regime.

== Revolution ==
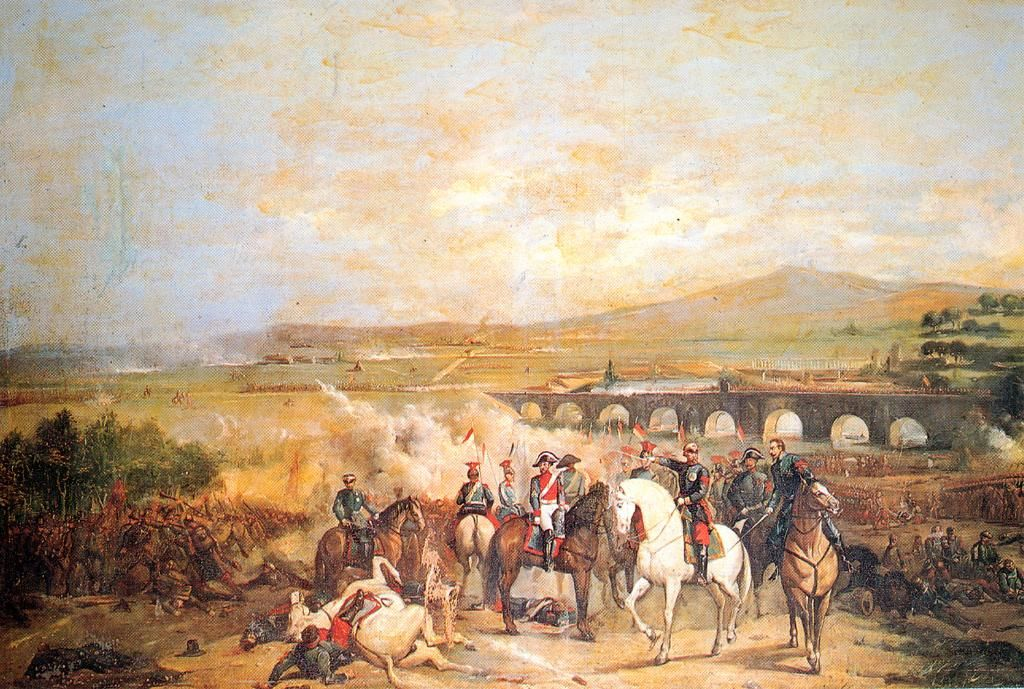
Battle of Alcolea on 28 September 1868

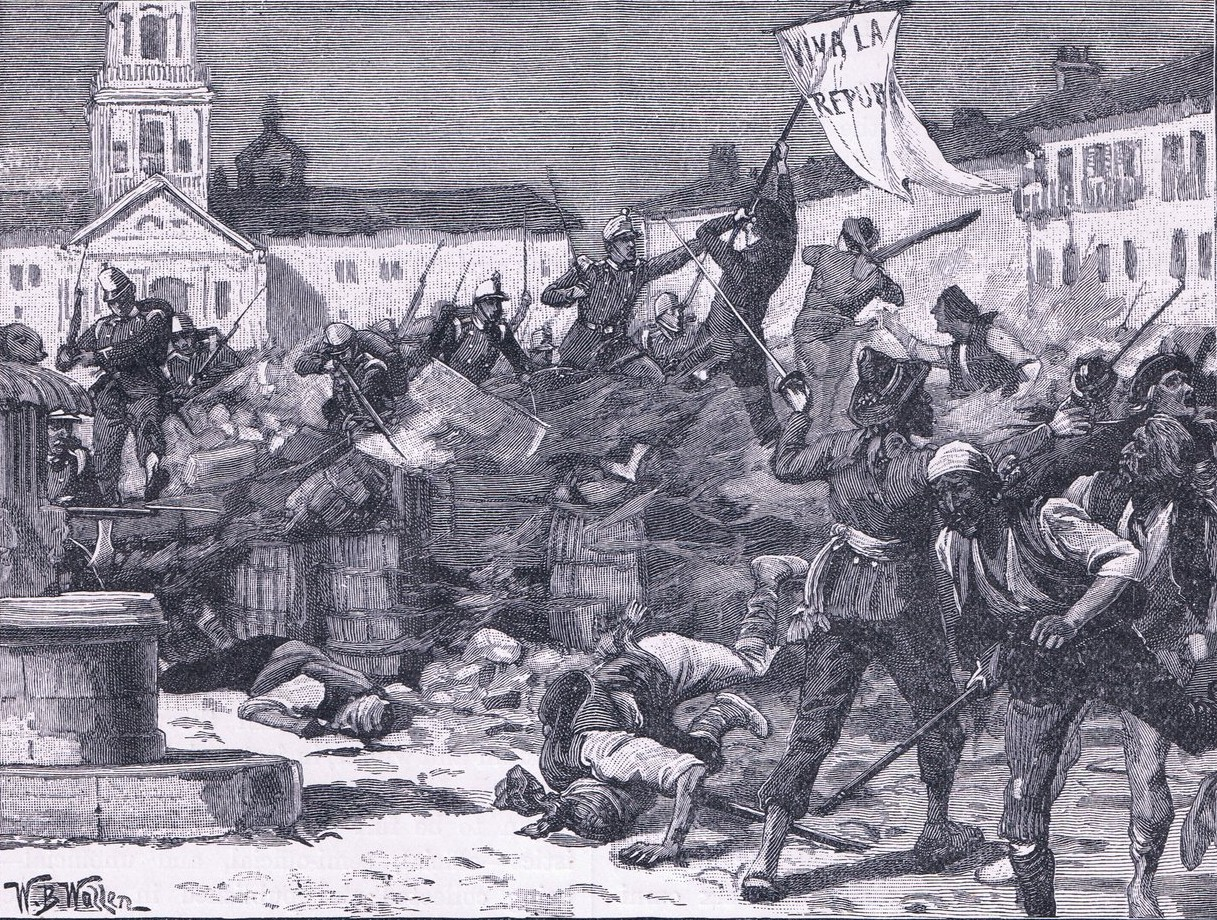
Street fighting in Malaga in 1868

In September 1868, naval forces under admiral Juan Bautista Topete mutinied in Cádiz. This was the same city where a half-century before, Rafael del Riego had launched his coup against Isabella's father, Ferdinand VII.

When the generals Prim and Francisco Serrano denounced the government, much of the army defected to the revolutionary generals on their arrival in Spain. The queen made a brief show of force at the Battle of Alcolea, where her loyal moderado generals under Manuel Pavía were defeated by General Serrano.

In 1868, Queen Isabella crossed into France and retired from Spanish politics. She lived there in exile, at the Palacio Castilla in Paris, until her death in 1904.

== Aftermath ==
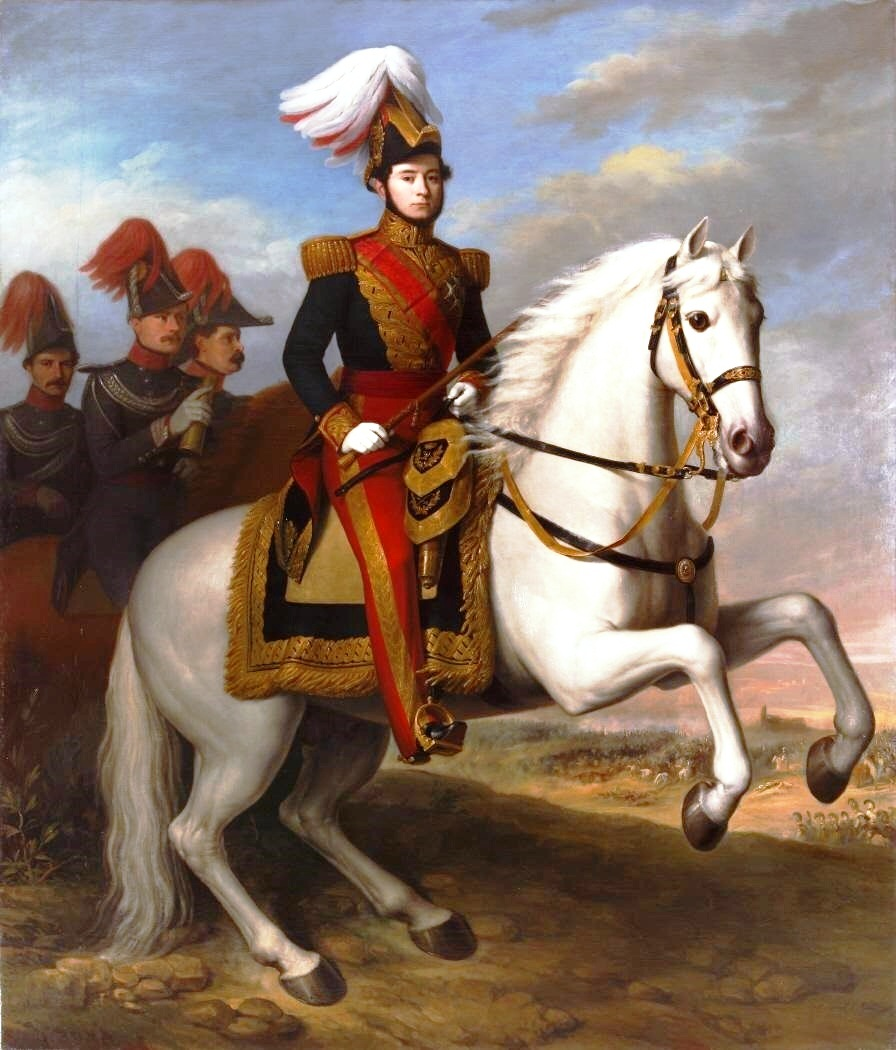
General Juan Prim, an architect of the 1868 revolution against Queen Isabella II.

The revolutionary spirit that had just overthrown the Spanish government lacked direction; the coalition of liberals, moderates, and republicans were faced with the incredible task of creating a government that would suit them better than had Isabella. Control of the government passed to Francisco Serrano, an architect of the revolution against Baldomero Espartero's dictatorship. The Cortes initially rejected the notion of a republic; Serrano was named regent while a search was launched for a suitable monarch to lead the country. In 1869, the Cortes wrote and promulgated a liberal constitution, the first such constitution in Spain since 1812.

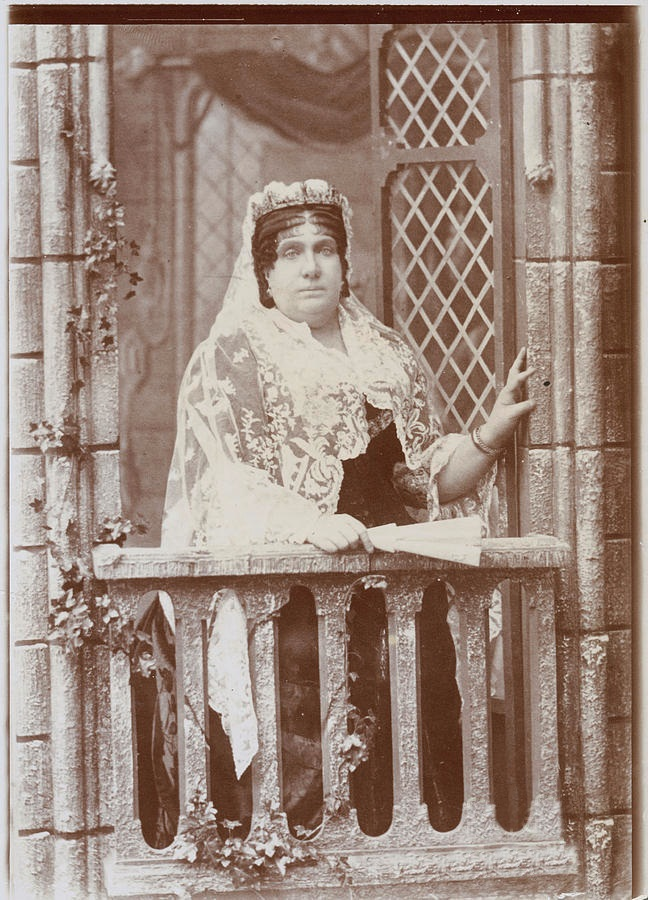
Queen Isabella II of Spain in exile in Paris.

The search for a suitable king proved to be problematic for the Cortes. The republicans were mostly willing to accept a monarch if he was capable and abided by a constitution. Prim, a perennial rebel against the Isabelline governments, was named regent in 1869. The aged Espartero was brought up as an option, still having considerable sway among the progressives; even after he rejected the notion of being named king, he received eight votes for his coronation in the final tally. Many proposed Isabella's young son Alfonso (the future Alfonso XII of Spain), but others thought that he would be dominated by his mother and inherit her flaws. Ferdinand of Saxe-Coburg, the former regent of neighboring Portugal, was sometimes mentioned as a possibility. Politicians feared that a nomination offered to Prince Leopold of Hohenzollern-Sigmaringen would trigger a Franco-Prussian War.

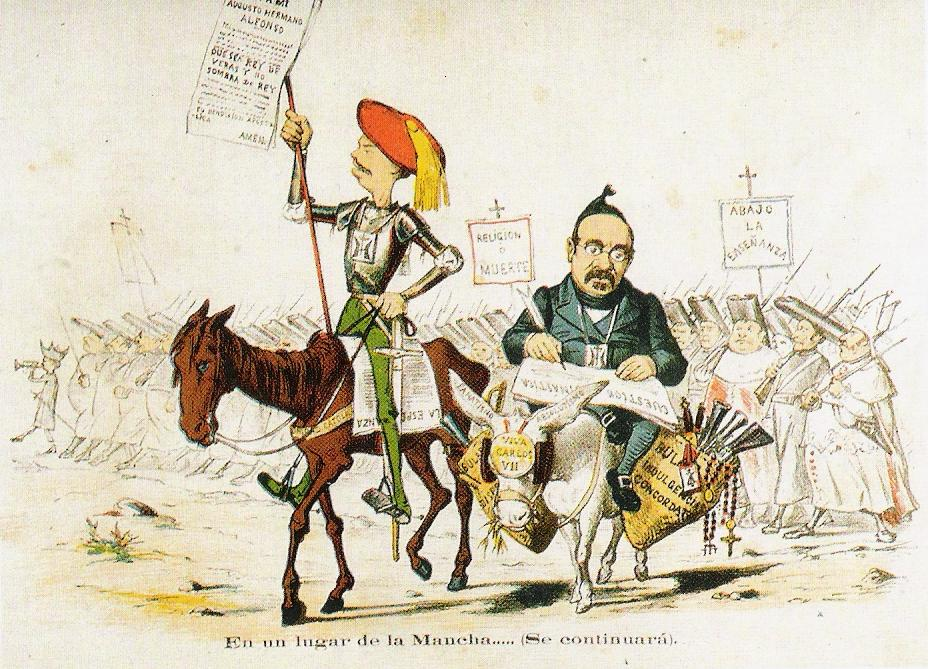
Satiric depiction of the Carlists (1869)

In August 1870, they selected an Italian prince, Amadeo of Savoy. The younger son of Victor Emmanuel II of Italy, Amadeo had less of the troublesome political baggage that a German or French claimant would bring, and his liberal credentials were strong. He was elected King as Amadeo I of Spain on 3 November 1870.

He landed in Cartagena on 27 December, the same day that Juan Prim was assassinated while leaving the Cortes. Amadeo swore upon the general's corpse that he would uphold Spain's constitution. He lasted two years, after which the parties formed the first Spanish Republic. That in turn lasted two years. No political force was willing to restore Isabella; instead, in 1875 the Cortes proclaimed Isabella's son as King Alfonso XII.

== See also ==
- History of Spain (1808–1874)
- Manifesto of Sandhurst
