= Sexenio Democrático =

1868–1874 period of Spain under a provisional government

- 28 September 1868 – 29 December 1874
Reign of Isabella II	Reign of Alfonso XII; Restoration
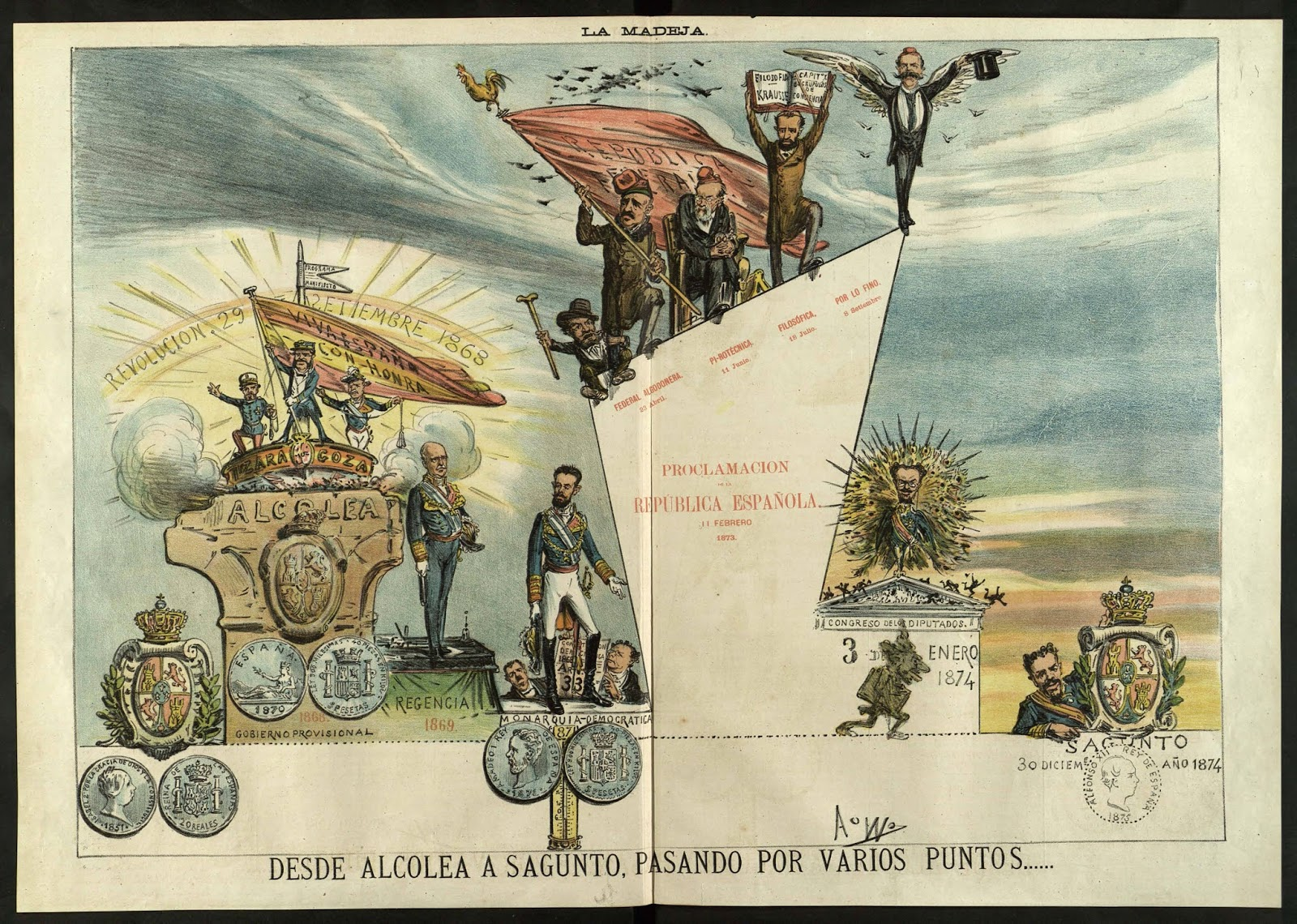
- Political cartoon criticizing the Sexenio (1874)
- Location: Spain
- Key events: Ten Years' War; Spanish Constitution of 1869; Third Carlist War; Cantonal Rebellion; Coup d'état of Pavía

The Sexenio Revolucionario or Sexenio Democrático ("six revolutionary/democratic years") is a six-year period in the history of Spain that spans from 1868 and 1874.

The Sexenio Democrático starts on 30 September 1868 with the overthrow of Queen Isabella II after the Glorious Revolution, and ends on 29 December 1874 with the Bourbon Restoration, when Isabella's son Alfonso XII became King after a coup d'état by general Arsenio Martínez-Campos.

The sexenio spawned the most progressive 19th-century Spanish constitution, the 1869 Constitution, the one dedicating the most space to the rights of the Spanish citizens. However, it was a politically unstable period.

Three phases can be distinguished in Sexenio Democrático:

- The Provisional Government (September 1868 – January 1871).
- The reign of King Amadeo I (January 1871 – February 1873).
- The First Spanish Republic (February 1873 – December 1874).

== See also ==
- Trienio Liberal
- Bienio progresista
