= Democratic Party (Spain, 1849) =

Defunct political party in Spain

Democratic Party Partido Demócratico
- Leader: Francesc Pi i Margall and Cristino Martos
- Founded: 1849
- Dissolved: 1869
- Split from: Progressive Party
- Merged into: Radical Democratic Party; Federal Democratic Republican Party
- Ideology: Liberalism; Radicalism; Republicanism; Progressivism; Secularism
- Political position: Left-wing

The Democratic Party (Spanish: Partido Democrático), more formally known as the Democratic Progressive Party, was a Spanish political party in the reign of Isabella II (reigned 1833–1868). It was a clandestine organisation except during the Progressive Biennium (1854–1856).

In the 1840s, the parliamentary conservatives of the Moderate Party were in power, to the exclusion of the liberals of the centre-left Progressive Party. The Progressive Party's left-wing grew increasingly critical of the Isabelline Monarchy's political regime, feeling the parliamentary system to be stacked against them. They began to demand a root-and-branch institutional reform, particularly the replacement of electoral property requirements with universal manhood suffrage, and the replacement of the sovereignty of the monarch with the principle of popular national sovereignty.

In this climate the Revolutions of 1848 broke out across Europe, and the Radical wing of the Progressive Party was particularly impressed by the revolution in France that brought about the Second Republic. These examples pushed the Progressives' left-wing to adopt more hardline political demands incompatible with the existing constitutional monarchy, such as republicanism.

In 1849, the left wing of the progressives broke off to form the Democratic Progressive Party, which they considered to be the true heir to Spain's radical and Jacobin liberal tradition. The new party represented an alliance of radical liberals (see Radicalism) and moderate socialists (see utopian socialism). Led by Francisco Pi y Margall and Cristino Martos, the Democrats called for an end to the conservative parliamentary monarchy of Queen Isabella, and the full application of the Constitution of 1812.

Members of the Democratic Party were involved in a number of attempted insurrections in the 1850s and 1860s, most notably with the Loja Uprising in 1861.

Following the Glorious Revolution of 1868, which deposed Queen Isabella, the party disintegrated due to conflicts between its different factions.

- The cimbrios faction accepted the replacement of the conservative parliamentary monarchy of Isabel II with a more ceremonial monarchy under Amadeo I; known as the cimbrios, they merged with the Radical Democratic Party of Manuel Ruiz Zorrilla.
- The federalist faction, led by party leader Pi i Margall, rejected the monarchy entirely, calling for a democratic republic. They sought cooperation with incipient Spanish labour movement and the Catalan independentists, and went on to form the Federal Republican Party.

== See also ==
- Radicalism
- Liberalism and radicalism in Spain
- Parties and factions in Isabelline Spain
