= Juan Prim =

Spanish Prime minister, general and statesman (1814–1870)

The Most Excellent Juan Prim
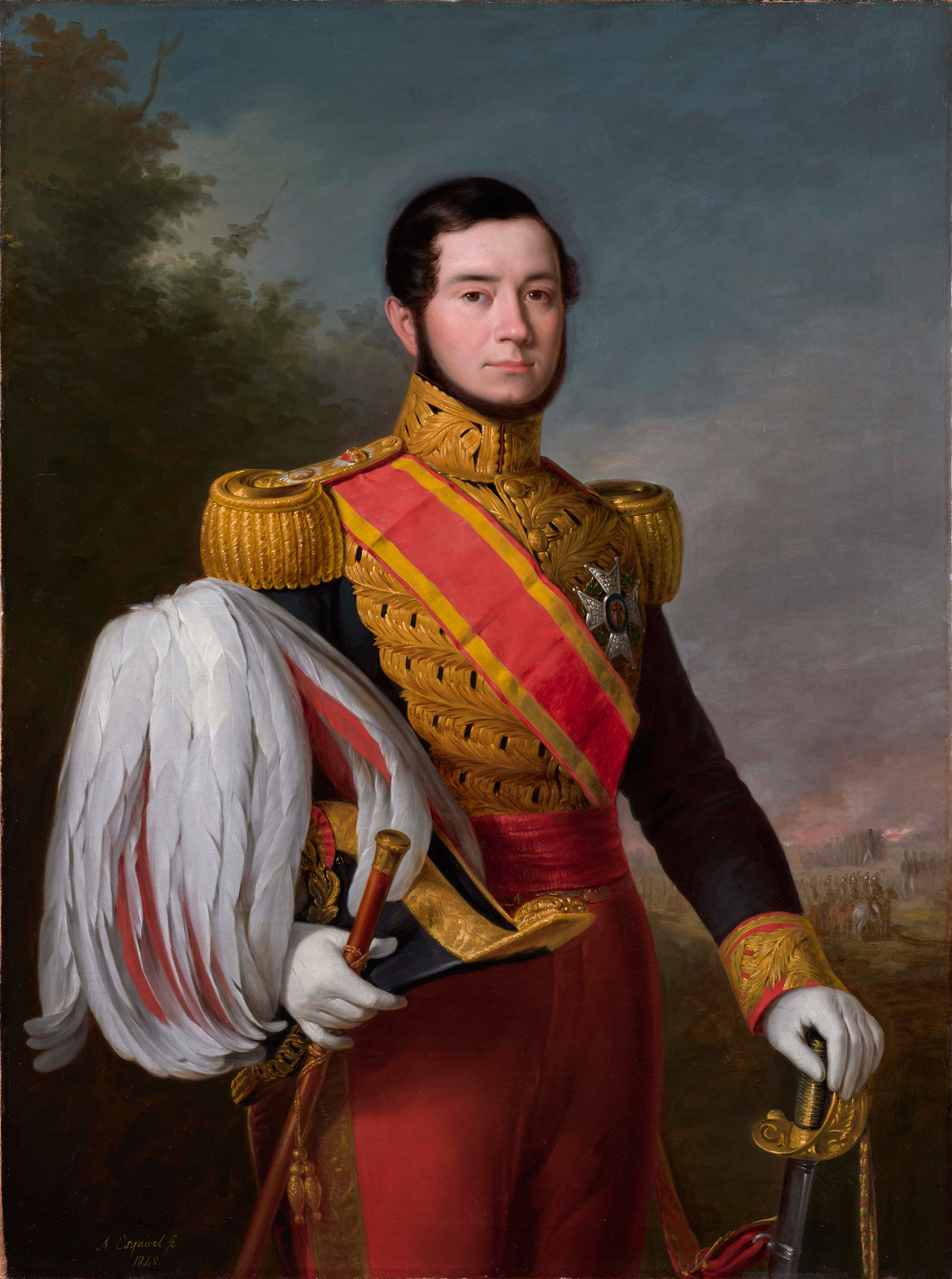
- Portrayed by Antonio María Esquivel at age 34

Prime Minister of Spain
- In office 18 June 1869 – 27 December 1870
- Monarchs: Vacant; (Francisco Serrano as Regent); Amadeo I; (Nov–Dec 1870)
- Preceded by: Francisco Serrano
- Succeeded by: Juan Bautista Topete

Minister of War of Spain
- In office 8 October 1868 – 27 December 1870
- Prime Minister: Francisco Serrano; Himself
- Preceded by: José Gutiérrez de la Concha
- Succeeded by: Juan Bautista Topete

Minister of the Navy of Spain
- Acting
- In office 6 November 1869 – 9 January 1870
- Prime Minister: Himself
- Preceded by: Juan Bautista Topete
- Succeeded by: Juan Bautista Topete

Governor of Puerto Rico
- In office 15 October 1847 – 12 July 1848
- Monarch: Isabella II
- Preceded by: Rafael Arístegui
- Succeeded by: Juan de la Pezuela

Personal details
- Born: Anton Joan Pau Maria Prim; 6 December 1814 Reus, Spain
- Died: 30 December 1870 (aged 56) Madrid, Spain
- Party: Progressive
- Profession: Politician

Military service
- Branch/service: Army
- Years of service: 1834–1868
- Rank: General
- Battles/wars: First Carlist War; Crimean War; First Hispano-Moroccan War; Second French intervention in Mexico; Glorious Revolution
- Awards: Laureate Cross of Saint Ferdinand (3); Order of the Medjidie

Juan Prim y Prats, 1st Count of Reus, 1st Marquis of los Castillejos, 1st Viscount of Bruch (Spanish pronunciation: [ˈxwam ˈpɾim i ˈpɾats]; Catalan: Joan Prim i Prats [ʒuˈam ˈpɾim i ˈpɾats]; 6 December 1814 – 30 December 1870) was a Spanish general and statesman who was briefly Prime Minister of Spain until his assassination.

== Biography ==
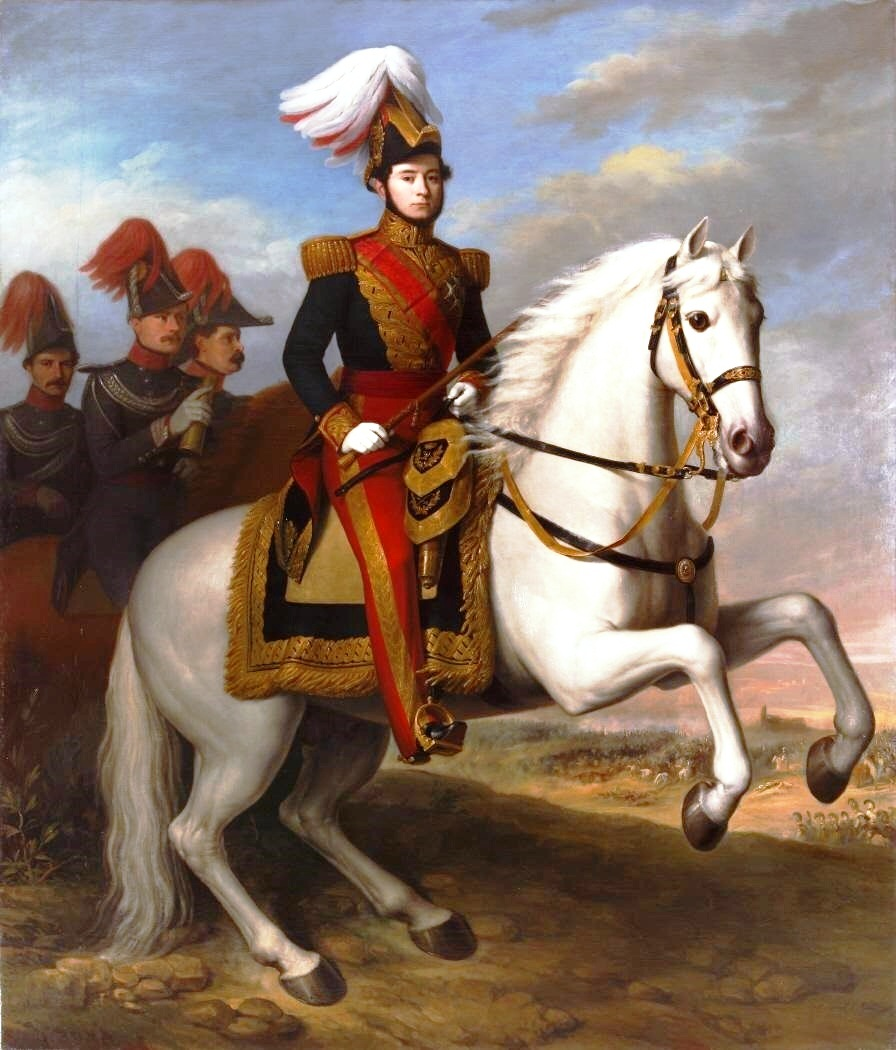
Juan Prim, Spanish general and statesman. Painting by Antonio María Esquivel

Born in Reus on 6 December 1814, Prim was the son of lieutenant colonel Pablo Prim. (Note: According to W.O. Cavenagh (1898), writing for The Genealogical Magazine, Juan Prim was a descendant of John Prim, of Johnswell, county Kilkenny (d. 1755), an Irish descendant of a family of Dutch settlers originally surnamed Prime, established in England during the reign of Elizabeth I and a branch of which relocated to Ireland during the reign of Charles I. A descendant of Mark (d. 1782)—eldest son of John and his first wife Miss Rodgers—would have migrated to Spain, made a fortune and founded the Spanish branch.) He entered the free corps known as the tiradores de Isabel II and met his baptism of fire on 7 August 1834, during the First Carlist War, facing the Carlist party of Triaxet.

Over the course of the war, he rose to the rank of lieutenant-colonel and had two orders of knighthood conferred upon him. After the pacification of 1839, as a progressist opposed to the dictatorship of General Espartero, he was sent into exile. However, in 1843 he was elected deputy for Tarragona, and after defeating Espartero at Bruch he entered Madrid in triumph with General Serrano. The regent Maria Christina promoted him major-general, and made him conde de Reus (Count of Reus) and vizconde del Bruch (Viscount of Bruch).

General Narváez, the prime minister, failed to understand what constitutional freedom meant, and General Prim, on showing signs of opposition, was sentenced to six years imprisonment in the Philippine Islands. The sentence was not carried out, and Prim remained an exile in England and France until the amnesty of 1847. He then returned to Spain, and was first employed as captain-general of Puerto Rico (Governor of Puerto Rico) and afterwards as military representative with the sultan during the Crimean War. In 1854 he was elected to the Cortes, and gave his support to General O'Donnell, who promoted him lieutenant-general in 1856. In the war with Morocco he did such good service at Castillejos (Fnideq), Cabo Negro, Guad al Gelu and Campamento in 1860 that he was made marqués de los Castillejos (Marquess of los Castillejos) and Grande de España (Grandee of Spain).

Prim commanded the Spanish expeditionary army in Mexico in 1862, when Spain, Great Britain, and France sought forced payment from the liberal government of Benito Juárez for loans. Prim was a sympathizer with the Mexican liberal cause, thus he refused to consent to the ambitious schemes of French emperor Napoleon III, and withdrew Spanish forces following a meeting with Manuel Doblado. Prim was a staunch supporter of the Union in the American Civil War and on his trip to the United States, where he visited New York and Philadelphia, he met with Lincoln in Washington.

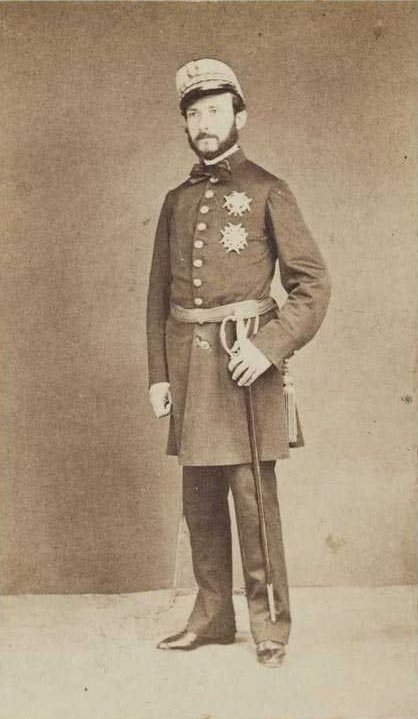
Photograph of General Prim, c. 1861-65

On Prim's return to Spain, he joined the opposition, heading pronunciamentos in Catalonia against generals Narváez and O'Donnell. All his attempts failed until the death of Narváez in April 1868, after which Queen Isabella became increasingly tyrannical until at last even Serrano was exiled. In September 1868 General Serrano and General Prim returned, and Brigadier Topete, commanding the fleet, raised the standard of revolt at Cádiz. In July 1869 General Serrano was elected regent, and Prim became president of the council and was made a marshal.

On 6 November 1870 Amadeo, Duke of Aosta, was elected king of Spain, but General Prim, on leaving the chamber of the Cortes on 28 December, was shot by unknown assassins and died two days later. The Cortes took his children as wards of the country; three days afterwards King Amadeo I swore in the presence of the corpse to observe the new Spanish constitution. This is due to the fact that Prim had searched all the European courts of the time trying to find a monarch who was not opposed to being democratically elected. He is quoted for saying that "looking for a democratic monarch in Europe is like trying to find an atheist in heaven". After France had rejected the almost-elected Leopold of Hohenzollern because of their fear that Prussia might thereby become more powerful, Amadeo of Savoy was the most fitting who consented.

The workshop of metalworker Plácido Zuloaga was commissioned to make a monumental sarcophagus for Prim. Completed in 1875 in Eibar, this now resides in the cemetery at Reus.

== Gallery ==
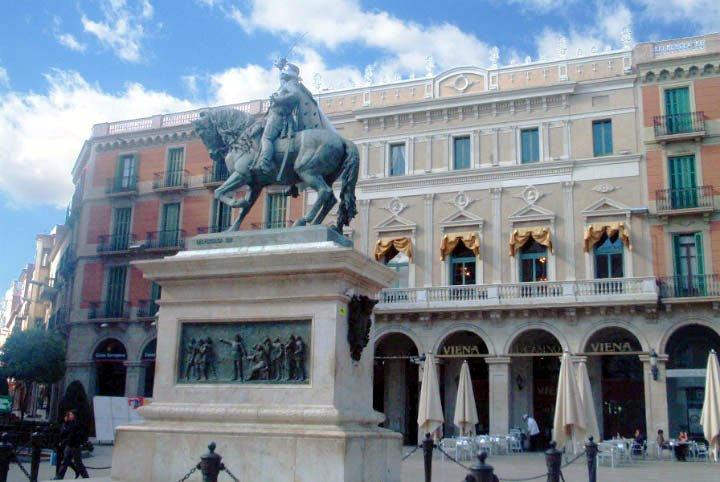
Monument to Prim sculpted by Josep Llimona in Reus

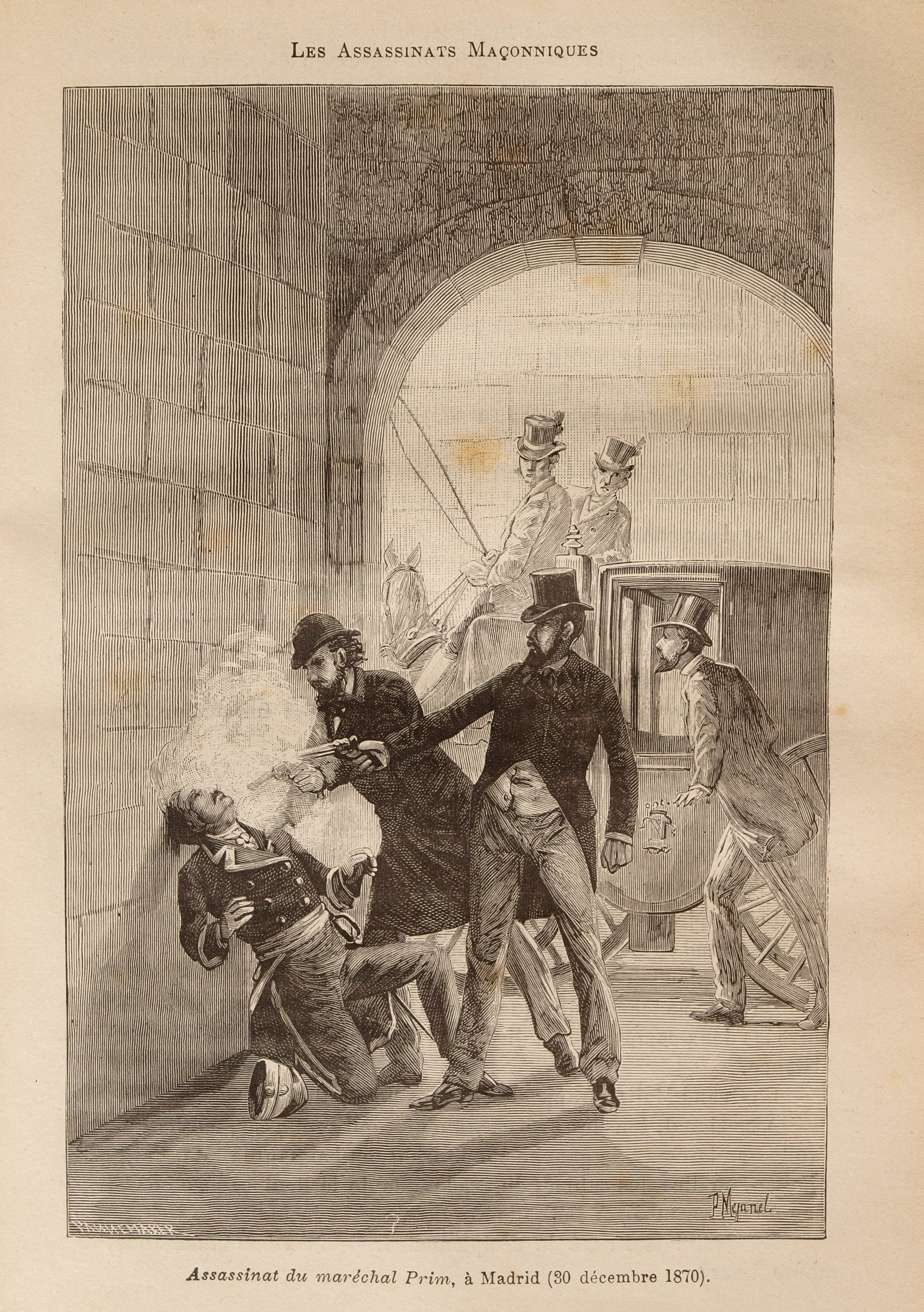
Assassination of Juan Prim (drawing by Pierre Méjanel)

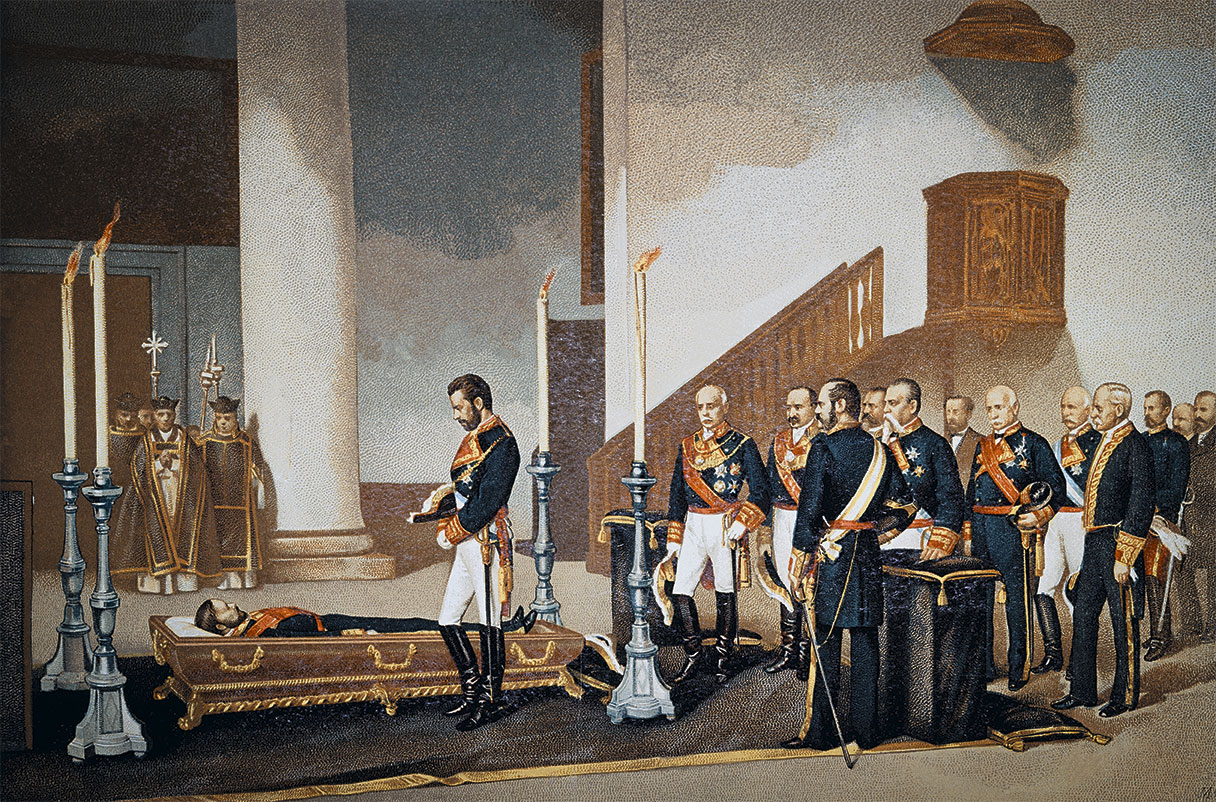
"Amadeo I in front of the coffin of General Prim (1870)" by Antonio Gisbert

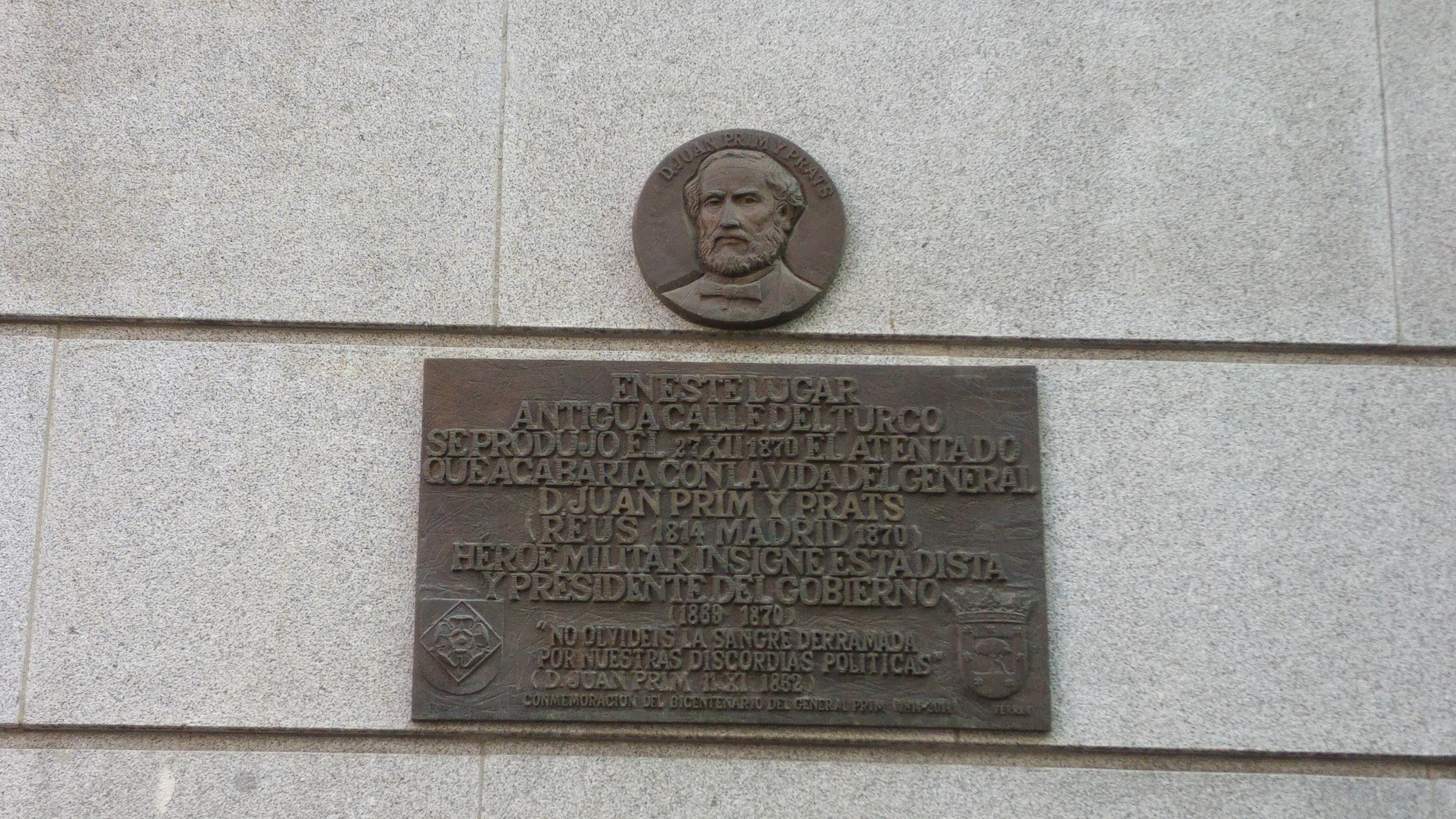
Commemorative plaque

== See also ==
- List of unsolved murders (before 1900)

Preceded by Rafael De Aristegui y Velez	Governor of Puerto Rico; 1847-1848	Succeeded by Juan De La Pezuela y Cevallos
Preceded by Francisco Serrano y Domínguez, Duke de la Torre	Prime Minister of Spain; 1868-1869	Succeeded by Juan Bautista Topete y Carballo
