= Progressive Party (Spain) =

Progressive Party Partido Progresista
- Leader: Juan Prim (last)
- Founder: Juan Álvarez Mendizábal
- Founded: 1834; 192 years ago
- Dissolved: 1874; 152 years ago
- Succeeded by: Constitutional Party
- Ideology: Liberalism (Spanish); Progressivism; Federalism; Anti-clericalism
- Political position: Centre-left

The Progressive Party (Spanish: Partido Progresista) was one of the two Spanish political parties that contended for power during the reign of Isabel II (reigned 1833–1868). It was to the left of the opposing Moderate Party (Spanish: Partido Moderado) but also characterised itself as liberal. Like the Moderate Party, it supported Isabel against the claims of the Carlists.

== History ==
The party was established in 1834 as the extreme liberal opposition, during the regency of queen mother Maria Christina of the Two Sicilies; Queen Isabel was only three years old. It was the party of the exaltados, veinteañistas or progresistas, heirs of the Trienio Liberal ("liberal triennium") of 1820–1823, whereas the Moderate Party represented the doceañistas who traced their roots to the Spanish Constitution of 1812. The Progressives were the party of the National Militia, the jury trial, a secular state, and of national sovereignty and the broadening of the franchise under census suffrage. On this last matter, their position was somewhat milder than popular sovereignty, in that it did not necessarily call for the universal franchise.

Like their Moderate opponents, they supported the monarchy of Isabel II, particularly against the Carlist pretenders. Their political position, however, was repeatedly compromised as Maria Christina and later Isabela herself continually attempted to achieve a compromise with the Carlists.

During the Regency of Baldomero Espartero (1840–1843), the Progressive Party became the dominant political force, advocating constitutional reforms, expansion of civil liberties, and limits to royal prerogative. Internal divisions, combined with opposition from Moderate Party conservatives and sectors of the army, led to Espartero’s fall in 1843.

The subsequent Década Moderada (1844–1854) saw the Progressives excluded from power as the Moderates consolidated control under a more restrictive political system established by the 1845 Constitution.

The Bienio Progresista (1854–1856) began after the Vicalvarada uprising and the Manzanares Manifesto, which brought Espartero back to the premiership, with O’Donnell as Minister of War. The government implemented reforms like the desamortización (confiscation and sale) of church lands under Pascual Madoz. Political instability, economic tensions, and growing divisions between Espartero and O’Donnell led to the Bienio’s collapse and a return to Moderate dominance.

During the 1860s, Progressive leaders, increasingly marginalized, formed alliances with Democrats and unionist to overthrow Queen Isabella II. The Glorious Revolution of 1868 ushered in the Sexenio Democrático (1868–1874), in which the Progressives played a central role in drafting the liberal Constitution of 1869 and establishing a constitutional monarchy under Amadeo I.

The Progressive Party disintegrated gradually after the murder of its last leader, General Juan Prim, 1st Marquis of los Castillejos in 1870, splitting into the Constitutional Party, the Radical Democratic Party, and the Democratic Party. It wasn't formally dissolved, however, until the 1874 restoration of the monarchy.

== See also ==
- Parties and factions in Isabelline Spain
- Trienio Liberal
