= List of presidents of the Congress of Deputies =

The president of the Congress of Deputies, also known as the president of the Cortes, is the highest authority of the Congress of Deputies of Spain, the lower house of the Cortes Generales. The President is elected by and among the incumbent members of congress (diputados).

The office was established in 1810 when the Supreme Central Junta convened the first Spain's general election to form the Cortes of Cádiz. In the first meeting of the Cortes, on 24 September 1810, the first president was elected, Ramón Lázaro de Dou y de Bassols, although Benito Ramón Hermida Maldonado held the office as acting president during the beginning of that meeting. During this time, the Cortes were a unicameral parliament and the tenure of the president of the house was one month. In 1814, King Ferdinand VII dissolved the parliament and abolished the 1812 Constitution, restoring absolutism. Briefly, from 1820 to 1823, the Constitution was restored against the will of the monarch and in 1823 the King abolished it again until his death in 1833, when Queen Regent Maria Christina, in order to gain the favour of the Liberals to support the reign of her daughter, Isabella II, approved the Royal Statue of 1834, creating a bicameral parliament and restoring the office. The parliament was inactive in three more times in Spanish history: from 1923 to 1927 due to the dictatorship of Primo de Rivera (although he created an advisory assembly from 1927 to 1929), from 1929 to 1931 after the dictatorship and from 1939 to 1943, after the Civil War.

After 1834, none of the constitutions or the different internal rules of the Congress established a time limited to held the office, so it is understood that the president occupies it for the time of the legislature, an idea that continues today in force. Another peculiarity of Spanish parliamentarism is the existence of the position of acting president. After every general election and before the Congress is fully constituted, the Congress' internal rules from 1834 to 1982 established that an acting president had to be elected, and, once the Congress is fully constituted, the House must ratified the appointment or elect a new president. In 1982, this provision disappeared.

The current and 182nd President, Francina Armengol, was elected on August 17, 2023. Armengol, former president of the Government of the Balearic Islands, currently represents the electoral district of the Balearic Islands.

== List of presidents ==
Since its creation in 1810, 138 people have served as president in 182 presidencies. The first president was Ramón Lázaro de Dou y de Bassols who served during the first month. The shortest presidency was that of the Francisco Salmerón y Alonso which was president briefly between March 19 and March 22, 1873, and the longest was that of Esteban de Bilbao Eguía serving 22 years, 6 months and 13 days. Many presidents have served in non-consecutive terms in office; The Marquess of Vega de Armijo served in five non-consecutive terms while Francisco Martínez de la Rosa and Francisco Javier Istúriz y Montero served in four. The first woman who have served as president was Luisa Fernanda Rudi Ubeda, between 2000 and 2004.

No.	Name	Party	Constituency	Term of service
-	Benito Ramón Hermida Maldonado	Independent	Galicia (Santiago de Compostela)	September 24, 1810
1st	Ramón Lázaro de Dou y de Bassols	Independent	Principality of Catalonia	September 24, 1810 – October 23, 1810
2nd	Luis Rodríguez del Monte y del Prado	Independent	Galicia (Betanzos)	October 24, 1810 – November 23, 1810
3rd	José Luis Morales Gallego	Independent	Seville (representing the Junta of Seville)	November 24, 1810 – December 23, 1810
4th	Alonso Cañedo y Vigil	Independent	Asturias (representing the Junta of Asturias)	December 24, 1810 – January 23, 1811
5th	Antonio Joaquín Pérez Martínez Robles	Independent	New Spain (Puebla de los Ángeles)	January 24, 1811 – February 23, 1811
6th	Vicente Joaquín Noguera Climent	Independent	Valencia (representing the Junta of Valencia)	February 24, 1811 – March 23, 1811
7th	Diego Muñoz Torrero y Ramírez	Independent	Extremadura	March 24, 1811 – April 23, 1811
8th	Vicente Cano Manuel y Ramírez de Arellano	Independent	Murcia	April 24, 1811 – May 23, 1811
9th	José Pablo Valiente y Bravo	Independent	Seville	May 24, 1811 – June 23, 1811
10th	Jaime Creus Martí	Independent	Principality of Catalonia	June 24, 1811 – July 23, 1811
11th	Juan José Guereña y Garayo	Independent	New Spain (Durango)	July 24, 1811 – August 23, 1811
12th	Ramón Giraldo y Arquellada	Independent	La Mancha	August 24, 1811 – September 23, 1811
13th	Bernardo Nadal y Crespí	Independent	Majorca (Palma de Mallorca)	September 24, 1811 – October 23, 1811
14th	Antonio Larrazábal y Arrivillaga	Independent	Guatemala	October 24, 1811 – November 23, 1811
15th	José Casquete de Prado Bootello	Independent	Extremadura	November 24, 1811 – December 23, 1811
16th	Manuel de Villafañe y Andreu	Independent	Valencia	December 24, 1811 – January 23, 1812
17th	Antonio Agustín Payán de Tejada y Figueroa	Independent	Galicia (La Coruña)	January 24, 1812 – February 23, 1812
18th	Vicente Pascual y Esteban	Independent	Aragón (Teruel)	February 24, 1812 – March 23, 1812
19th	Vicente Morales Duárez	Independent	Viceroyalty of Peru	March 24, 1812 – April 2, 1812†
20th	José María Gutiérrez de Terán	Independent	New Spain	April 2, 1812 – April 23, 1812
20th	José María Gutiérrez de Terán	Independent	New Spain	April 24, 1812 – May 23, 1812
21st	José Miguel Guridi y Alcocer	Independent	New Spain (Tlaxcala)	May 24, 1812 – June 23, 1812
22nd	Juan Polo y Catalina	Independent	Aragón	June 24, 1812 – July 23, 1812
23rd	Felipe Vázquez Canga	Independent	Asturias	July 24, 1812 – August 23, 1812
24th	Andrés Ángel de la Vega Infanzón	Independent	Asturias	August 24, 1812 – September 23, 1812
25th	Andrés de Jáuregui de Aróstegui	Independent	Cuba (La Habana)	September 24, 1812 – October 23, 1812
26th	Francisco Morros y Cibila	Independent	Principality of Catalonia	October 24, 1812 – November 23, 1812
27th	Juan del Valle y Milans del Bosch	Independent	Principality of Catalonia	November 24, 1812 – December 23, 1812
28th	Francisco Ciscar y Ciscar	Independent	Valencia	December 24, 1812 – January 23, 1813
29th	Miguel Antonio de Zumalacárregui e Imaz	Independent	Gipuzkoa (Santiago de Compostela)	January 24, 1813 – February 23, 1813
30th	Joaquín Maniau Torquemada	Independent	New Spain (Veracruz)	February 24, 1813 – March 23, 1813
31st	Francisco de Calello Miranda	Independent	Asturias	March 24, 1813 – April 23, 1813
32nd	Pedro José Gordillo y Ramos	Independent	Canary Islands (Gran Canaria)	April 24, 1813 – May 23, 1813
33rd	Florencio del Castillo Solano	Independent	Guatemala	May 24, 1813 – June 23, 1813
34th	José Antonio Sombiela y Mestre	Independent	Valencia	June 24, 1813 – July 23, 1813
35th	Andrés Morales de los Ríos y Gil	Independent	Cádiz	July 24, 1813 – August 23, 1813
36th	José Miguel Gordoa y Barrios	Independent	New Spain (Zacatecas)	August 24, 1813 – September 25, 1813
37th	Francisco Rodríguez Ledesma	Independent	Extremadura	October 1, 1813 – October 31, 1813
38th	Francisco Tacón Rossique	Independent	Murcia	November 1, 1813 – January 15, 1814
39th	Jeronimo Antonio Díez Baras	Independent	Salamanca	January 16, 1814 – February 15, 1814
40th	Antonio Joaquín Pérez Martínez Robles	Independent	New Spain (Puebla de los Ángeles)	February 16, 1814 – February 25, 1814
41st	Vicente Ruiz Albillos	Independent	Salamanca	February 25, 1814 – March 31, 1814
42nd	Francisco Antonio de la Dueña y Cisneros	Independent	Principality of Catalonia	April 1, 1814 – April 30, 1814
43rd	Antonio Joaquín Pérez Martínez Robles	Independent	New Spain (Puebla de los Ángeles)	May 1, 1814 – May 10, 1814
Parliament dissolved between 1814 and 1820
44th	José de Espiga y Gadea	Independent	Principality of Catalonia	July 6, 1820 – August 9, 1820
45th	Ramón Giraldo y Arquellada	Independent	La Mancha	August 9, 1820 – September 8, 1820
46th	José María Queipo de Llano Ruiz de Saravia	Independent	Asturias	September 9, 1820 – October 8, 1820
47th	José María Calatrava y Peinado	Independent	Extremadura	October 9, 1820 – November 9, 1820
48th	Vicente Cano Manuel y Ramírez de Arellano	Independent	Murcia	February 25, 1821 – March 31, 1821
49th	José María Gutiérrez de Terán	Independent	New Spain	April 1, 1821 – April 30, 1821
50th	Antonio de la Cuesta y Torre	Independent	Ávila	May 1, 1821 – May 31, 1821
51st	Jose María Moscoso de Altamira Quiroga	Independent	Galicia	June 1, 1821 – June 30, 1821
52nd	Pedro González Vallejo	Independent	Soria	September 24, 1821 – October 27, 1821
53rd	Francisco Martínez de la Rosa	Independent	Granada	October 28, 1821 – November 27, 1821
54th	Diego Clemencín	Independent	Murcia	November 28, 1821 – December 27, 1821
55th	Joaquín Rey Esteve	Independent	Principality of Catalonia	December 28, 1821 – January 27, 1822
56th	Ramón Giraldo y Arquellada	Independent	La Mancha	January 28, 1822 – February 14, 1822
57th	Rafael del Riego y Florez Valdes	Independent	Asturias	February 15, 1822 – March 31, 1822
58th	Cayetano Valdés y Flores	Independent	Seville	April 1, 1822 – April 30, 1822
59th	Miguel Ricardo de Álava y Esquivel	Independent	Álava*	May 1, 1822 – May 31, 1822
60th	Álvaro Gómez Becerra	Independent	Cáceres	June 1, 1822 – June 30, 1822
61st	Ramón Salvato de Esteve	Independent	Principality of Catalonia	October 3, 1822 – November 6, 1822
62nd	Diego Vicente Cañas Portocarrero	Independent	Valladolid	November 7, 1822 – December 6, 1822
63rd	Juan Oliver y García	Independent	Málaga	December 7, 1822 – January 6, 1823
64th	Francisco Javier Istúriz y Montero	Independent	Cádiz	January 7, 1823 – February 6, 1823
65th	Domingo María Ruiz de la Vega Méndez	Independent	Granada	February 7, 1823 – February 19, 1823
66th	Manuel Flores Calderón	Independent	Burgos	February 25, 1823 – March 22, 1823
66th	Manuel Flores Calderón	Independent	Burgos	March 23, 1823 – May 1, 1823
67th	Joaquín María Ferrer y Cafranga	Independent	Gipuzkoa (Santiago de Compostela)	May 1, 1823 – June 1, 1823
68th	Tomás Gener y Buigas	Independent	Cuba	June 1, 1823 – July 6, 1823
69th	Juan Pedro Zulueta y Ceballos	Independent	Cádiz	July 7, 1823 – August 5, 1823
70th	Álvaro Gómez Becerra	Independent	Extremadura	September 7, 1823 – September 27, 1823
Parliament dissolved between 1823 and 1834
-	Antonio Posada Rubín de Celis	Independent-Isabellinos	Murcia	July 20, 1834 – July 28, 1834
71st	Ildefonso Díez de Rivera y Muro	Progressive	Valencia	July 29, 1834 – May 29, 1835
72nd	Francisco Javier Istúriz y Montero	Moderate	Cádiz	November 12, 1835 – November 20, 1835
72nd	Francisco Javier Istúriz y Montero	Moderate	Cádiz	November 21, 1835 – January 27, 1836
72nd	Francisco Javier Istúriz y Montero	Moderate	Cádiz	March 17, 1836 – March 22, 1836
73rd	Antonio González González	Progressive	Badajoz	March 23, 1836 – May 23, 1836
74th	Álvaro Gómez Becerra	Progressive	Cáceres	October 17, 1836 – October 20, 1836
74th	Álvaro Gómez Becerra	Progressive	Cáceres	October 21, 1836 – November 30, 1836
75th	Antonio González González	Progressive	Badajoz	December 1, 1836 – January 1, 1837
76th	Joaquín María Ferrer y Cafranga	Progressive	Gipuzkoa	January 2, 1837 – January 31, 1837
77th	Miguel Antonio de Zumalacárregui e Imaz	Progressive	Gipuzkoa	February 1, 1837 – February 28, 1837
78th	Ramón Salvato de Esteve	Moderate	Barcelona	March 1, 1837 – March 31, 1837
79th	Pedro Antonio Acuña y Cuadros	Progressive	Jaén	April 1, 1837 – April 30, 1837
80th	Martín de los Heros y de las Bárcenas	Progressive	Biscay	May 1, 1837 – May 31, 1837
81st	Agustín Argüelles Álvarez González	Progressive	Madrid	June 1, 1837 – June 30, 1837
82nd	Vicente Sancho y Cobertores	Progressive	Castellón	July 1, 1837 – July 31, 1837
83rd	Miguel Calderón de la Barca	Moderate	Madrid	August 1, 1837 – August 31, 1837
84th	Antonio Seoane Hoyos	Progressive	Seville	September 1, 1837 – September 30, 1837
85th	Juan Bautista Muguiro e Iribarren	Progressive	Navarra	October 1, 1837 – October 31, 1837
86th	Joaquín María López y López	Progressive	Madrid	November 1, 1837 – November 4, 1837
87th	Joaquín José de Muro y Bidaurreta	Moderate	Soria	November 13, 1837 – November 17, 1837
87th	Joaquín José de Muro y Bidaurreta	Moderate	Soria	November 18, 1837 – January 1, 1838
88th	Manuel Barrio Ayuso	Moderate	Soria	January 2, 1838 – January 31, 1838
89th	Manuel de la Rivaherrera y Vivanco	Moderate	Burgos	February 1, 1838 – February 15, 1838
90th	Manuel Barrio Ayuso	Moderate	Soria	February 16, 1838 – July 17, 1838
91st	Francisco Javier Istúriz y Montero	Moderate	Cádiz	November 9, 1838 – June 1, 1839
-	Miguel Antonio de Zumalacárregui e Imaz	Progressive	Gipuzkoa (Santiago de Compostela)	September 1, 1839 – September 9, 1839
92nd	José María Calatrava y Peinado	Progressive	Madrid	September 10, 1839 – November 18, 1839
-	Álvaro Flórez Estrada	Progressive	Oviedo	February 18, 1840 – March 17, 1840
93rd	Francisco Javier Istúriz y Montero	Moderate	Cádiz	March 18, 1840 – October 11, 1840
-	Román Martínez de Montaos	Progressive	Oviedo	March 19, 1841 – March 27, 1841
94th	Agustín Argüelles Álvarez González	Progressive	Madrid	March 28, 1841 – August 24, 1841
95th	Pedro Antonio Acuña y Cuadros	Progressive	Soria	December 27, 1841 – December 28, 1841
95th	Pedro Antonio Acuña y Cuadros	Progressive	Soria	December 29, 1841 – July 16, 1842
96th	Salustiano de Olózaga y Almandoz	Progressive	Logroño	November 15, 1842 – January 3, 1843
-	Ramón Giraldo y Arquellada	Progressive	Albacete	April 3, 1843 – April 30, 1843
97th	Manuel Cortina y Arenzana	Progressive	Seville	April 30, 1843 – May 26, 1843
98th	Salustiano de Olózaga y Almandoz	Progressive	Logroño	November 4, 1843 – November 26, 1843
99th	Pedro José Pidal	Moderate	Oviedo	November 27, 1843 – July 4, 1844
100th	Francisco de Paula Castro y Orozco	Moderate	Jaén	October 17, 1844 – May 23, 1845
100th	Francisco de Paula Castro y Orozco	Moderate	Jaén	December 16, 1845 – October 31, 1846
-	Modesto Cortázar y Leal de Ibarra	Progressive	Zamora	January 1, 1847 – January 20, 1847
101st	Francisco de Paula Castro y Orozco	Moderate	Girona	January 21, 1847 – October 5, 1847
102nd	Alejandro Mon y Menéndez	Moderate	Oviedo	November 16, 1847 – March 26, 1848
-	Manuel Seijas Lozano	Moderate	Ourense	December 16, 1848 – December 19, 1848
103rd	Luis Mayans y Enríquez de Navarra	Moderate	Valencia	December 20, 1848 – July 14, 1849
103rd	Luis Mayans y Enríquez de Navarra	Moderate	Valencia	October 30, 1849 – November 1, 1849
103rd	Luis Mayans y Enríquez de Navarra	Moderate	Valencia	November 2, 1849 – August 4, 1850
103rd	Luis Mayans y Enríquez de Navarra	Moderate	Valencia	November 1, 1850 – November 7, 1850
103rd	Luis Mayans y Enríquez de Navarra	Moderate	Valencia	November 8, 1850 – April 7, 1851
103rd	Luis Mayans y Enríquez de Navarra	Moderate	Valencia	June 1, 1851 – June 11, 1851
103rd	Luis Mayans y Enríquez de Navarra	Moderate	Valencia	June 12, 1851 – January 7, 1852
104th	Francisco Martínez de la Rosa	Moderate	Granada	December 1, 1852 – December 2, 1852
104th	Francisco Martínez de la Rosa	Moderate	Granada	March 1, 1853 – March 16, 1853
104th	Francisco Martínez de la Rosa	Moderate	Granada	March 17, 1853 – April 9, 1853
104th	Francisco Martínez de la Rosa	Moderate	Granada	November 19, 1853 – December 10, 1853
-	Evaristo Fernández San Miguel y Valledor	Progressive	Oviedo	November 10, 1854 – November 27, 1854
105th	Baldomero Espartero	Progressive	Logroño	November 28, 1854 – December 4, 1854
106th	Pascual Madoz	Progressive	Lleida	December 5, 1854 – January 24, 1855
107th	Facundo Infante Chacón	Progressive	Badajoz	January 25, 1855 – September 15, 1856
108th	Francisco Martínez de la Rosa	Moderate	Granada	May 1, 1857 – May 8, 1857
108th	Francisco Martínez de la Rosa	Moderate	Granada	May 9, 1857 – July 16, 1857
109th	Juan Bravo Murillo	Moderate	Badajoz	January 11, 1858 – May 13, 1858
110th	Francisco Martínez de la Rosa	Moderate	Granada	December 2, 1858 – December 12, 1858
110th	Francisco Martínez de la Rosa	Moderate	Granada	December 13, 1858 – January 27, 1860
110th	Francisco Martínez de la Rosa	Moderate	Granada	May 26, 1860 – September 28, 1861
110th	Francisco Martínez de la Rosa	Moderate	Granada	November 9, 1861 – February 7, 1862†
-	Modesto Lafuente y Zamalloa (Vice President of the Congress of Deputies)	Liberal Union	León	February 7, 1862 – February 18, 1862
111th	Alejandro Mon y Menéndez	Moderate	Oviedo	February 19, 1862 – October 31, 1862
112th	Diego López Ballesteros Pérez Santamaría	Moderate	Oviedo	December 2, 1862 – August 12, 1863
113th	Antonio de los Ríos Rosas	Liberal Union	Málaga/Cádiz	November 5, 1863 – November 24, 1863
113th	Antonio de los Ríos Rosas	Liberal Union	Málaga/Cádiz	November 25, 1863 – June 23, 1864
114th	Alejandro de Castro y Casal	Moderate	Pontevedra	December 23, 1864 – January 4, 1865
114th	Alejandro de Castro y Casal	Moderate	Pontevedra	January 5, 1865 – February 20, 1865
-	Martín Belda y Mencia del Barrio	Liberal Union	Córdoba	February 21, 1865 – March 7, 1865
115th	Fernando Álvarez Martínez	Moderate	Burgos	March 8, 1865 – July 12, 1865
116th	Antonio de los Ríos Rosas	Liberal Union	Málaga	December 28, 1865 – January 3, 1866
116th	Antonio de los Ríos Rosas	Liberal Union	Málaga	January 4, 1866 – October 2, 1866
117th	Martín Belda y Mencia del Barrio	Liberal Union	Córdoba	March 30, 1867 – April 3, 1867
117th	Martín Belda y Mencia del Barrio	Liberal Union	Córdoba	April 4, 1867 – December 3, 1867
118th	Luis José Sartorius y Tapia	Moderate	Cuenca	December 28, 1867 – December 3, 1868
119th	Nicolás María Rivero	Progressive	Madrid	February 12, 1869 – February 19, 1869
119th	Nicolás María Rivero	Progressive	Madrid	February 20, 1869 – January 17, 1870
120th	Manuel Ruiz Zorrilla	Radical-Democratic	Madrid	January 17, 1870 – January 2, 1871
121st	Salustiano de Olózaga y Almandoz	Constitutionalist	Logroño	April 4, 1871 – May 12, 1871
121st	Salustiano de Olózaga y Almandoz	Constitutionalist	Logroño	May 13, 1871 – October 2, 1871
122nd	Práxedes Mateo Sagasta	Constitutionalist	Madrid	October 3, 1871 – January 6, 1872
123rd	Antonio de los Ríos Rosas	Liberal Union	Málaga	April 25, 1872 – May 9, 1872
123rd	Antonio de los Ríos Rosas	Liberal Union	Málaga	May 10, 1872 – June 28, 1872
124th	Nicolás María Rivero	Constitutionalist	Madrid/Seville	September 16, 1872 – September 25, 1872
124th	Nicolás María Rivero	Constitutionalist	Madrid/Seville	September 26, 1872 – February 11, 1873
125th	Cristino Martos y Balbí	Radical-Democratic	Madrid	February 12, 1873 – March 18, 1873
126th	Francisco Salmerón y Alonso	Federal Democratic Republican	Almería	March 19, 1873 – March 22, 1873
127th	José María Orense Milá de Aragón Herrero	Federal Democratic Republican	Palencia	June 1, 1873 – June 6, 1873
127th	José María Orense Milá de Aragón Herrero	Federal Democratic Republican	Palencia	June 7, 1873 – June 12, 1873
128th	Nicolás Salmerón y Alonso	Federal Democratic Republican	Almería	June 13, 1873 – August 24, 1873
129th	Emilio Castelar	Federal Democratic Republican	Huelva	August 25, 1873 – September 8, 1873
130th	Nicolás Salmerón y Alonso	Federal Democratic Republican	Almería	September 9, 1873 – January 8, 1874
131st	José Posada Herrera	Liberal	Oviedo	February 16, 1876 – February 25, 1876
131st	José Posada Herrera	Liberal	Oviedo	February 26, 1876 – January 5, 1877
131st	José Posada Herrera	Liberal	Oviedo	April 26, 1877 – July 11, 1877
131st	José Posada Herrera	Liberal	Oviedo	January 10, 1878 – January 28, 1878
132nd	Adelardo López de Ayala y Herrera	Conservative	Badajoz/Madrid	February 16, 1878 – December 30, 1878
132nd	Adelardo López de Ayala y Herrera	Conservative	Badajoz/Madrid	June 2, 1879 – June 23, 1879
132nd	Adelardo López de Ayala y Herrera	Conservative	Badajoz/Madrid	June 24, 1879 – December 30, 1879†
-	José Moreno Nieto (Vice President of the Congress of Deputies)	Liberal	Badajoz	December 30, 1879 – January 21, 1880
133rd	Francisco de Borja Queipo de Llano	Conservative	Oviedo	January 21, 1880 – September 16, 1880
133rd	Francisco de Borja Queipo de Llano	Conservative	Oviedo	December 31, 1880 – June 25, 1881
134th	José Posada Herrera	Liberal	Madrid/Oviedo	September 21, 1881 – October 19, 1881
134th	José Posada Herrera	Liberal	Madrid/Oviedo	October 20, 1881 – November 16, 1882
134th	José Posada Herrera	Liberal	Madrid/Oviedo	December 4, 1882 – July 26, 1883
135th	Práxedes Mateo Sagasta	Liberal	Zamora	December 17, 1883 – March 31, 1884
136th	Francisco de Borja Queipo de Llano	Conservative	Oviedo	May 21, 1884 – June 8, 1884
136th	Francisco de Borja Queipo de Llano	Conservative	Oviedo	June 9, 1884 – July 11, 1885
137th	Antonio Cánovas del Castillo	Conservative	Madrid	December 26, 1885 – March 8, 1886
138th	Cristino Martos y Balbí	Liberal	Valencia	May 10, 1886 – June 10, 1886
138th	Cristino Martos y Balbí	Liberal	Valencia	June 11, 1886 – December 24, 1886
138th	Cristino Martos y Balbí	Liberal	Valencia	January 17, 1887 – November 3, 1887
138th	Cristino Martos y Balbí	Liberal	Valencia	December 2, 1887 – November 6, 1888
138th	Cristino Martos y Balbí	Liberal	Valencia	November 30, 1888 – June 3, 1889
139th	Manuel Alonso Martínez	Liberal	Burgos	June 14, 1889 – December 29, 1890
140th	Alejandro Pidal y Mon	Conservative	Oviedo	March 3, 1891 – April 19, 1891
140th	Alejandro Pidal y Mon	Conservative	Oviedo	April 20, 1891 – January 5, 1893
141st	Antonio Aguilar y Correa	Liberal	Córdoba	April 6, 1893 – May 7, 1893
141st	Antonio Aguilar y Correa	Liberal	Córdoba	May 8, 1893 – October 16, 1894
141st	Antonio Aguilar y Correa	Liberal	Córdoba	November 12, 1894 – July 1, 1895
142nd	Alejandro Pidal y Mon	Conservative	Oviedo	May 12, 1896 – June 15, 1896
142nd	Alejandro Pidal y Mon	Conservative	Oviedo	June 16, 1896 – February 26, 1898
143rd	Antonio Aguilar y Correa	Liberal	Córdoba	April 21, 1898 – April 24, 1898
143rd	Antonio Aguilar y Correa	Liberal	Córdoba	April 25, 1898 – March 16, 1899
144th	Alejandro Pidal y Mon	Conservative	Oviedo	June 3, 1899 – June 15, 1899
144th	Alejandro Pidal y Mon	Conservative	Oviedo	June 16, 1899 – October 18, 1900
145th	Raimundo Fernández Villaverde y García Rivero	Conservative	Pontevedra	November 20, 1900 – April 25, 1901
146th	Antonio Aguilar y Correa	Liberal	Córdoba	June 12, 1901 – July 1, 1901
146th	Antonio Aguilar y Correa	Liberal	Córdoba	July 2, 1901 – July 14, 1901
147th	Segismundo Moret	Liberal	Zaragoza	July 15, 1901 – April 3, 1902
148th	Antonio Aguilar y Correa	Liberal	Córdoba	April 3, 1902 – March 26, 1903
149th	Raimundo Fernández Villaverde y García Rivero	Conservative	Pontevedra	May 19, 1903 – June 17, 1903
149th	Raimundo Fernández Villaverde y García Rivero	Conservative	Pontevedra	June 18, 1903 – July 18, 1903
150th	Francisco Romero Robledo	Conservative	Málaga	October 20, 1903 – September 12, 1904
150th	Francisco Romero Robledo	Conservative	Málaga	October 3, 1904 – August 17, 1905
151st	Antonio Aguilar y Correa	Liberal	Córdoba	October 12, 1905 – November 17, 1905
151st	Antonio Aguilar y Correa	Liberal	Córdoba	November 18, 1905 – January 18, 1906
152nd	José Canalejas y Méndez	Liberal	Alicante/Ciudad Real	January 19, 1906 – March 3, 1907
153rd	Eduardo Dato Iradier	Conservative	León	May 14, 1907 – June 5, 1907
153rd	Eduardo Dato Iradier	Conservative	León	June 6, 1907 – September 13, 1908
153rd	Eduardo Dato Iradier	Conservative	León	October 12, 1908 – September 27, 1909
153rd	Eduardo Dato Iradier	Conservative	León	October 15, 1909 – April 14, 1910
154th	Álvaro de Figueroa y Torres	Liberal	Guadalajara	June 16, 1910 – June 29, 1910
154th	Álvaro de Figueroa y Torres	Liberal	Guadalajara	June 30, 1910 – February 17, 1911
154th	Álvaro de Figueroa y Torres	Liberal	Guadalajara	March 6, 1911 – November 18, 1912
155th	Segismundo Moret	Liberal	Granada	November 19, 1912 – January 28, 1913†
-	Antonio Aura Boronat (Vice President of the Congress of Deputies)	Liberal	Huesca	January 28, 1913 – May 27, 1913
156th	Miguel Villanueva y Gómez	Liberal	Logroño	May 27, 1913 – January 2, 1914
157th	Augusto González Besada	Conservative	Alicante	April 3, 1914 – April 27, 1914
157th	Augusto González Besada	Conservative	Alicante	April 28, 1914 – October 28, 1915
157th	Augusto González Besada	Conservative	Alicante	November 5, 1915 – March 16, 1916
158th	Miguel Villanueva y Gómez	Liberal	Logroño	May 11, 1916 – May 28, 1916
158th	Miguel Villanueva y Gómez	Liberal	Logroño	May 29, 1916 – January 23, 1917
158th	Miguel Villanueva y Gómez	Liberal	Logroño	January 29, 1917 – January 10, 1918
158th	Miguel Villanueva y Gómez	Liberal	Logroño	March 19, 1918 – April 7, 1918
158th	Miguel Villanueva y Gómez	Liberal	Logroño	April 8, 1918 – May 2, 1919
-	Juan Armada y Losada	Conservative	A Coruña	June 25, 1919 – July 27, 1919
159th	José Sánchez-Guerra y Martínez	Conservative	Córdoba	July 28, 1919 – October 2, 1920
159th	José Sánchez-Guerra y Martínez	Conservative	Córdoba	January 5, 1921 – February 21, 1921
159th	José Sánchez-Guerra y Martínez	Conservative	Córdoba	February 22, 1921 – February 21, 1922
159th	José Sánchez-Guerra y Martínez	Conservative	Córdoba	March 1, 1922 – March 14, 1922
160th	Gabino Bugallal Araújo	Conservative	Ourense	March 15, 1922 – April 5, 1923
161st	Melquíades Álvarez y González Posada	Liberal	Oviedo	May 25, 1923 – June 11, 1923
161st	Melquíades Álvarez y González Posada	Liberal	Oviedo	June 12, 1923 – September 15, 1923
Parliament dissolved between 1923 and 1927
162nd	José María Yanguas y Messía	Patriotic Union	-	October 10, 1927 – July 6, 1929
Parliament dissolved between 1929 and 1931
163rd	Julián Besteiro	Socialist	Madrid	July 14, 1931 – July 26, 1931
163rd	Julián Besteiro	Socialist	Madrid	July 27, 1931 – October 9, 1933
164th	Santiago Alba y Bonifaz	Radical Republican	Zamora	December 8, 1933 – December 27, 1933
164th	Santiago Alba y Bonifaz	Radical Republican	Zamora	December 28, 1933 – January 7, 1936
165th	Diego Martínez Barrio	Republican Union	Madrid	March 16, 1936 – April 2, 1936
165th	Diego Martínez Barrio	Republican Union	Madrid	April 3, 1936 – March 31, 1939
Parliament dissolved between 1939 and 1943
166th	Esteban de Bilbao Eguía	National Movement	-	March 16, 1943 – September 29, 1965
167th	Antonio Iturmendi Bañales	National Movement	-	September 30, 1965 – November 26, 1969
168th	Alejandro Rodríguez de Valcárcel	National Movement	-	November 27, 1969 – December 5, 1975
169th	Torcuato Fernández-Miranda	National Movement	-	December 6, 1975 – June 30, 1977
-	Antonio Hernández Gil; President of the Realm's Council and Parliament	Independent	-	June 15, 1977 – December 29, 1978
170th	Fernando Álvarez de Miranda	Democratic Centre Union	Palencia	July 13, 1977 – October 17, 1977
170th	Fernando Álvarez de Miranda	Democratic Centre Union	Palencia	October 18, 1977 – March 22, 1979
171st	Landelino Lavilla	Democratic Centre Union	Madrid	March 23, 1979 – May 2, 1979
171st	Landelino Lavilla	Democratic Centre Union	Madrid	May 3, 1979 – November 17, 1982
172nd	Gregorio Peces-Barba	Socialist	Valladolid	November 18, 1982 – July 14, 1986
173rd	Félix Pons	Socialist	Balearic Islands	July 15, 1986 – November 20, 1989
173rd	Félix Pons	Socialist	Balearic Islands	November 21, 1989 – June 28, 1993
173rd	Félix Pons	Socialist	Balearic Islands	June 29, 1993 – March 26, 1996
174th	Federico Trillo	Popular	Alicante	March 27, 1996 – April 4, 2000
175th	Luisa Fernanda Rudi Ubeda	Popular	Zaragoza	April 5, 2000 – April 1, 2004
176th	Manuel Marín	Socialist	Ciudad Real	April 2, 2004 – March 31, 2008
177th	José Bono	Socialist	Toledo	April 1, 2008 – December 12, 2011
178th	Jesús Posada	Popular	Soria	December 13, 2011 – January 12, 2016
179th	Patxi López	Socialist	Biscay	January 13, 2016 – July 18, 2016
180th	Ana Pastor Julián	Popular	Madrid	July 19, 2016 – May 20, 2019
181st	Meritxell Batet	Socialist	Barcelona	May 21, 2019 – December 2, 2019
181st	Meritxell Batet	Socialist	Barcelona	December 3, 2019 – August 16, 2023
182nd	Francina Armengol	Socialist	Balearic Islands	August 17, 2023 – present
Acting • † Death in office • Independent (73) • Progressive (29) • Moderate (24) • Liberal Union (6) • Radical-Democratic (2) • Constitutionalist (3) • Federal Democratic Republican (5) • Liberal (19) • Conservative (15) • Patriotic Union (1) • Socialist (8) • Radical Republican (1) • Republican Union (1) • National Movement (4) • Democratic Centre Union (2) • Popular (4)

== Presidents by time in office ==
The length of time given below is based on the difference between dates. Many presidents were elected multiple times, and to terms that were, in several instances, not consecutive; the length of time given for each president measures their cumulative length of incumbency as president (even if they were elected as acting president). The time after adjournment of one Congress but before the convening of the next Congress is also counted.

Coat of Arms of the Spanish Congress of Deputies

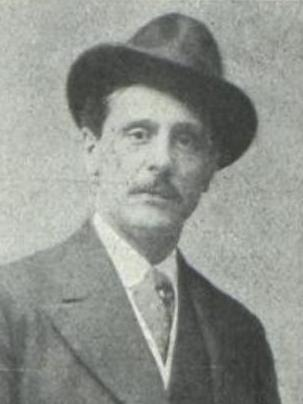
Esteban de Bilbao Eguía, longest serving president of the Congress, 22 years, 197 days

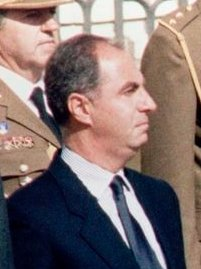
Félix Pons, longest tenure of office in the current democratic period, 9 years, 255 days

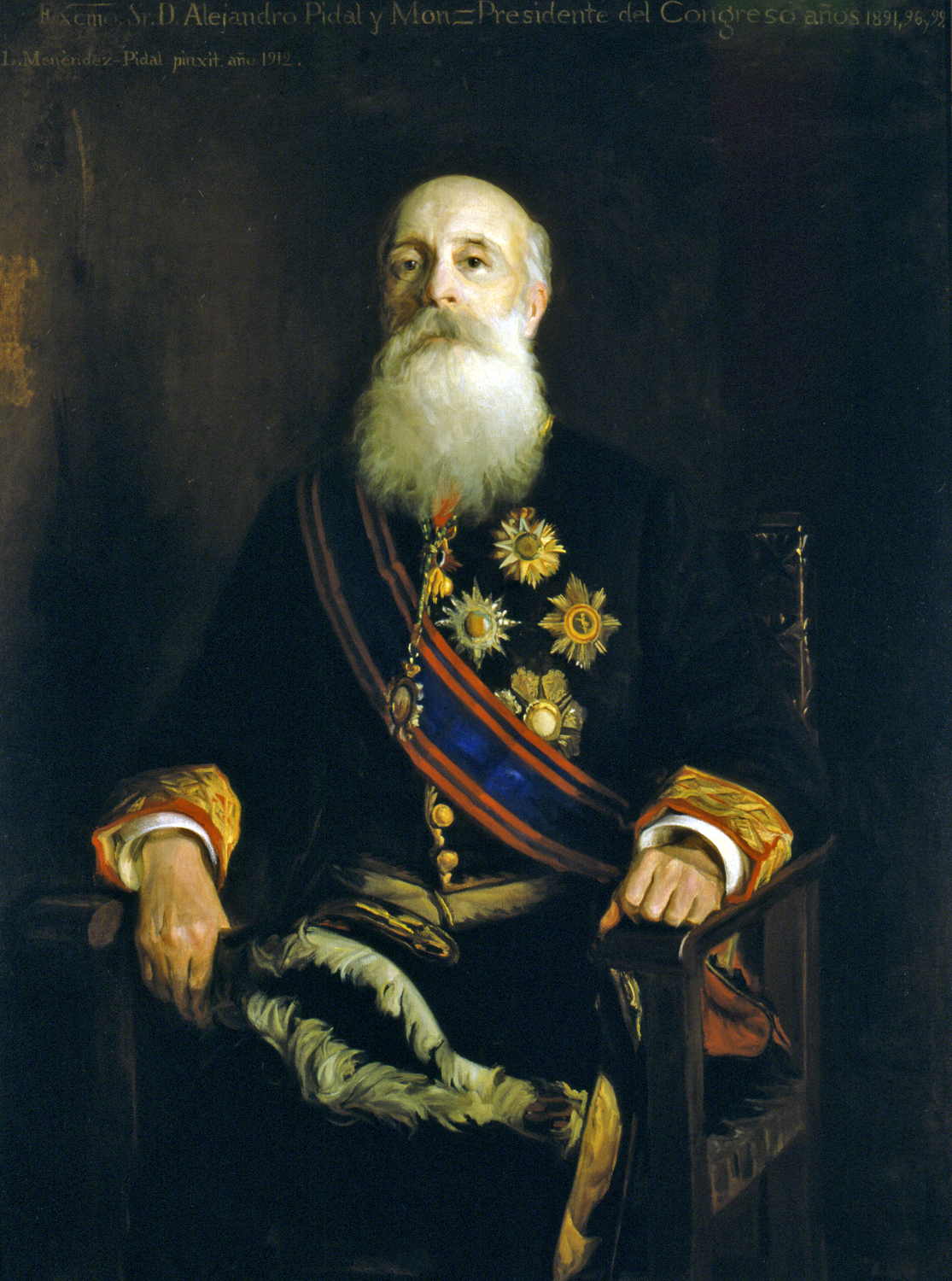
Alejandro Pidal y Mon, longest tenure of office in the 19th century, 5 years, 5 days (non-consecutive)

Rank	Name	Time in office	Year(s) in which elected
1	Esteban de Bilbao Eguía	22 years, 197 days	1943
2	Félix Pons	9 years, 255 days	1986; 1989; 1993
3	Alejandro Rodríguez de Valcárcel	6 years, 8 days	1969
4	Alejandro Pidal y Mon	5 years, 5 days	1891; 1896; 1899
5	Francisco Martínez de la Rosa	4 years, 182 days	1821; 1852; 1853; 1857; 1858
6	Meritxell Batet	4 years, 87 days	2019
7	Antonio Aguilar y Correa	4 years, 74 days	1893; 1894; 1898; 1901; 1902; 1905
8	Antonio Iturmendi Bañales	4 years, 57 days	1965
9	Jesús Posada	4 years, 30 days	2011
10	Federico Trillo	4 years, 8 days	1996
11	Manuel Marín	3 years, 364 days	2004
12	Luisa Fernanda Rudi Ubeda	3 years, 362 days	2000
13	José Posada Herrera	3 years, 320 days	1876; 1877; 1878; 1881; 1882
14	José Bono	3 years, 255 days	2008
15	Landelino Lavilla	3 years, 239 days	1979
16	Gregorio Peces-Barba	3 years, 238 days	1982
17	Miguel Villanueva y Gómez	3 years, 211 days	1913; 1916; 1917; 1918
18	Francina Armengol	3 years, 79 days	2023
19	Cristino Martos y Balbí	3 years, 58 days	1873; 1886; 1887; 1888
20	Luis Mayans y Enríquez de Navarra	3 years, 18 days	1848; 1848; 1850; 1851
21	Diego Martínez Barrio	3 years, 15 days	1936
22	Eduardo Dato Iradier	2 years, 335 days	1907; 1908; 1909
23	Ana Pastor Julián	2 years, 305 days	2016
24	Francisco de Paula Castro y Orozco	2 years, 271 days	1844; 1845; 1847
25	José Sánchez-Guerra y Martínez	2 years, 229 days	1919; 1921; 1922
26	Francisco de Borja Queipo de Llano	2 years, 201 days	1880; 1884
27	Álvaro de Figueroa y Torres	2 years, 155 days	1910; 1911
28	Julián Besteiro	2 years, 87 days	1931
29	Santiago Alba y Bonifaz	2 years, 30 days	1933
30	Antonio de los Ríos Rosas	2 years, 17 days	1863; 1865; 1866; 1872
31	Augusto González Besada	1 year, 348 days	1914; 1915
32	Adelardo López de Ayala y Herrera	1 year, 317 days	1878; 1879
33	Francisco Romero Robledo	1 year, 301 days	1903; 1904
34	José María Yanguas y Messía	1 year, 269 days	1927
35	Fernando Álvarez de Miranda	1 year, 252 days	1977
36	Facundo Infante Chacón	1 year, 234 days	1855
37	Francisco Javier Istúriz y Montero	1 year, 207 days	1823; 1835; 1836; 1838; 1840
38	Torcuato Fernández-Miranda	1 year, 206 days	1975
39	Manuel Alonso Martínez	1 year, 198 days	1889
40	Nicolás María Rivero	1 year, 122 days	1869; 1872
41	José Canalejas y Méndez	1 year, 43 days	1906
42	Gabino Bugallal Araújo	1 year, 21 days	1922
13	Alejandro Mon y Menéndez	1 year, 20 days	1847; 1862
44	Manuel Ruiz Zorrilla	349 days	1870
45	Luis José Sartorius y Tapia	341 days	1867
46	Segismundo Moret	332 days	1901; 1912
47	Ildefonso Díez de Rivera y Muro	304 days	1834
48	Martín Belda y Mencia del Barrio	262 days	1865; 1867
49	Diego López Ballesteros Pérez Santamaría	253 days	1862
50	Salustiano de Olózaga y Almandoz	252 days	1842; 1843; 1871
51	Pedro Antonio Acuña y Cuadros	230 days	1837; 1841
52	Pedro José Pidal	220 days	1843
53	Raimundo Fernández Villaverde y García Rivero	216 days	1900; 1903
54	Práxedes Mateo Sagasta	200 days	1871; 1883
55	Nicolás Salmerón y Alonso	193 days	1873 (twice)
56	Patxi López	187 days	2016
57	Manuel Barrio Ayuso	180 days	1838 (twice)
58	Agustín Argüelles Álvarez González	178 days	1837; 1841
59	Fernando Álvarez Martínez	126 days	1865
60	Juan Bravo Murillo	122 days	1858
61	Antonio Aura Boronat	119 days	-
62	Melquíades Álvarez y González Posada	113 days	1923
63	José María Calatrava y Peinado	100 days	1820; 1839
64	Ramón Giraldo y Arquellada	104 days	1811; 1820; 1822; 1843
65	Álvaro Gómez Becerra	93 days	1822; 1823; 1836
66	Antonio González González	92 days	1836 (twice)
67	José María Gutiérrez de Terán	80 days	1812; 1821
68	Francisco Tacón Rossique	75 days	1813
69	Antonio Cánovas del Castillo	72 days	1885
70 (tie)	Manuel Flores Calderón	65 days	1823
70 (tie)	Miguel Antonio de Zumalacárregui e Imaz	65 days	1813; 1837; 1839
71	Ramón Salvato de Esteve	64 days	1822; 1837
72	Vicente Cano Manuel y Ramírez de Arellano	63 days	1811; 1821
73	Joaquín María Ferrer y Cafranga	60 days	1823; 1837
74	Alejandro de Castro y Casal	59 days	1864; 1865
75	Pascual Madoz	50 days	1854
76	Joaquín José de Muro y Bidaurreta	49 days	1837
77	Antonio Joaquín Pérez Martínez Robles	48 days	1811; 1814
78	Rafael del Riego y Florez Valdes	44 days	1822
79	Tomás Gener y Buigas	35 days	1823
80 (tie)	Vicente Ruiz Albillos	34 days	1814
80 (tie)	José de Espiga y Gadea	34 days	1820
81	Pedro González Vallejo	33 days	1821
82 (tie)	José Miguel Gordoa y Barrios	32 days	1813
82 (tie)	Juan Armada y Losada	32 days	1919
83 (tie)	Luis Rodríguez del Monte y del Prado	30 days	1810
83 (tie)	Alonso Cañedo y Vigil	30 days	1810
83 (tie)	Diego Muñoz Torrero y Ramírez	30 days	1811
83 (tie)	José Pablo Valiente y Bravo	30 days	1811
83 (tie)	Juan José Guereña y Garayo	30 days	1811
83 (tie)	Antonio Larrazábal y Arrivillaga	30 days	1811
83 (tie)	Manuel de Villafañe y Andreu	30 days	1811
83 (tie)	Antonio Agustí Payán de Tejada y Figueroa	30 days	1812
83 (tie)	José Miguel Guridi y Alcocer	30 days	1812
83 (tie)	Felipe Vázquez Canga	30 days	1812
83 (tie)	Andrés Ángel de la Vega Infanzón	30 days	1812
83 (tie)	Francisco Morros y Cibila	30 days	1812
83 (tie)	Francisco Ciscar y Ciscar	30 days	1812
83 (tie)	Francisco de Calello Miranda	30 days	1813
83 (tie)	Florencio del Castillo Solano	30 days	1813
83 (tie)	Andrés Morales de los Ríos y Gil	30 days	1813
83 (tie)	Francisco Rodríguez Ledesma	30 days	1813
83 (tie)	Jeronimo Antonio Díez Baras	30 days	1814
83 (tie)	Antonio de la Cuesta y Torre	30 days	1821
83 (tie)	Joaquín Rey Esteve	30 days	1821
83 (tie)	Miguel Ricardo de Álava y Esquivel	30 days	1822
83 (tie)	Juan Oliver y García	30 days	1822
83 (tie)	Martín de los Heros y de las Bárcenas	30 days	1837
83 (tie)	Vicente Sancho y Cobertores	30 days	1837
83 (tie)	Miguel Calderón de la Barca	30 days	1837
83 (tie)	Juan Bautista Muguiro e Iribarren	30 days	1837
84 (tie)	Ramón Lázaro de Dou y de Bassols	29 days	1810
84 (tie)	José Luis Morales Gallego	29 days	1810
84 (tie)	Jaime Creus Martí	29 days	1811
84 (tie)	Bernardo Nadal y Crespí	29 days	1811
84 (tie)	José Casquete de Prado Bootello	29 days	1811
84 (tie)	Juan Polo y Catalina	29 days	1812
84 (tie)	Andrés de Jáuregui de Aróstegui	29 days	1812
84 (tie)	Juan del Valle y Milans del Bosch	29 days	1812
84 (tie)	Pedro José Gordillo y Ramos	29 days	1813
84 (tie)	José Antonio Sombiela y Mestre	29 days	1813
84 (tie)	Francisco Antonio de la Dueña y Cisneros	29 days	1814
84 (tie)	José María Queipo de Llano Ruiz de Saravia	29 days	1820
84 (tie)	Jose María Moscoso de Altamira Quiroga	29 days	1821
84 (tie)	Diego Clemencín	29 days	1821
84 (tie)	Cayetano Valdés y Flores	29 days	1822
84 (tie)	Diego Vicente Cañas Portocarrero	29 days	1822
84 (tie)	Juan Pedro Zulueta y Ceballos	29 days	1823
84 (tie)	Antonio Seoane Hoyos	29 days	1837
85 (tie)	Vicente Pascual y Esteban	28 days	1812
85 (tie)	Álvaro Flórez Estrada	28 days	1840
86 (tie)	Vicente Joaquín Noguera Climent	27 days	1811
86 (tie)	Joaquín Maniau Torquemada	27 days	1813
87	Manuel Cortina y Arenzana	26 days	1843
88	José Moreno Nieto	22 days	-
89	Modesto Cortázar y Leal de Ibarra	19 days	1847
90	Evaristo Fernández San Miguel y Valledor	17 days	1854
91 (tie)	Manuel de la Rivaherrera y Vivanco	14 days	1838
91 (tie)	Emilio Castelar	14 days	1873
92	Domingo María Ruiz de la Vega Méndez	12 days	1823
93 (tie)	Modesto Lafuente y Zamalloa	11 days	-
93 (tie)	José María Orense Milá de Aragón Herrero	11 days	1873
94 (tie)	Antonio Posada Rubín de Celis	8 days	1834
94 (tie)	Román Martínez de Montaos	8 days	1841
95	Baldomero Espartero	6 days	1854
96 (tie)	Joaquín María López y López	3 days	1837
96 (tie)	Manuel Seijas Lozano	3 days	1848
96 (tie)	Francisco Salmerón y Alonso	3 days	1873
97	Benito Ramón Hermida Maldonado	1 day	1810

== See also ==
- List of presidents of the Senate of Spain
