= Pedro González Vallejo =

Spanish Catholic Bishop and politician

The Most Excellent Bishop Emeritus Pedro González Vallejo Bishop of Mallorca
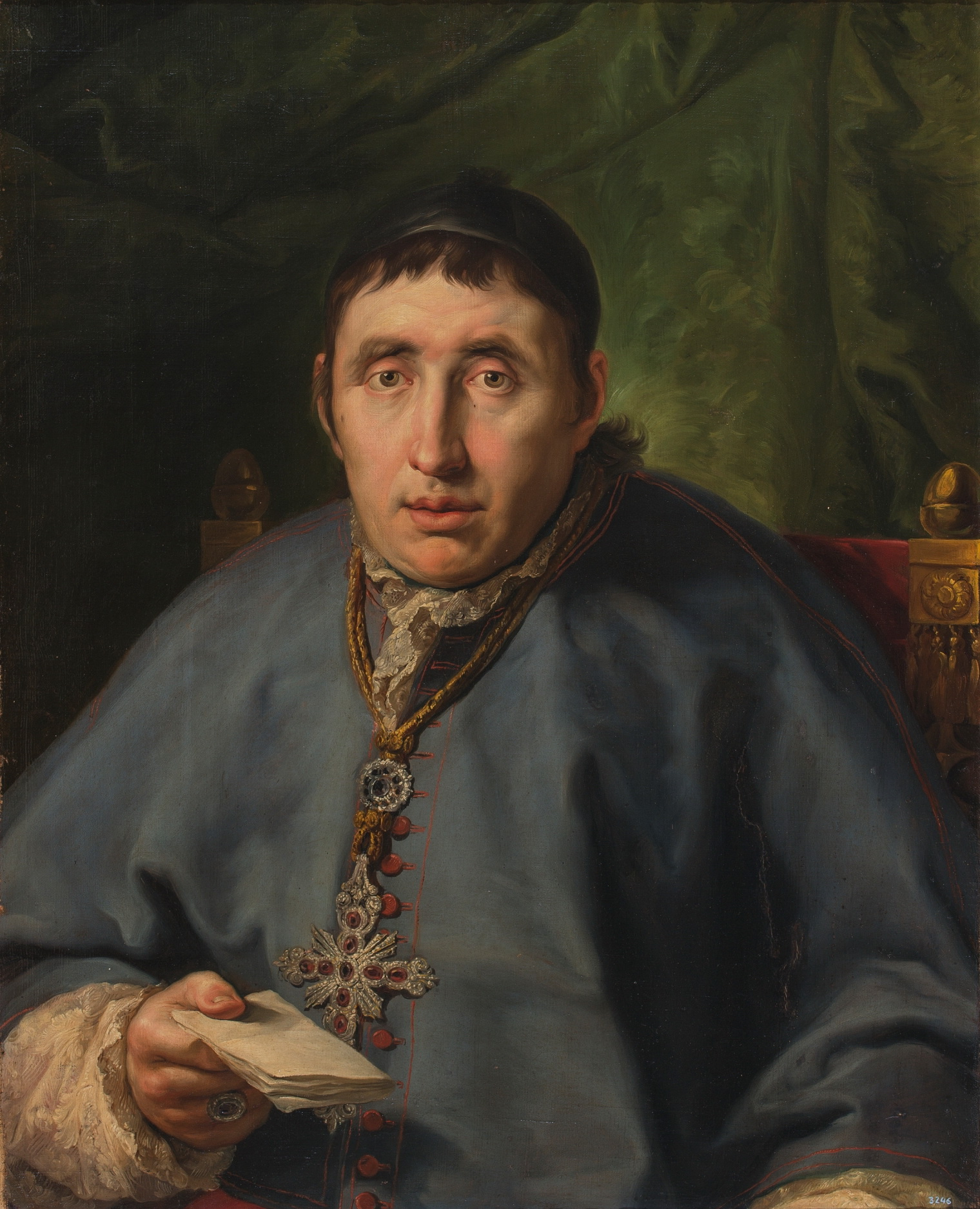
- Portrait by Vicente López Portaña c.1820

3rd President of the Senate
- In office 10 October 1835 – 23 May 1836
- Monarch: Isabella II
- Preceded by: The Duke of Ahumada
- Succeeded by: The Marquess of Miraflores

52nd President of the Congress of Deputies
- In office 24 September 1821 – 27 October 1821
- Monarch: Ferdinand VII
- Preceded by: Jose María Moscoso de Altamira Quiroga
- Succeeded by: Francisco Martínez de la Rosa
- Bishop of Mallorca
- Appointed: 6 August 1819
- Term ended: 25 June 1825
- Predecessor: Bernardo Nadal Crespí
- Successor: Antonio Pérez de Hirias

Personal details
- Born: 22 September 1770 Soto en Cameros, Spain
- Died: 30 April 1842 (aged 71) Madrid, Spain
- Party: Independent
- Education: University of Zaragoza

Pedro González Vallejo (22 September 1770 – 30 April 1842) was a Spanish Catholic Bishop and politician who was Bishop of Mallorca from 1819 until his resignation in 1825. He served as the President of the Senate from 1835 to 1836 and President of the Congress of Deputies in 1821.

== Life and career ==
=== Family and education ===
Vallejo was born on 22 September 1770 in Soto en Cameros to José González and Rosa Vajello Pérez. His parents had married in 1758 and he was the youngest of five children.

His first studies were carried out in his hometown where he obtained a bachelor's degree in law. He continued his studies at the University of Zaragoza where he obtained his degree on 31 January 1792 and his doctorate on 5 February 1792.

=== Church and political career ===
In 1797, Vallejo was named Secretary to José Antonio Sáez de Santamaría who had been appointed Bishop of Sergovia. He became treasurer, vicar and general provisor in 1807. During the French Invasion when the Bishop retired he was appointed ecclesiastical governor until 1814.

On 6 August 1819, Vallejo was selected the Bishop of Mallorca, he was confirmed on 27 September and ordained Bishop of 12 December. He moved to the city on 29 January 1820. He carried out pastoral work, such as in 1821 during the epidemic in Palma.

Vallejo was elected Member of the Congress of Deputies for Soria in 1820 and was elected president for a month from September to October 1821. He then returned to his diocese and after the invasion of the Duke of Angoulême, he emigrated to France to avoid being persecuted as a constitutionalist. He left Palma by boat on 21 September and firstly settled in Marseille where his nephew was and later in the Aix-en-Provence. He returned to Spain in 1832 and in 1834 was appointed Member of the Ecclesiastical Board.

Vallejo served as President of the Senate from 1835 to 1836 and was appointed Senator for Logroño, a position which he remained in until his death.

=== Death ===
Vallejo died on 30 April 1842 in Madrid, at the age of 71 after suffering a stroke and is buried in the San Isidro Cemetery.

== Honours ==
- Grand Cross of Charles III

== See also ==
- List of presidents of the Congress of Deputies of Spain
- List of presidents of the Senate of Spain
