= Cortes Generales =

Bicameral legislature of Spain

Cortes Generales Co-official languages Basque: Gorte Nagusiak Catalan: Corts Generals Galician: Cortes Xerais Occitan: Corts Generaus
- 15th Cortes Generales

Type
- Type: Bicameral
- Houses: Senate; Congress of Deputies

Leadership
- President of the Senate: Pedro Manuel Rollán Ojeda (PP) since 17 August 2023
- President of the Congress of Deputies: Francesca Lluc Armengol Socias (PSOE) since 17 August 2023

Structure
- Seats: 616; 266 senators 350 deputies
- Senate political groups: Government (92): PSOE (89); Confederal Left group (2) (Note: PSOE (1); Pacte Progressista (1)); Basque group (1) (Note: PSOE (1)); Supported by (20): Republican group (9) (Note: ERC (4); EH Bildu (5)); Basque group (5) (Note: PNV (5)); Confederal Left group (4) (Note: Compromís (1); MM (1); GBai (1); ASG (1)); BNG (1); CC (1); Opposition (154): PP (145); Junts (4); Vox (3); UPN (1); AHI (1)
- Congress of Deputies political groups: Government (147): PSOE (121); Sumar (26) (Note: SMR (10); CatComú (6); IU (5); MM (2); Compromís (1) (Note: IdPV (1)); CHA (1); Més (1)); Supported by (24): ERC (7); EH Bildu (6); EAJ/PNV (5); Podemos (4); BNG (1); Compromís (1) (Note: Més (1)); Opposition (179): PP (137); Vox (33); Junts (7); UPN (1); CCa (1)

Elections
- First Senate election: 8–15 March 1871
- First Congress of Deputies election: January–September 1810
- Last Senate election: 23 July 2023
- Last Congress of Deputies election: 23 July 2023

Meeting place
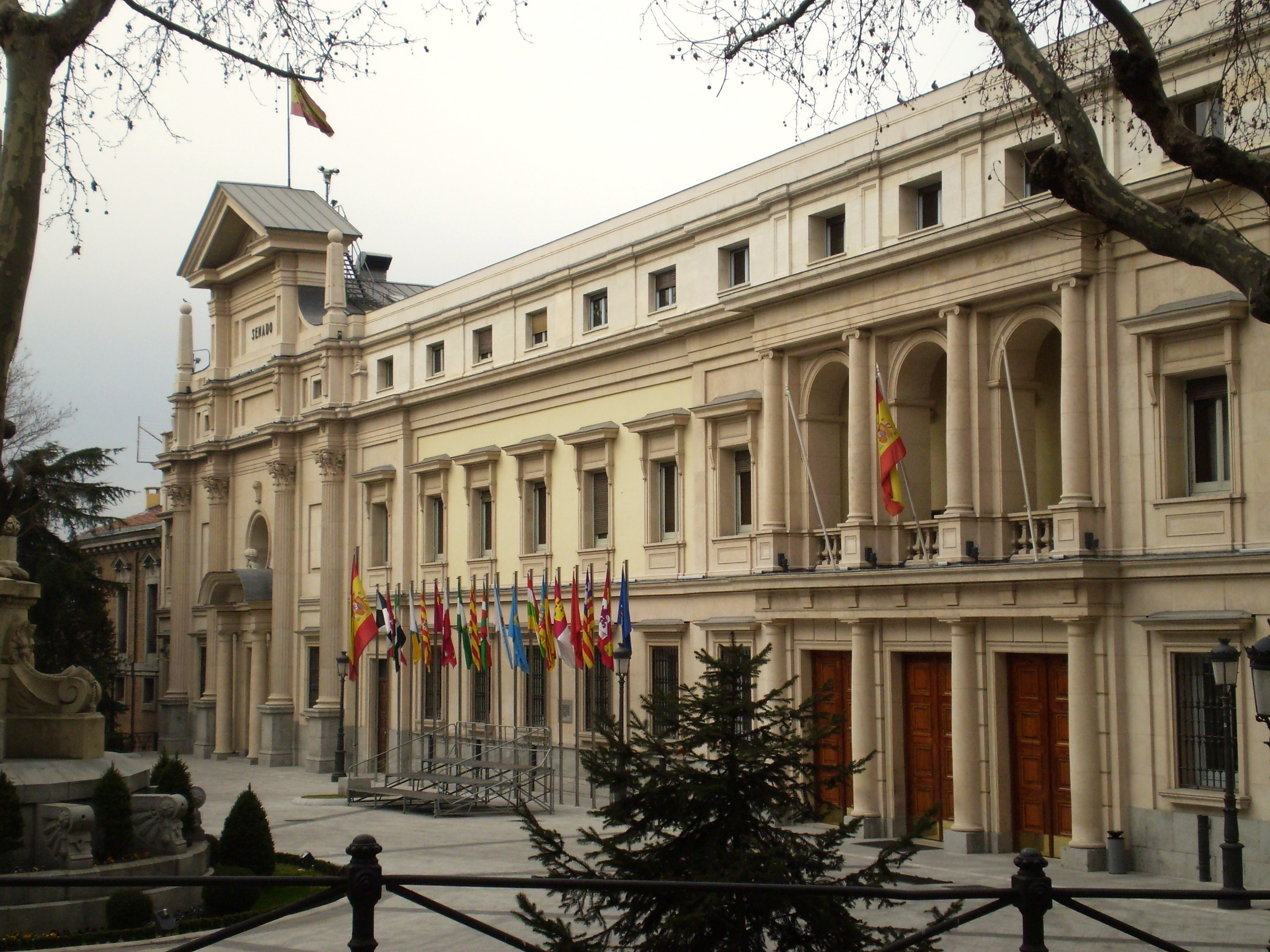
- Senate; Palacio del Senado; Plaza de la Marina Española; Centro, Madrid
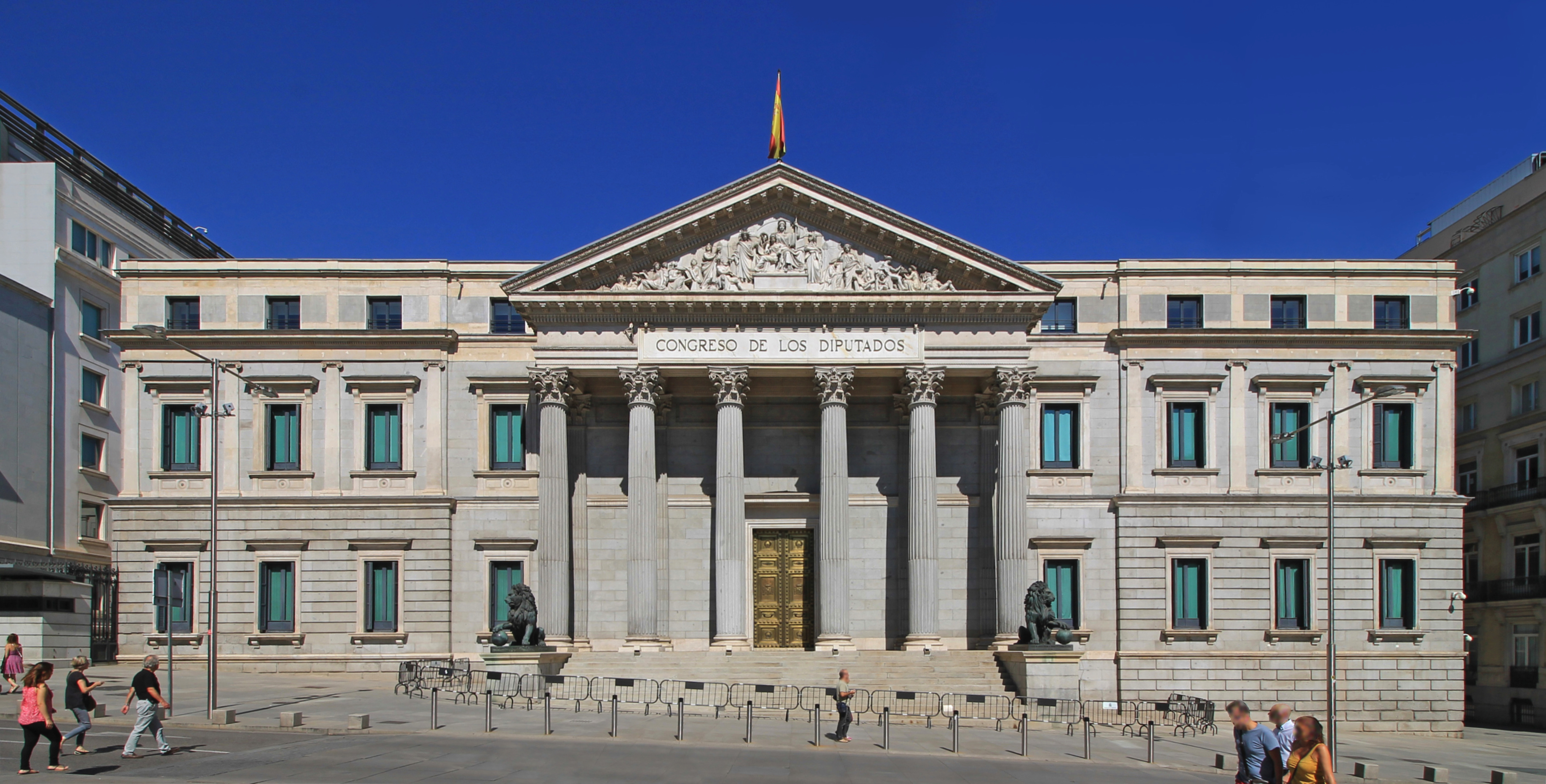
- Congress of Deputies; Palacio de las Cortes; Carrera de San Jerónimo; Centro, Madrid

Website
- cortesgenerales.es

The Cortes Generales (Spanish pronunciation: [ˈkoɾtes xeneˈɾales], lit. 'General Courts'), or the Spanish Parliament, is the bicameral legislature of Spain, consisting of the Congress of Deputies (the lower house) and the Senate (the upper house).

The Congress of Deputies meets in the Palacio de las Cortes. The Senate meets in the Palacio del Senado. Both are in Madrid. The Cortes are elected through universal, free, equal, direct and secret suffrage, with the exception of some senatorial seats, which are elected indirectly by the legislatures of the autonomous communities. The Cortes Generales are composed of 616 members: 350 deputies and 266 senators.

The members of the Cortes Generales serve four-year terms, and they are representatives of the Spanish people. In both chambers, the seats are divided by constituencies that correspond with the fifty Spanish provinces, plus Ceuta and Melilla. However, each island or group of islands within the Canary and Balearic archipelagos forms a different constituency in the Senate.

As a parliamentary system, the Cortes confirm and dismiss the prime minister and their government; specifically, the candidate for Prime Minister has to be invested by the Congress with a majority of affirmative votes. The Congress can also dismiss the prime minister through a vote of no confidence. The Cortes also hold the power to enact a constitutional reform.

The modern Cortes Generales were created by the 1978 Constitution of Spain, but the institution has a long history.

== History ==
=== Visigothic Kingdom ===
The tribal councils organized under Germanic law in the Visigothic Kingdom had the power of appointing and confirming kings, as well as passing laws and judgment. The Visigothic Code compiled under kings Chindasuinth and Recceswinth in the mid-7th century placed the kings, Visigoths, and native Spanish under a single law and formed the basis of Spanish law through the medieval period. The Visigothic councils, however, gradually came to be completely dominated by the clergy under the leadership of the archbishop of Toledo; with ecclesiastical prerogatives completely secure, they then tended to allow royal edicts to come into effect without further ratification.

=== High Middle Ages (8th–12th centuries) ===
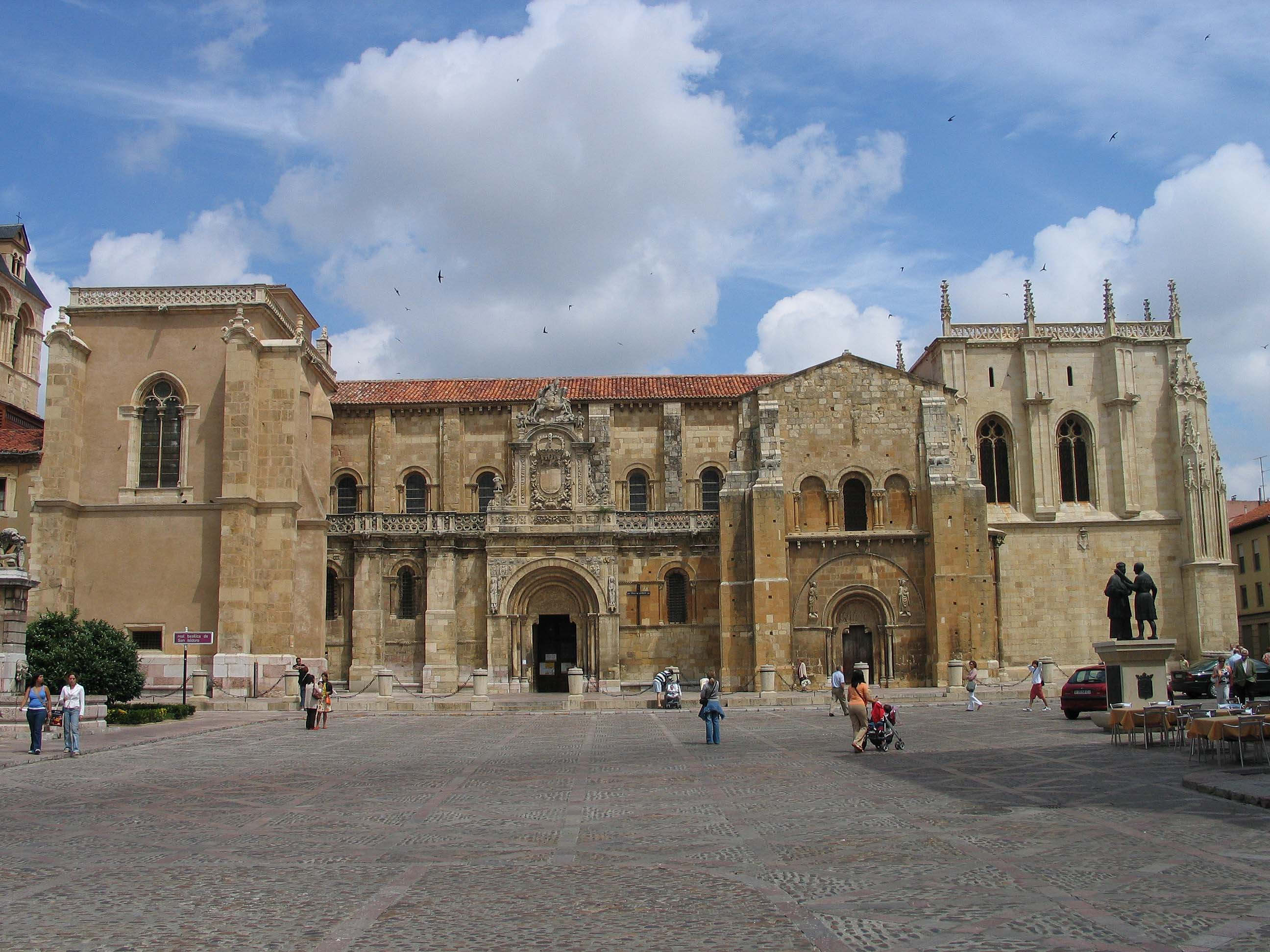
Saint Isidoro Basilica, where the 1188 Cortes of León was held

The royal councils (Latin: curia regis) of the Iberian Peninsula's various kingdoms came to be known as cortes (Spanish) or corts (Catalan/Valencian). They began as advisory councils made up of the most powerful nobles and the feudal lords closest to the king. General councils were convened in 873, 1020, 1050, and 1063. The 1188 Cortes of León convened by Alfonso IX is sometimes taken to mark the beginning of parliamentary bodies in Western Europe because it was the first to provide formal national representation of the free urban citizens alongside the clergy and hereditary nobility. Subsequently, larger and more inclusive Cortes occurred in the Principality of Catalonia in 1192, the Kingdom of Portugal in 1211, the Kingdom of Castile in 1250, the Kingdom of Aragon in 1274, the Kingdom of Valencia in 1283, and Kingdom of Navarre in 1300. The Leonese and Castilian Corteses were merged in 1258, after which it provided representation to Burgos, Toledo, León, Seville, Córdoba, Murcia, Jaén, Zamora, Segovia, Ávila, Salamanca, Cuenca, Toro, Valladolid, Soria, Madrid, Guadalajara, and (after 1492) Granada. On the other hand, the Cortes of the states of the Crown of Aragon remained separate bodies. In 1283, the Corts of Catalonia became the first parliamentary body in Europe with officially recognized co-legislative power, beyond the custom.

=== Rise of the bourgeoisie (12th–15th centuries) ===
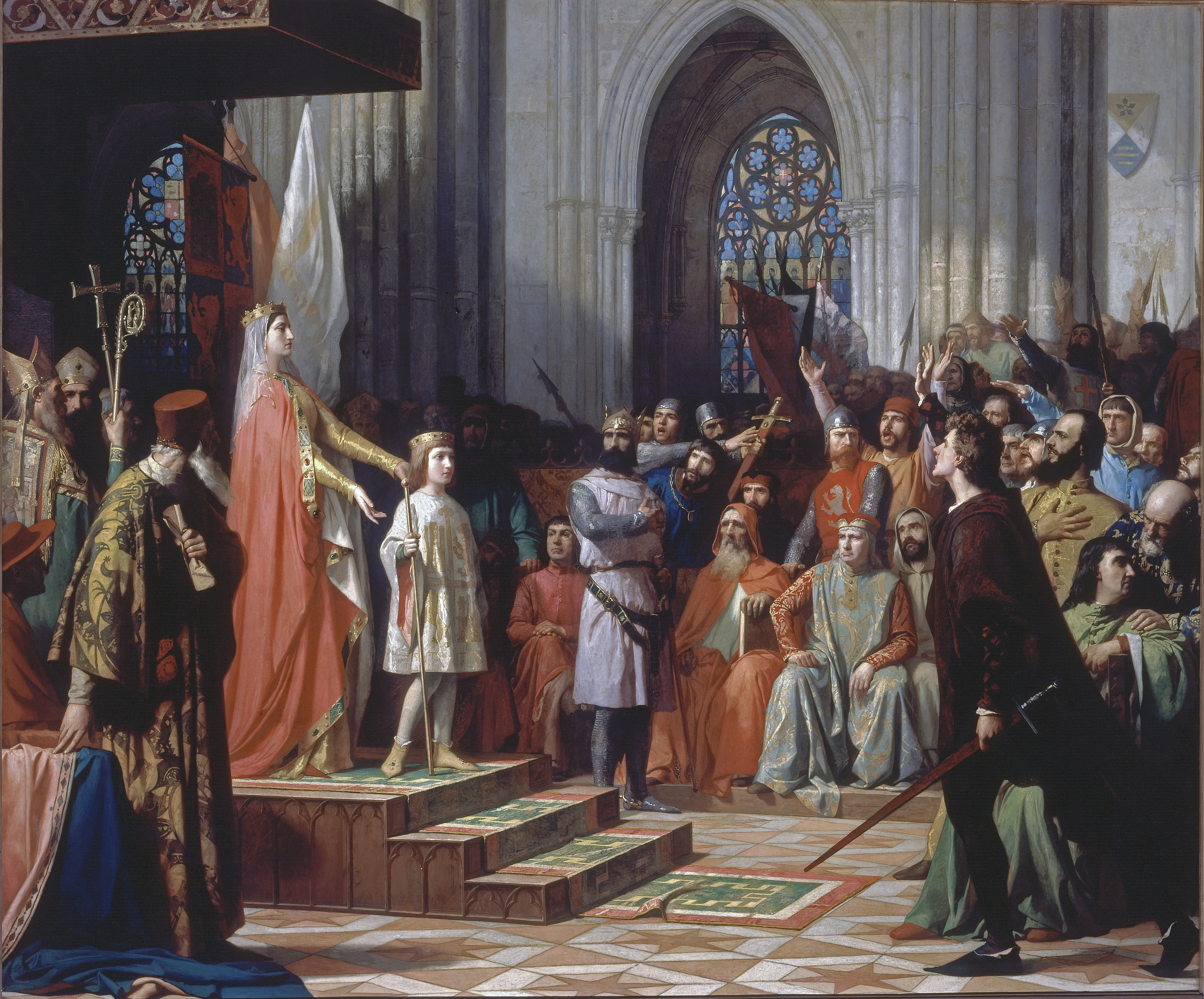
Queen Maria de Molina presents her son Ferdinand IV to the 1295 Cortes of Valladolid.

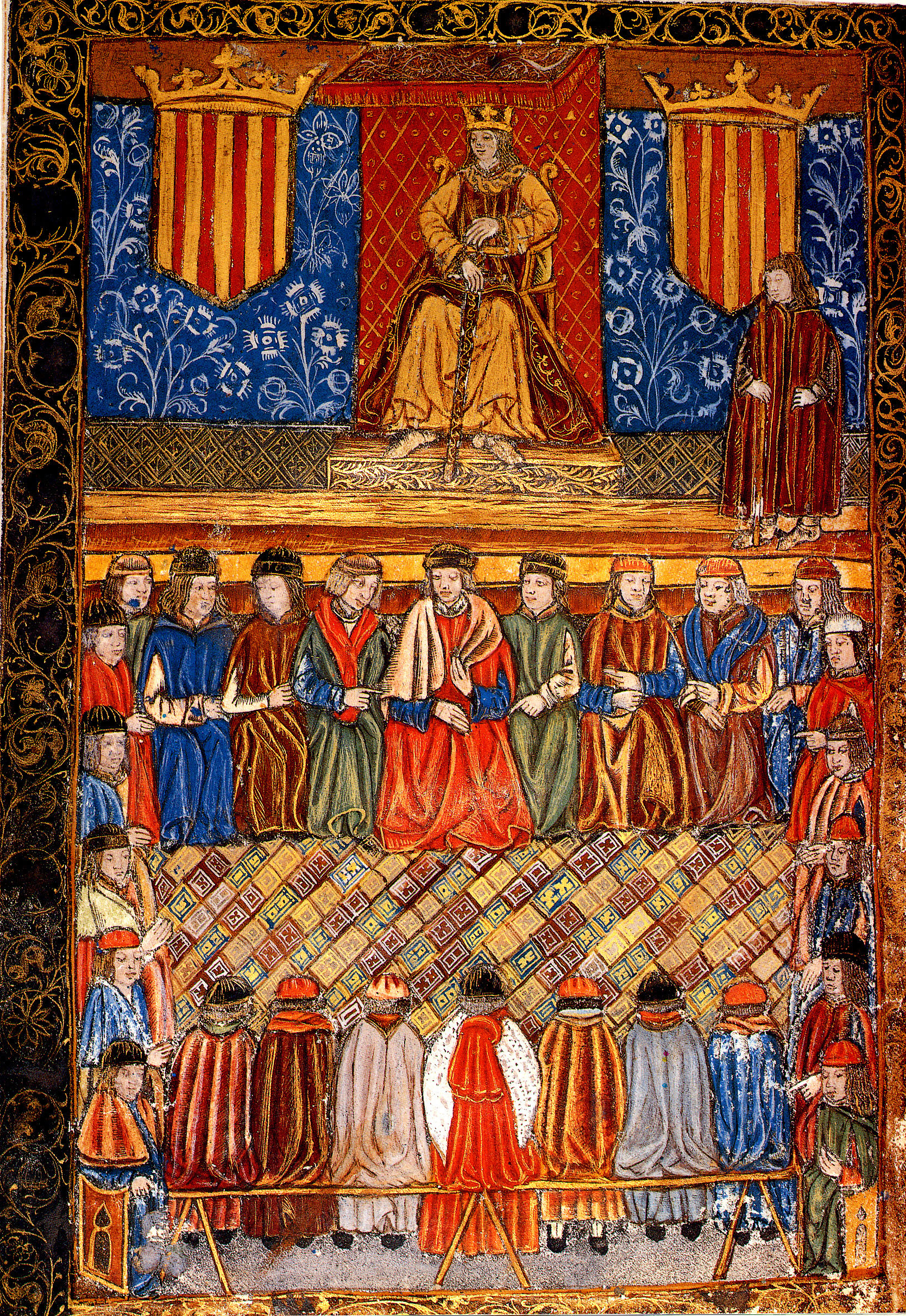
A meeting of the General Court of Catalonia in the 15th century. Frontispiece of a 1495 edition of the Constitutions of Catalonia

During the Reconquista, the growth of trade and an urbanized middle class (Spanish: burguesía) expanded their importance at the various corteses. The king retained the ability to call and dismiss the Cortes but tended to exchange fueros, further grants of privileges and autonomy, to the residents of certain cities in exchange for lump sum payments to meet military and other obligations. (Modern Navarre preserves certain rights and privileges in its current statute of autonomy directly derived from these fueros.) In some cases, the Cortes was able to independently select agents to act as permanent advisors to the king between its sessions.

=== Habsburg rule (16th–17th centuries) ===
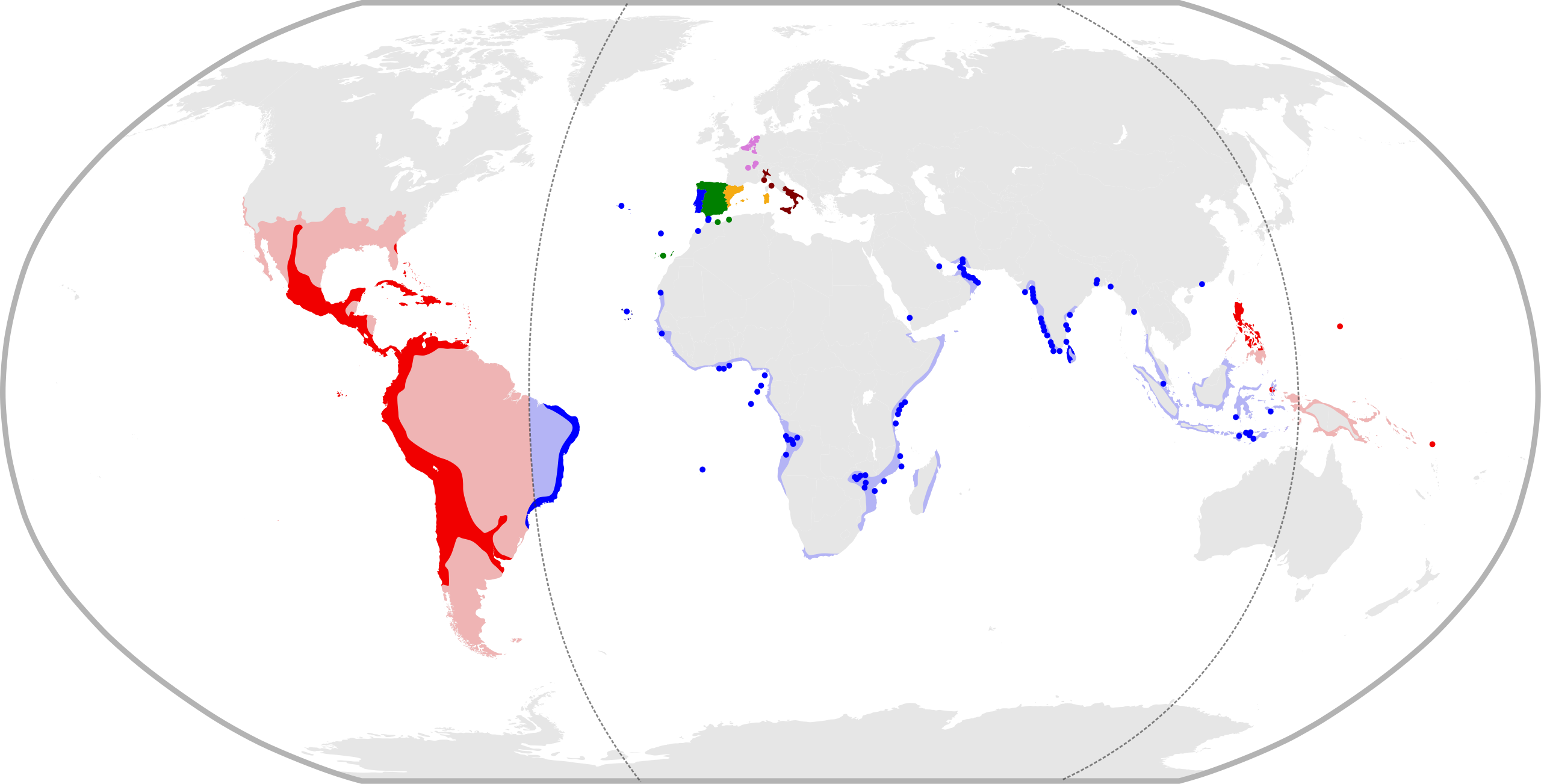
Map of the Iberian Union under Philip II in 1598, with the purviews of the empire's various corteses. Territory under the Council of Castile Territory under the Council of Aragon Territory under the Council of Portugal Territory under the Council of Italy Territory under the Council of the Indies Territory under the Council of Flanders

Beginning with the Catholic Monarchs Isabella and Ferdinand, monarchs' control over Spain's various kingdoms in personal union allowed them to curtail the power of the grandees and burghers. Queen Isabella initially had difficulty in securing funding for the voyages of Christopher Columbus in the 1490s but her grandson the Habsburg emperor Charles V (Charles I of Spain) was able to easily provide for Ferdinand Magellan's 1519 expedition and then to pointedly sell away all of Spain's rights to the Spice Islands without any consultation with the Toledo Cortes in 1529. The 1520 Revolt of the Comuneros had intended to reverse this trend and provide a stronger role for the Cortes but was crushed by the Constable's royalist forces at the 1521 Battle of Villalar and then brutally suppressed.

Reorganized, the corteses retained some power over the realm's finances—particularly in Aragon—but became limited to a consultative entity. By the reign of Philip II, the delegates of the Cortes of Castile were financially dependent on the Crown for their income. The Imperial Cortes and its deputation (Spanish: Diputación General de Cortes) primarily concerned themselves with overseeing previous agreements and the collection of taxes in Castile and the larger empire; separate deputations oversaw similar work in Aragon, Catalonia, Valencia and Navarre.

The corteses were able to regain some of their previous powers and influence during the 17th century, as repeated sovereign defaults reduced the monarchy to financial dependency and a series of deputies including the Count-Duke of Olivares oversaw most day-to-day government. Under the young and chronically ill Charles II, the Cortes of Castile was responsible for naming his mother Mariana regent.

=== Bourbon rule (18th–19th centuries) ===
During the War of the Spanish Succession, the Bourbon king Philip V suppressed the Cortes of Aragon and Valencia in 1707 and those of Catalonia and Mallorca in 1714. Following the Peace of Utrecht, the 1707-1716 Nueva Planta decrees fully abolished the autonomy of the Crown of Aragon. Philip also acted to repeal or curtail most of the diverse grants of autonomy and privilege (fueros) throughout his kingdom. Navarre was finally merged during the 1833 territorial division of Spain.

=== Napoleonic Spain and the Three Liberal Years ===
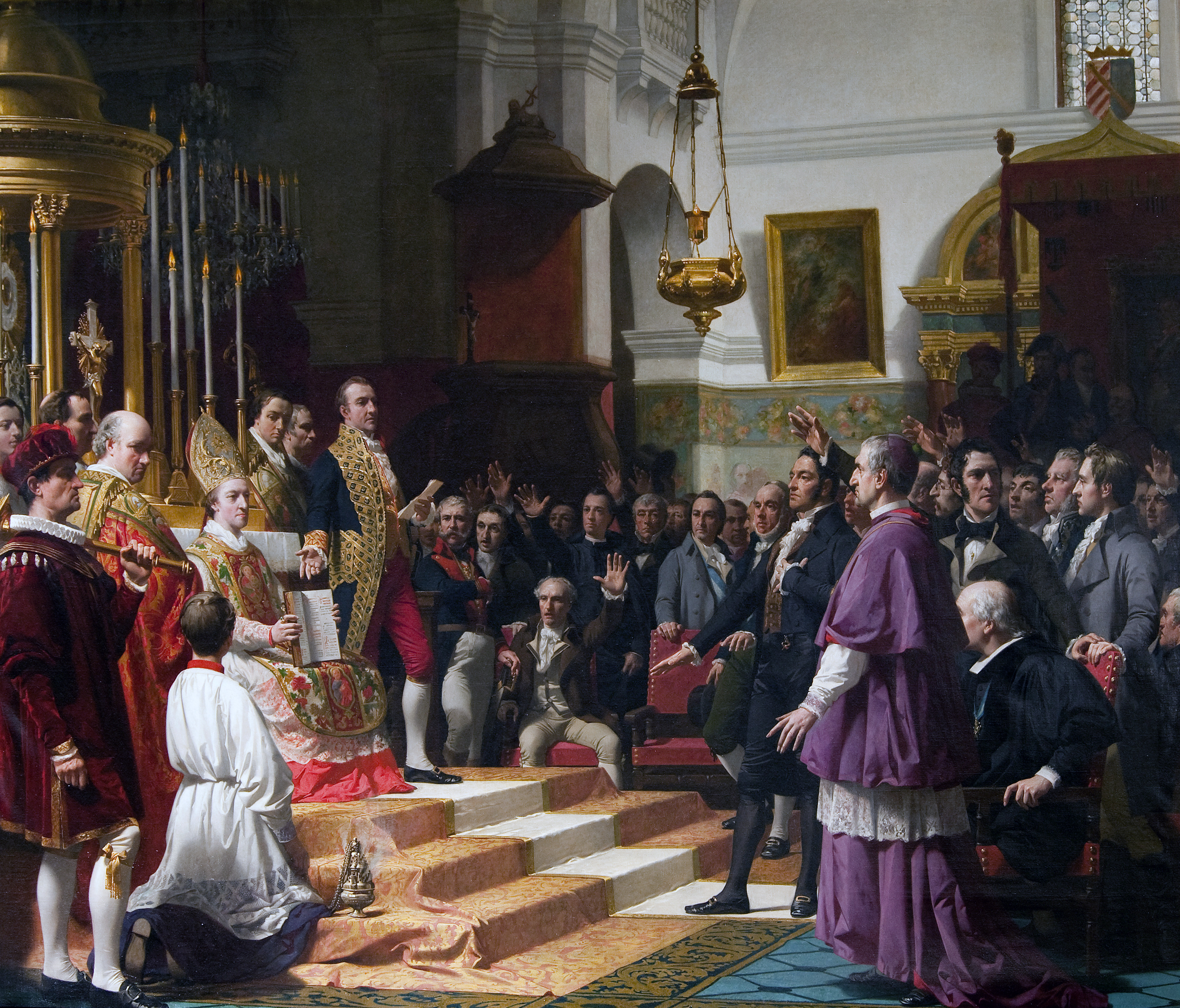
Jurement of the Cortes of Cádiz

With both the Bourbon monarchs Charles IV and Ferdinand VII having abdicated their throne and Napoleon Bonaparte having appointed his brother Joseph as the new king, a "Cortes of Cádiz" was convened that claimed sovereignty over Spain and operated as a government-in-exile. The Cortes was the first to act as a single representative body for the entire country and empire, although substitutes had to be chosen from among the people of Cádiz for many regions occupied by the French and unable to send their own delegates. Extremely liberal, the Constitution of 1812 enacted by the Cortes was immediately set aside by Ferdinand upon his restoration in 1814. His conservative policies led to a series of military coups that culminated in Col. Rafael del Riego forcing him to accept a more liberal constitution from 1820–1823, the Trienio Liberal ("Three Liberal Years"). Ferdinand vetoed nearly every law passed during the period and repeatedly asked other nations to invade and restore him to his previous authority. Finally, a French invasion crushed the National Militia and restored absolutist rule in Spain. During the subsequent reaction, many liberals were forced into exile, many—ironically—ending up in France, but generally Ferdinand VII was less strident in his policies through the remainder of his reign.

=== First Spanish Republic (1873–1874) ===
When the monarchy was overthrown in 1873, the king was forced into exile. The Senate was abolished because of its royally appointed nature. A republic was proclaimed and the Congress of Deputies members started writing a Constitution, supposedly that of a federal republic, with the power of Parliament being nearly supreme (see parliamentary supremacy, although Spain did not use the Westminster system). However, due to numerous issues, Spain was not ready to become a republic; after several crises the government collapsed, and the monarchy was restored in 1874.

=== Restoration (1874–1930) ===
The regime just after the First Republic is called the Bourbon Restoration. It was formally a constitutional monarchy, with the monarch as a rubberstamp to the Cortes' acts but with some reserve powers, such as appointing and dismissing the Prime Minister and appointing senators for the new Senate, remade as an elected House. In practice there was an artificial two-party system called El Turno Pacífico (peaceful rotation) in which elections were informally fixed so the Conservatives and Liberals would have alternating periods as the majority in the Cortes, with other parties restricted to a smaller number of seats.

Soon after the Soviet revolution (1917), the Spanish political parties started polarizing, and the left-wing Communist Party (PCE) and Spanish Socialist Workers' Party (PSOE) blamed the Government for supposed election fraud in small towns (caciquismo), which was incorrectly supposed to have been wiped out in the 1900s by the failed regenerationist movement. In the meantime, spiralling violence started with the murders of many leaders by both sides. Deprived of those leaders, the regime entered a general crisis, with extreme police measures which led to a dictatorship (1921–1930) during which the Senate was again abolished.

=== Second Spanish Republic (1931–1939) ===
The dictatorship, now ruled by Admiral Aznar-Cabañas, called for local elections. The results were overwhelmingly favorable to the monarchist cause nationally, but most provincial capitals and other sizable cities sided heavily with the republicans. This was interpreted as a victory, as the rural results were under the always-present suspicion of caciquismo and other irregularities while the urban results were harder to influence. The King left Spain, and a Republic was declared on 14 April 1931.

The Second Spanish Republic was established as a presidential republic, with a unicameral Parliament and a President of the Republic as the Head of State. Among his powers were the appointment and dismissal of the Prime Minister, either on the advice of Parliament or just having consulted it before, and a limited power to dissolve the Parliament and call for new elections.

The first term was the constituent term charged with creating the new Constitution, with the ex-monarchist leader Niceto Alcalá Zamora as President of the Republic and the left-wing leader Manuel Azaña as Prime Minister. The election gave a majority in the Cortes and thus, the Government, to a coalition between Azaña's party and the PSOE. A remarkable achievement at this time was universal suffrage, allowing women to vote, a provision highly criticized by Socialist leader Indalecio Prieto, who said the Republic had been backstabbed. Also, for the second time in Spanish history, some regions were granted autonomous governments within the unitary state. Many on the extreme right rose up with General José Sanjurjo in 1932 against the Government's social policies, but the coup was quickly defeated.

The elections for the second term were held in 1933 and won by the coalition between the Radical Party (center) and the Confederación Española de Derechas Autónomas (CEDA) (right). Initially, only the Radical Party entered the Government, with the parliamentary support of the CEDA. However, in the middle of the term, several corruption scandals (among them the Straperlo and the Nombela affairs) sank the Radical Party and the CEDA entered the Government in 1934. This led to uprisings by some leftist parties that were quickly suffocated. In one of them, the left wing government of Catalonia, which had been granted home rule, formally rebelled against the central government, denying its power. This provoked the dissolution of the Generalitat de Catalunya and the imprisonment of their leaders. The leftist minority in the Cortes then pressed Alcalá Zamora for a dissolution, arguing that the uprisings were the consequence of social rejection of the right-wing government. The President, a former monarchist Minister wary of the authoritarianism of the right, dissolved Parliament.

The next election was held in 1936. It was hotly contested, with all parties converging into three coalitions: the leftist Popular Front, the right-wing National Front and a Centre coalition. In the end, the Popular Front won with a small edge in votes over the runner-up National Front, but achieved a solid majority due to the new electoral system introduced by the CEDA government hoping that they would get the edge in votes. The new Parliament then dismissed Alcalá-Zamora and installed Manuel Azaña in his place. During the third term, the extreme polarisation of the Spanish society was more evident than ever in Parliament, with confrontation reaching the level of death threats. The already bad political and social climate created by the long-term left-right confrontation worsened, and many right-wing rebellions were started. Then, in 1936, the Army's failed coup degenerated into the Spanish Civil War, putting an end to the Second Republic.

From November 1936 to October 1937, the Cortes were held at Valencia City Hall, which was still being used for its local purposes at the same time. The building was a target for the Italian Air Force in service of the Nationalist faction, resulting in a bombing in May 1937.

=== Francoist Spain (1943–1977) ===
Francisco Franco did not prioritize the creation of a consultative or legislative type of assembly during his rule. In 1942, following the first symptoms of change in the international panorama in favour of the Allied Powers, a law established the Cortes Españolas (Spanish Cortes), a non-democratic chamber made up of more than 400 procuradores (singular procurador). Both the Cortes' founding law and the subsequent regulations were based on the principles of rejection of parliamentarism and political pluralism. Members of the Cortes were not elected and exercised only symbolic power. It had no power over government spending, and the cabinet, appointed and dismissed by Franco alone, retained real legislative authority. In 1967, with the enaction of the Organic Law of the State, the accommodation of "two family representatives per province, elected by those on the electoral roll of family heads and married women" (the so-called tercio familiar) ensued, opening a fraction of the Cortes' composition to some mechanisms of individual participation.

== Under the Constitution of 1978 ==
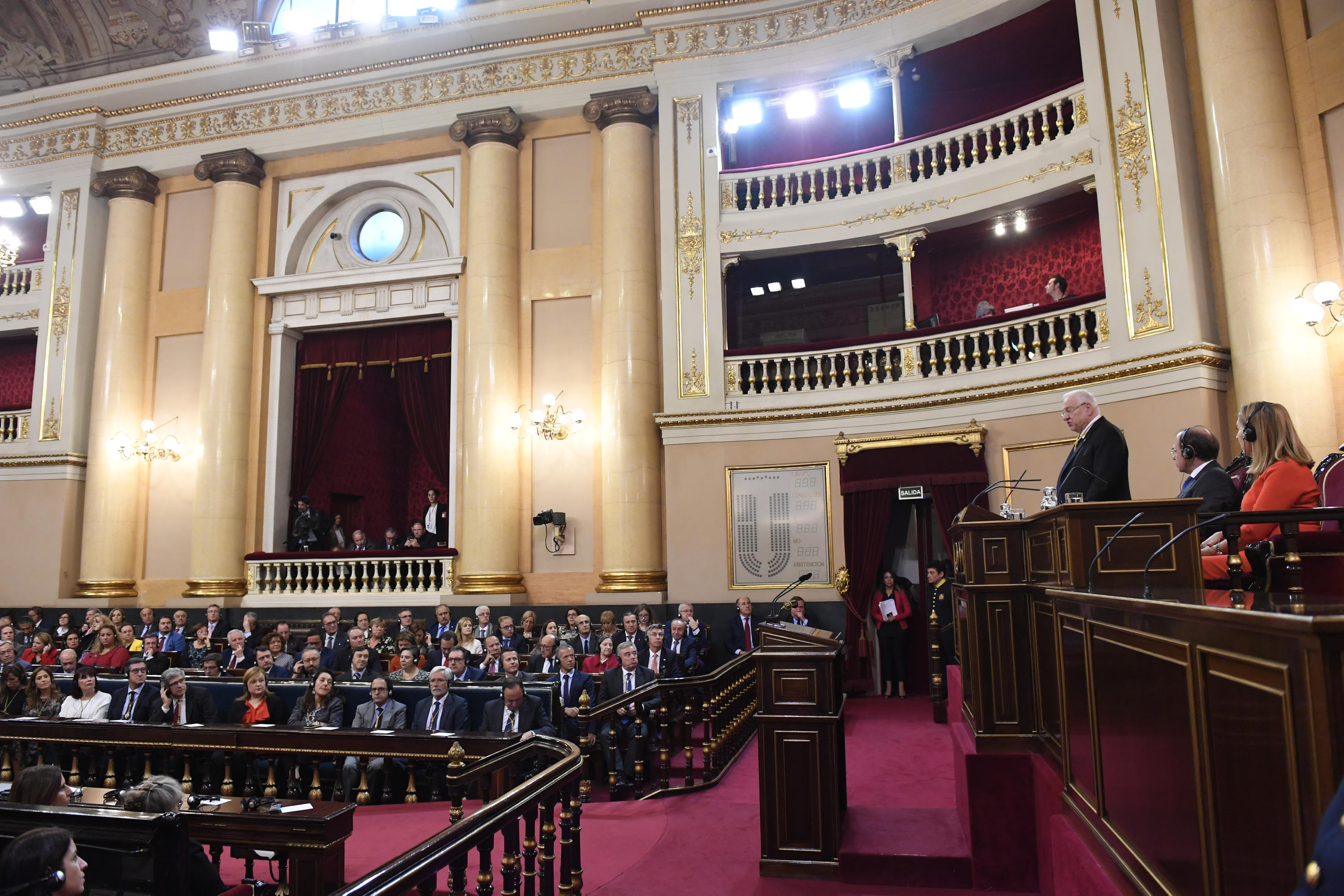
The President of Israel Reuven Rivlin addresses the Cortes Generales during his state visit to Madrid in November 2017

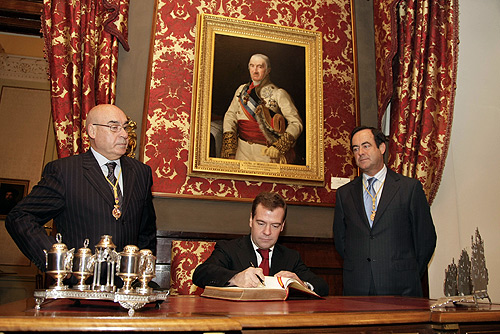
Russian President Dmitry Medvedev signs the Book of Distinguished Guests at the Cortes Generales in Madrid on 3 March 2009

The Cortes are a bicameral parliament composed of a lower house (Congreso de los Diputados, congress of deputies) and an upper house (Senado, senate). Although they share legislative power, the Congress holds the power to ultimately override any decision of the Senate by a sufficient majority (usually an absolute majority or three-fifths majority).

The Congress is composed of 350 deputies (but that figure may change in the future as the constitution establishes a maximum of 400 and a minimum of 300) directly elected by universal suffrage approximately every four years.

The Senate is partly directly elected in that four senators per province are elected as a general rule and partly appointed by the legislative assemblies of the autonomous communities, one for each community and another one for every million inhabitants in their territory. Although the Senate was conceived as a territorial upper house, it has been argued by nationalist parties and the Spanish Socialist Workers' Party that it does not accomplish such a task because 208 out of 265 members of the Senate are elected by popular vote in each province, and only 58 are representatives appointed by the regional legislatures of autonomous communities.

Proposals to reform the Senate have been discussed, with one of the main themes of reform is to move towards a higher level of federalization and make the Senate a thorough representation of autonomous communities instead of the current system, which tries to incorporate the interests of province and autonomous communities at the same time.

== Joint Committees ==
Committee	Office	Chair(s)	Term	Refs
Relations with the Court of Auditors	deputy	Juan Francisco Serrano Martínez (PSOE)	2023–present	
European Union	deputy	Alberto Fabra (PP)	2025–present	
Relations with the Ombudsman	deputy	Luis María Beamonte (PP)	2023–present	
Parliamentary Control of RTVE's Board and its Partnerships	senator	Antonio Silván (PP)	2023–present	
National Security	deputy	Edurne Uriarte (PP)	2024–present	
Study of Addictions' Issues	deputy	Pablo Hispán (PP)	2023–present	
Coordination and Monitoring of the Spanish Strategy to accomplish the Sustainable Development Goals (SDGs)	deputy	Engracia Rivera (Sumar)	2023–present	
Insularity	senator	José Antonio Valbuena Alonso (PSOE)	2023–present	

== See also ==
- List of presidents of the Congress of Deputies of Spain
- Solemn Opening of the Parliament of Spain
- Bureaus of the Cortes Generales
- Spanish Parliamentarism
