= Pedro Antonio Acuña y Cuadros =

Spanish politician

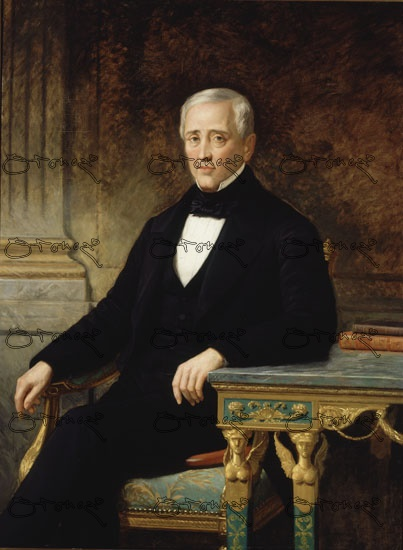
Official portrait of Pedro Antonio Acuña y Cuadros as president of the Congress of Deputies, by Ignacio Suárez Llanos. 1842.

Pedro Antonio Acuña y Cuadros (Baeza, 13 March 1786 - Andújar, 9 January 1850) was a Spanish politician. He served as president of the Congress of Deputies in two occasions, in April 1837 and from December 27, 1841 to July 16, 1842, and as minister of Home Affairs under prime minister José María Calatrava y Peinado from June 9, 1837 to August 18, 1837, when the government resigned.

An hacendado and member of the National Militia, he was elected member of the Congress of Deputies for Jaén in October 1834, replacing Juan Manuel Subrie. He got 18 votes out of 18 possible votes of its constituency. He was re-elected in the July 1836 general election and, after the revolt of the sergeants of the Royal Palace of La Granja de San Ildefonso in October 1836, he joined the committee responsible for writing the new Constitution, being one of the signing MPs. In the 1837 and 1839 general elections he was senator for Jaén until March 1841 when he resigned to occupy a seat in the lower house. In December 1841, he was elected president of the Congress replacing Agustín Argüelles until July 1842. In 1843, he was re-elected one last time as senator for Jaén, being elected Second Vice President of the Senate.

Luis de Solís y Manso, 6th Marquess of Rianzuela, dedicated him a brief and commendable obituary in which he indicated that Acuña y Cuadros was a descendant of Bishop Antonio Osorio de Acuña and he said that he was owner of a considerable fortune in connections and lordships in Las Encartaciones, although, Acuña was a supporter of the ideas of progress even if they were contrary to his interests, defended the separation and confiscation to favor the division and increase of property.
