= Agustín Argüelles =

Spanish liberal politician (1776-1844)

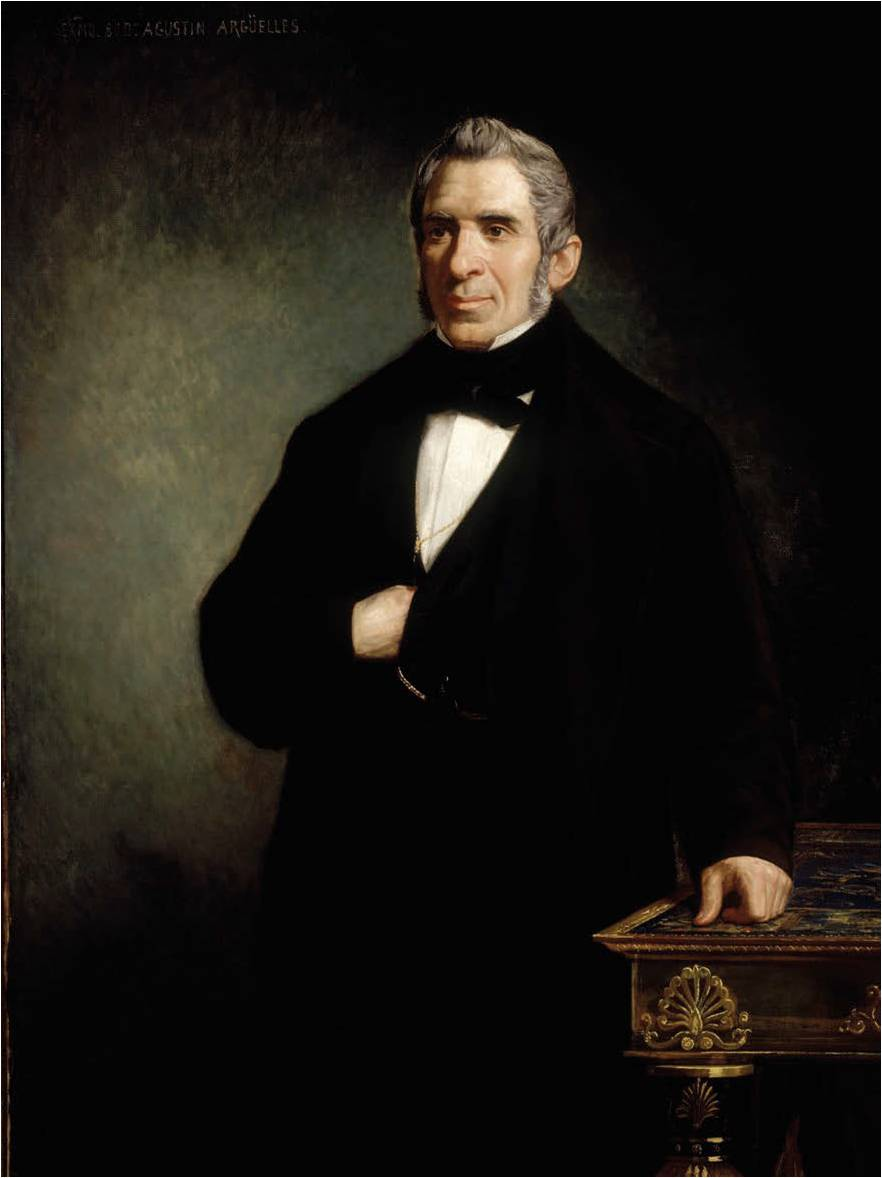

94th President of the Congress of Deputies
- In office 1841–1842

Minister of the Interior
- In office 1820–1821
- Monarch: Ferdinand VII

Member of the Cortes of Cádiz
- In office 1810–1813

Personal details
- Born: 18 August 1776 Ribadesella, Asturias, Spain
- Died: 26 March 1844 (aged 67) Madrid, Spain
- Party: Progressive Liberal
- Education: University of Oviedo
- Occupation: Lawyer, politician
- Known for: Drafting the Spanish Constitution of 1812 and 1837

Agustín Argüelles (18 August 1776 – 26 March 1844) was a Spanish liberal politician. He served as the 81st and 94th president of the Congress of Deputies.

== Biography ==
He studied Law at the University of Oviedo and worked as secretary of the bishop of Barcelona. In 1809, he was appointed secretary of the patriotic Royal Junta of the Treasury and Legislation. He was a member of the Cortes of Cádiz and was selected for the Constitutional commission, playing thus a key role in the drafting of the Constitution of 1812. Siding with the liberal faction of the Parliament, he promoted freedom of the press, free-market and physiocracy, the abolishment of torture, the prosecution of slave trade and the abolishment of the jurisdictional power of manors. He showed a notable oratorial skill during the parliamentary debates.

When in 1814 the War of Independence finished and Ferdinand VII returned to Spain as absolute monarch, Argüelles was imprisoned in Ceuta and later in Alcudia (Mallorca). After the Riego's coup d'état in 1820, he was appointed minister of the Interior and led the moderate wing of the liberal party. He resigned in 1821 and was elected member of the Parliament in 1822. After the absolutist reaction of 1823, he exiled to Britain and turned back in 1834, when Queen Regent Maria Christina signed the 'Estatuto Real'. He was elected member of the Parliament and also turned to his original progressive liberal positions back, giving support to Mendizábal cabinet of 1835 and his ecclesiastical confiscation policy. After the revolution of 1836, he was appointed member of the commission for composing the Constitution that was promulgated in 1837. Thanks to him and to Olózaga, the Constitution was progressive liberal but not so much as 1812's, as they hoped moderate liberals would accept it.

When Queen Regent Maria Christina resigned in 1840, the Parliament debated whether to appoint one or three regents, including Argüelles. Finally, General Espartero was elected as the only Regent, but Argüelles was appointed legal guardian of Queen Isabella II (although Maria Christina protested the decision from Paris) and president of the Parliament. He ceased to be legal tutor in 1843, when Espartero resigned as Regent and Parliament decided to declare come of age 13-year-old queen.

== Legacy ==
The Argüelles neighborhood of Madrid is named after him, as is the Argüelles metro stop.

== Writings ==
- with Olózaga, José: De 1820 a 1824: reseña histórica, Madrid: A. de San Martín, 1864
- Discurso preliminar de la Constitución de 1812, Madrid: Centro de Estudios Constitucionales, 1989
- Examen histórico de la reforma constitucional de España, Oviedo: Junta General del Principado de Asturias, 1999
- La reforma constitucional de Cádiz (annoted by Jesús Longares), Madrid: Iter, 1970

== Bibliography ==
- Ramos Argüelles, Antonio: Agustín Argüelles (1776-1844), "Padre del constitucionalismo español", Madrid: Atlas, 1991
