= Antonio de los Ríos Rosas =

Spanish politician

The Most Excellent Antonio de los Ríos
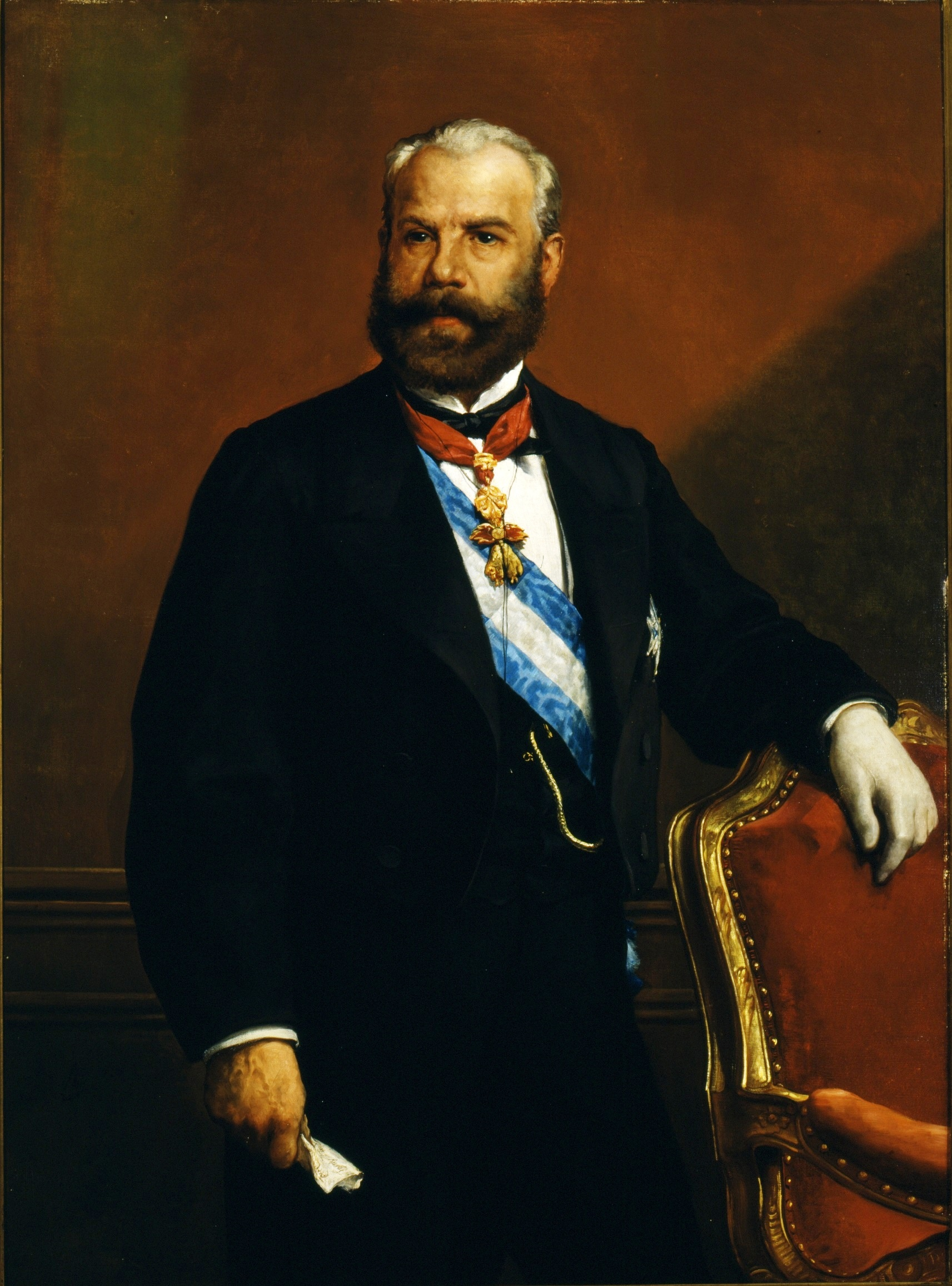
- Portrait as president of Congress.
- Born: Antonio de los Ríos Rosas; 16 March 1812; Ronda, Spain
- Died: 3 November 1873 (aged 61); Madrid, Spain

Seat T of the Real Academia Española
- In office 12 February 1871 – 3 November 1873
- Preceded by: José Joaquín de Mora
- Succeeded by: Gaspar Núñez de Arce

Antonio de los Ríos Rosas (16 March 1812, in Ronda, Spain; 3 November 1873, in Madrid, Spain) was a Spanish politician.

A graduate of the University of Granada, he was elected three times President of the Congress of Deputies, the first time in 1863.

== Honours ==
Towards the end of his life he was elected a member of the Royal Spanish Academy.
