= José Miguel Guridi y Alcocer =

Spanish-Mexican politician

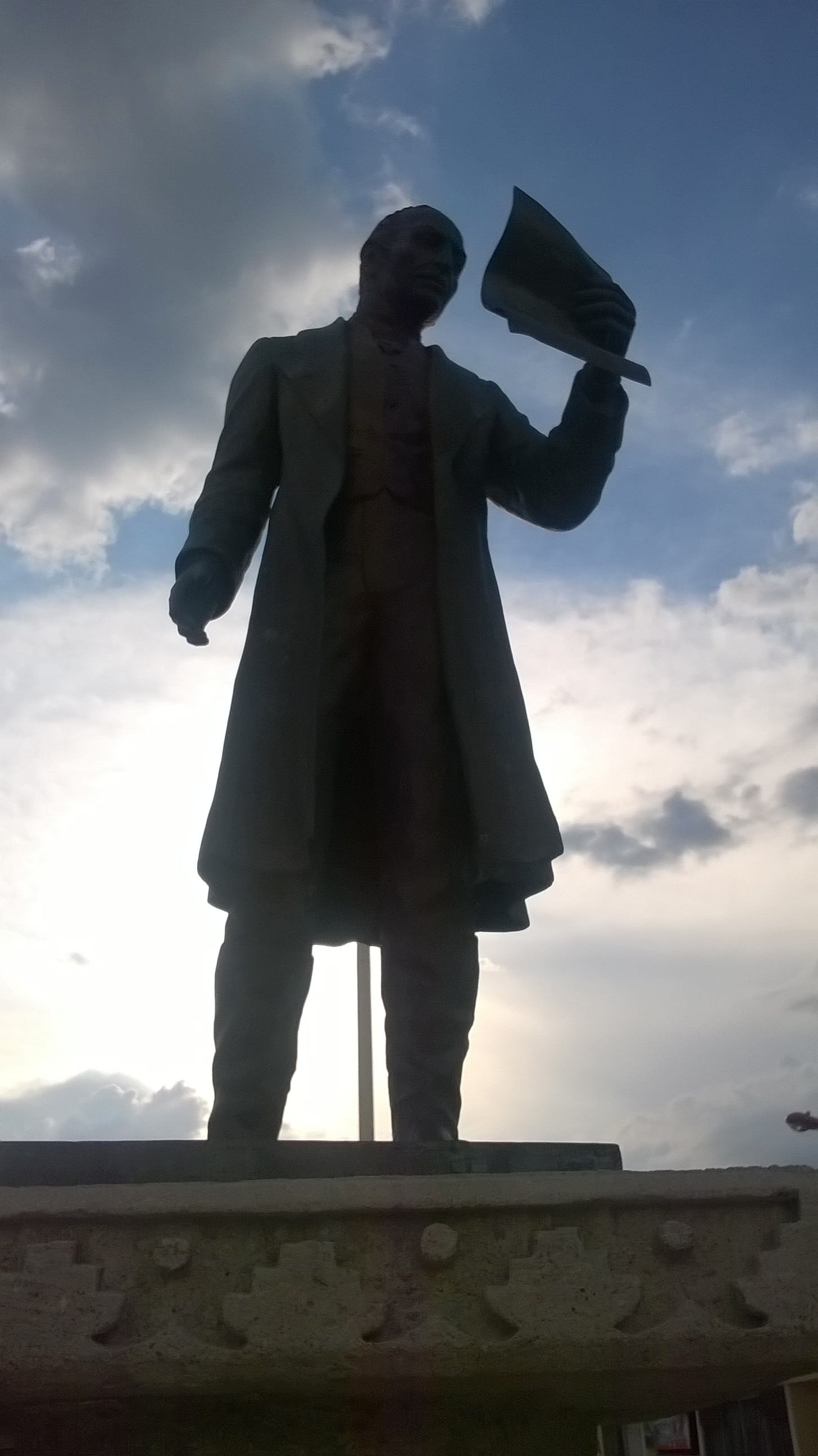

José Miguel Guridi y Alcocer (December 23, 1763 – October 4, 1828) was a Spanish-Mexican politician. He was the President of the Spanish Cadíz Cortes.
