= Modesto Lafuente =

Spanish critic and historian

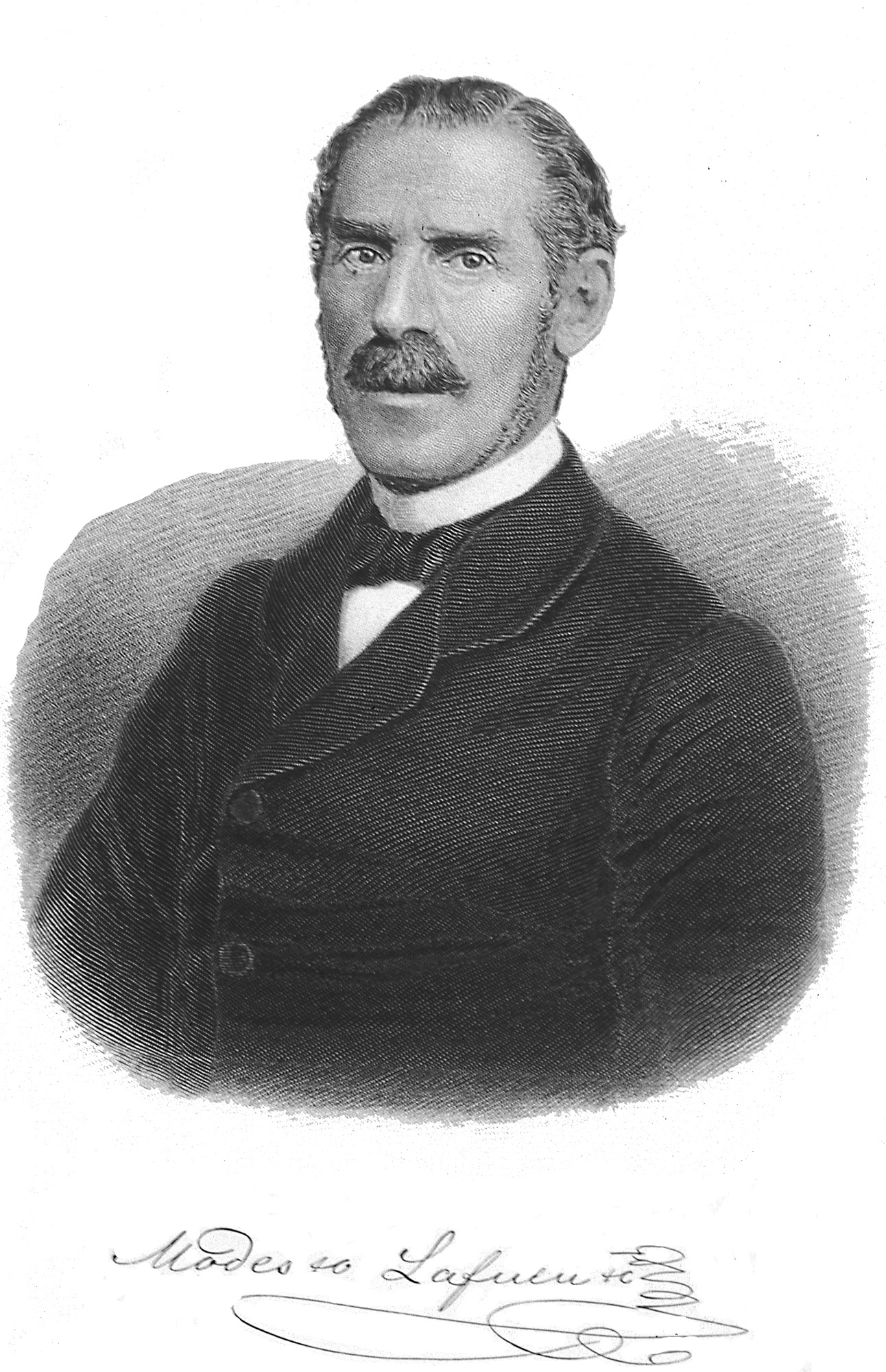
Modesto Lafuente y Zamalloa

Modesto Lafuente y Zamalloa (1 May 1806 at Rabanal de los Caballeros, Cervera de Pisuerga, Palencia Province – 25 October 1866 at Madrid) was a Spanish critic and historian. In 1861 he was elected Vice President of the Congress of Deputies and, in February 7, 1862, he assumed the office of acting president of the Congress due to the death in office of Francisco Martínez de la Rosa until February 18, 1862.

== Biography ==
He received his early education in his native town, but later took courses at the Universities of Santiago, Astorga and Valladolid, receiving at the last institution the degree of Bachelor of Theology in 1832.

He was appointed to the chair of philosophy and later to that of theology at the University of Astorga, but he remained only a short time, for he decided to devote himself to journalism, and moved to Madrid.

== Writings ==
Under the pseudonyms of Fray Gerundio and Pelegrin Tirabeque, he wrote many capilladas or essays on a great variety of subjects, including the political questions of the day. According to Ferrer del Rio, he borrowed the pseudonym Fray Gerundio from the work of Father Isla. His essays, and all his works, were written in an easy, flowing, popular style, and they became so popular that it was not long before his paper was read in every corner of Spain. The essays were collected as Capilladas (1837–40) and as Teatro social del siglo XIX (1846), the latter dealing with the manners and customs of the day.

Lafuente's chief work, by which he is best known, is his Historia general de España, which he published in Madrid (1850–1869, 30 volumes). A second edition (13 volumes) was published in 1874–1875. It was later edited and revised by Juan Valera (25 vols., 1887–90).

Another notable work is Viaje aerostático del Fray Gerundio y Tirabeque. It is divided into two parts, the first being a review of aerial navigation, and the second, a satire on the political situation in Europe.

The important events of 1848 caused him to write his Revista Europea which he published as a periodical for about one year.

== Sources ==
- Rines, George Edwin, ed. (1920). "Lafuente y Zamalloa, Modesto" . Encyclopedia Americana.
