= Ramón Lázaro de Dou y de Bassols =

Spanish professor and priest

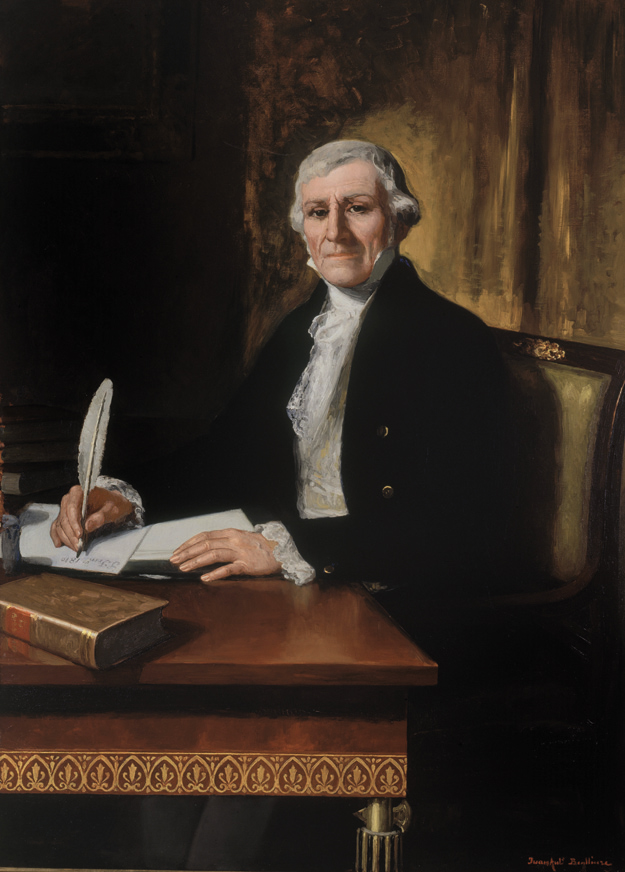

1st President of the Congress of Deputies
- In office 24 September 1810 – 23 October 1810
- Preceded by: Office established
- Succeeded by: Luis Rodríguez del Monte

Member of the Congress of Deputies
- In office 19 September 1810 – 20 September 1813
- In office 13 September 1813 – 15 January 1814

Personal details
- Born: Ramón Lázaro de Dou y de Bassols; February 11, 1742 Barcelona, Spain
- Died: December 14, 1832 (aged 90) Cervera, Spain
- Education: University of Barcelona
- Profession: Chancellor and professor of the University of Cervera

Ramón Lázaro de Dou y de Bassols (February 11, 1742 – December 14, 1832) was a Spanish professor and priest who was the first President of the Congress of Deputies after being elected by the majority of the Cortes of Cádiz. Lázaro was member of the Cortes representing the Principality of Catalonia from September 19, 1810, to January 15, 1814. He was noted for his pioneering work in the systematization of administrative law.

== Biography ==
Lázaro started its studies in the jesuits Imperial College of Our Lady and Santiago de Cordellas and he studied law in Cervera gaining in 1770 the professorship of Decretals by the Cervera University. He was ordained priest and published several works. Between 1771 and 1776 he practiced law in the office of his brother Ignacio, who was an advisor to the Consulate of the Sea of Barcelona in regard to general income and contraband.

His Institutiones del Derecho público general de España (1800–03) were the first systematic outline of the governmental institutions of the Spanish-speaking world. The work was also the first to make a distinction between the general principles governing administrative proceedings, and the special rules applicable to specific authorities or areas of law.

In 1805 he was appointed Chancellor of the University of Cervera, a position that he held until his death. After the invasion of the Hundred Thousand Sons of Saint Louis, Dou was investigated but was found innocent.

He was elected MP by the Province of Tarragona representing the Principality of Catalonia on February 23, 1810, and he assented to the first session of a Spanish parliament in its history on September 24, 1810. Ramon Lázaro de Dou was elected as the first President of the Congress of Deputies by 50 votes against the 45 votes that obtained Benito Ramón Hermida Maldonado, who during that session was the Acting President. He did not run for reelection but he was chosen as substitute MP until the arrival of the elected MPs from late 1813 and first 1814.

Reformist and with a moderately conservative thought, he voted for national sovereignty and he was one of the signants of the Constitution of 1812. He also participated in the debates on the abolition of torture, the freedom of the press, the organization of the provinces, the reform of the Treasury and the regulations of the Regency Council. He was enthusiastic supporter of the single direct taxation, already projected by the Marquess of Ensenada, with the suppression of provincial revenues and conservation of customs and some monopolies.

After the repeal of the 1812 Constitution by King Ferdinand VII, Lázaro focused to the government of the Cervera University, continuing with its economic studies. He was a person with a lot of fame at the time, such was his fame that when Pope Gregory XVI decided to abolish the position of Chancellor in Spanish universities, the Pope did not abolished the position in the University of Cervera, in which he was the chancellor.
