= Diego Clemencín =

Spanish politician

The Most Excellent Diego Clemencín
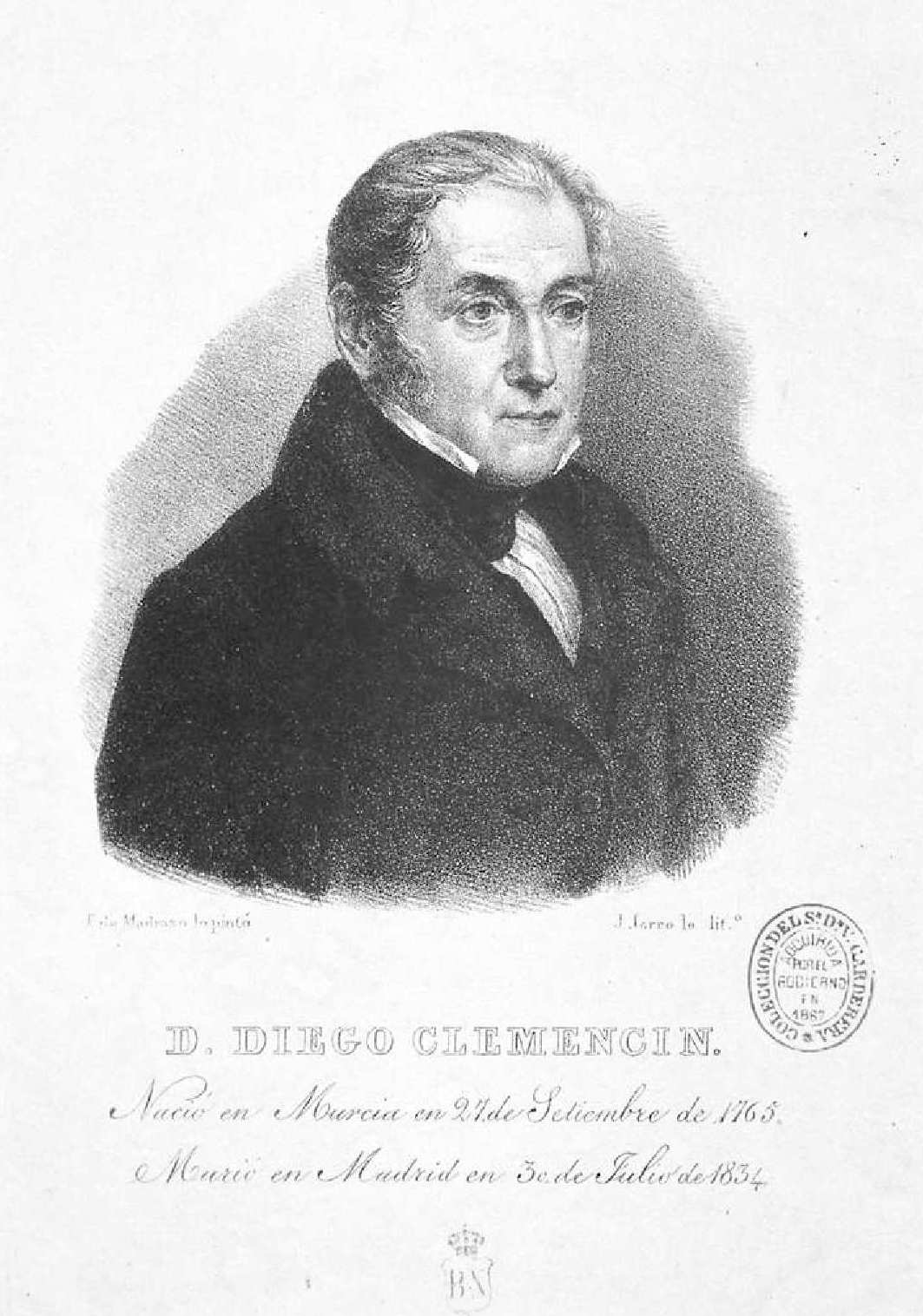
- Born: Diego Clemencín y Viñas; 27 September 1765; Murcia, Spain
- Died: 10 June 1834 (aged 68); Madrid, Spain

Seat I of the Real Academia Española
- In office 22 March 1814 – 10 June 1834
- Preceded by: Francisco Patricio de Berguizas
- Succeeded by: Jerónimo del Campo y Roselló

Diego Clemencín y Viñas (27 September 1765 – 10 June 1834) was a Spanish scholar and politician.

== Early life and education ==
Born in Murcia, he was educated at the Colegio de San Fulgencio. Abandoning his intention of taking Holy Orders, he found employment at Madrid in 1788 as tutor to the sons of the countess-duchess de Benavente, and devoted himself to the study of archaeology.

== Later life ==
In 1807 he became editor of the Gaceta de Madrid, and in the following year was condemned to death by Joachim Murat for publishing a patriotic article; he fled to Cádiz, and under the Junta Central held various posts from which he was dismissed by the reactionary government of 1814. During the liberal régime of 1820–1823 Clemencín took office as colonial minister, was exiled till 1827, and in 1833 published the first volume of his edition (1833–1839) of Don Quixote. Its merits were recognized by his appointment as royal librarian, but he did not long enjoy his triumph: he died on 30 July 1834.

His commentary on Don Quixote owes something to John Bowle, and was described in the 1911 edition of Encyclopædia Britannica as "disfigured by a patronizing, carping spirit"; nevertheless it is a valuable work of its kind for its time. Clemencín is also the author of an interesting Elogio de la reina Isabel la Católica, published as the sixth volume of the Memorias of the Spanish Academy of History, to which body he was elected on 12 September 1800.
