= 1810 Spanish general election =

- January - September 1810

All 276 seats of the Cortes of Cádiz 138 seats needed for a majority
- Turnout: NA

General elections to the special Cortes of Cádiz were held in Spain in 1810. At stake were all 276 seats in the Cortes of Cádiz – which served as a parliamentary Regency after Ferdinand VII was deposed by Napoleon.

== History ==
During the first years of the Spanish War of Independence (1808-1814) the popular revolts of the Spanish people were accompanied by the creation of provincial and local defense "Juntas". Those juntas assumed national sovereignty, forming their own local and regional governing bodies. These juntas aimed to defend against the French invasion and fill the power vacuum, refusing to recognize José I Bonaparte as their legitimate king. The juntas were mainly composed of military personnel, representatives of the high clergy, officials and professors. In September 1808 the local and provincial juntas ceded their power to the Supreme Central Government Junta of the Kingdom, which led the war against the French and was recognized as the legitimate government of Spain by the United Kingdom and other anti-Napoleonic countries. The Supreme Junta summoned an extraordinary meeting of the Cortes of Cádiz, a revolutionary act, since the right to call for a meeting of the Cortes was exclusive to the crown.

After an intense debate in the Supreme Junta it was decided that the Cortes of Cádiz would be unicameral, elected by census suffrage (only those with a certain level of income could vote) and indirect. The Cortes met for the first time in the last major Spanish foothold during the Peninsular War, Cádiz, on the Isla de León, on September 24, 1810.

== Constituencies ==
A majority voting system was used for the election, with 32 multi-member constituencies and 2 single-member constituencies. Spanish America had 29 representatives.

== Electorate ==
All male citizens above 25 years old could vote or be voted.
