= 1873 Spanish general election =

- 10–13 May 1873

All 424 seats in the Constituent Cortes (Note: Elections in Cuba were indefinitely postponed due to the outbreak of the Ten Years' War, resulting in the vacancy of the 18 seats allocated to the island.) 213 seats needed for a majority
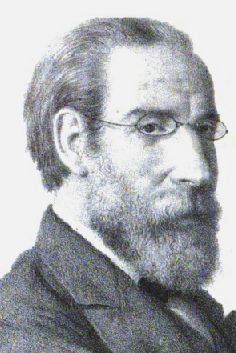

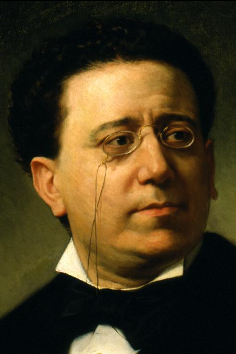

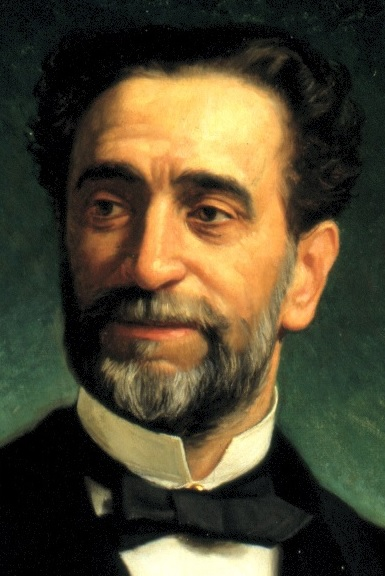
	First party	Second party	Third party
Leader	Francesc Pi i Margall	Cristino Martos	Práxedes Mateo Sagasta
Party	Republican	Radical	Conservative–Constitutional
Leader's seat	Barcelona	—	—
Seats won	343	20	7
Seat change	▲265	▼254	▼7
Prime Minister before election
Estanislao Figueras
Republican
Prime Minister after election
Estanislao Figueras
Republican

A general election was held in Spain from 10 to 13 May 1873 to elect the members of the Constituent Cortes in the First Spanish Republic. 406 of 424 seats in the Cortes were up for election. The election in Cuba was indefinitely postponed.

The election was held with universal male suffrage. It was held in very unorthodox conditions and drew a very low voter turnout, as neither the Carlist or Alfonsist monarchists participated. The same happened with centralist and unitarian Republicans, or even the incipient labor organizations affiliated with the First International, who held a campaign of election boycott. This left the republic with a serious lack of legitimacy. The Federal Democratic Republican Party won the election.

== Background ==
The political situation in Spain, worsened due to the outbreak of the Third Carlist War, the intensification of the Ten Years' War in Cuba, the breakup of the governing coalition—over frictions among its component factions, led by Prime Minister Manuel Ruiz Zorrilla and State minister Cristino Martos—and a conflict between the prime minister and the Artillery Corps, led King Amadeo I to finally abdicate the Spanish throne on 11 February 1873. As a consequence, the Spanish Cortes, reconstituted into a National Assembly in joint and permanent session, proclaimed the First Spanish Republic.

== Overview ==
Under the 1873 Republic proclamation, the Spanish Cortes conceived in the 1869 Constitution were reassembled as a National Assembly in a joint session of both the Congress of Deputies and the Senate. The electoral and procedural rules of the Democratic Sexennium remained in force with amendments, including the Senate's abolition and the Congress's conversion into a constituent assembly.

=== Date ===
Election day was held over several voting days: the first was used to elect polling station officials, and the remaining ones were devoted to the parliamentary election itself.

The election to the Constituent Cortes was officially called on 11 March 1873, with the corresponding decree setting election day for between 10 and 13 May. In Cuba, elections were indefinitely postponed due to the Ten Years' War.

=== Electoral system ===
Voting for the Cortes was based on universal manhood suffrage, comprising all Spanish national males over 21 years of age with full civil rights. In Puerto Rico, voting was based on censitary suffrage, comprising Spanish males of voting age who were either literate or taxpayers for any direct tax, barring freedmen without political rights. (Note: Slavery had been abolished in Puerto Rico on 22 March 1873.) Additional restrictions excluded those deprived of political rights or barred from public office by a final sentence, criminally imprisoned (without bail) or convicted, and homeless.

The Constituent Cortes had one seat per 40,000 inhabitants or fraction above 20,000. All were elected in single-member districts using plurality voting and distributed among the provinces of Spain according to population. Cuba and Puerto Rico were allocated 18 and 15 seats, respectively. As a result of the aforementioned allocation, 424 single-member districts were established.

The law provided for by-elections to fill vacant seats during the legislative term.

== Candidates ==
=== Nomination rules ===
Spanish males with the right to vote could run for election. Causes of ineligibility applied to a number of territorial officials within their areas of jurisdiction or relevant territories, during their term of office and up to three months afterwards; public contractors; tax collectors; and public debtors. Additionally in Puerto Rico, ineligibility extended to those convicted of slave trade crimes.

Incompatibility rules barred representing multiple constituencies simultaneously, as well as combining legislative roles (deputy, provincial deputy and local councillor) with each other or with any government-appointed post, with exceptions—and as many as 40 deputies allowed to simultaneously benefit from these—including government ministers; and a number of specific posts based in Madrid, such as general officers, chiefs in the Central Administration (provided a public salary of Pts 12,500); senior court officials; university authorities and professors; and chief engineers with two years of service.

== Results ==
=== Overall ===
← Summary of the 10–13 May 1873 Constituent Cortes election results →
Parties and alliances	Popular vote		Seats	
Parties and alliances	Votes	%	Total	+/−
Federal Democratic Republican Party (PRDF)			343	+265
Radical Democratic Party (PDR)			20	−254
Liberal Reformist Party (PLR)			15	+1
Conservative–Constitutional Coalition (C–C)			7	−7
Alfonsist Conservatives (A)			3	−6
Independent Republicans (R.IND)			1	−1
Independent Carlists (CARL.IND)	n/a	n/a	0	−3
Liberal Conservative Party (PLC)	n/a	n/a	0	−1
Independents (INDEP)			17	+6
Vacant			18	±0
Total	1,883,778		424	±0
Votes cast / turnout	1,883,778	40.97		
Abstentions	2,713,700	59.03		
Registered voters	4,597,478			

Seats
PRDF	80.90%
PDR	4.72%
PLR	3.54%
C–C	1.65%
A	0.71%
R.IND	0.24%
INDEP	4.01%
Vacant	4.25%

== Bibliography ==
Legislation

- Decreto electoral para Diputados a Cortes Constituyentes en las provincias de Cuba y Puerto Rico (PDF) (Decree). Madrid Gazette (in Spanish). 14 December 1868.
- Constitución del Estado (PDF) (Constitution). Madrid Gazette (in Spanish). 5 June 1869.
- Ley Electoral (PDF) (Law). Madrid Gazette (in Spanish). 20 August 1870.
- Ley fijando las excepciones al art. 12 de la electoral vigente, relativo a incompatibilidad del cargo de Diputado a Cortes (PDF) (Law). Madrid Gazette (in Spanish). 1 January 1871.
- Ley mandando que los distritos para las elecciones de Diputados a Cortes sean los que se expresan en la división adjunta (PDF) (Law). Madrid Gazette (in Spanish). 1 January 1871.
- Acuerdo reasumiendo la Asamblea Nacional todos los poderes, declarando como forma de Gobierno la República, y que se elija por nombramiento directo de la misma Asamblea el Poder Ejecutivo (PDF) (Law). Madrid Gazette (in Spanish). 11 February 1873.
- Ley convocando Cortes Constituyentes, que se reunirán en Madrid el día 1º de Junio próximo para la organización de la República, y mandando proceder a la elección de Diputados para dichas Cortes en los días 10, 11, 12 y 13 de Mayo (PDF) (Law). Madrid Gazette (in Spanish). 11 March 1873.
- Reglamento para la elección de Diputados a Cortes Constituyentes de la provincia de Puerto Rico (Regulation). Puerto Rico Gazette (in Spanish). National Library of Spain. 16 April 1873.

Other

- López Domínguez, José María (1976). Elecciones y partidos políticos de Puerto Rico: 1809-1898 (PDF) (Thesis) (in Spanish). Vol. 1. Puerto Rico: Complutense University of Madrid.
- Ortega Álvarez, Luis; Santaolaya Machetti, Pablo (1996). "Evolución histórica del sistema electoral español". Revista de las Cortes Generales (in Spanish). 37. Cortes Generales: 65–107. doi:10.33426/rcg/1996/37/784. ISSN 0213-0130.
- BUCM (1997). CAPÍTULO 7. Las elecciones parciales... (PDF) (Thesis) (in Spanish). Complutense University of Madrid. pp. 355–617.
- Roldán de Montaud, Inés (1999). "Política y elecciones en Cuba durante la restauración" (PDF). Revista de Estudios Políticos (in Spanish) (104): 245–287.
- Carreras de Odriozola, Albert; Tafunell Sambola, Xavier (2005) [1989]. Estadísticas históricas de España, siglos XIX-XX (PDF) (in Spanish). Vol. 1 (II ed.). Bilbao: Fundación BBVA. pp. 1072–1097. ISBN 84-96515-00-1. Archived from the original (PDF) on 24 September 2015.
