= April 1872 Spanish general election =

- 2–5 April 1872 (Note: The election in the district of Lérida was postponed to 17–19 June 1872.)

All 424 seats in the Congress of Deputies (Note: Elections in Cuba were indefinitely postponed due to the outbreak of the Ten Years' War, resulting in the vacancy of the 18 seats allocated to the island.) and all 200 seats in the Senate 213 seats needed for a majority in the Congress and 101 in the Senate
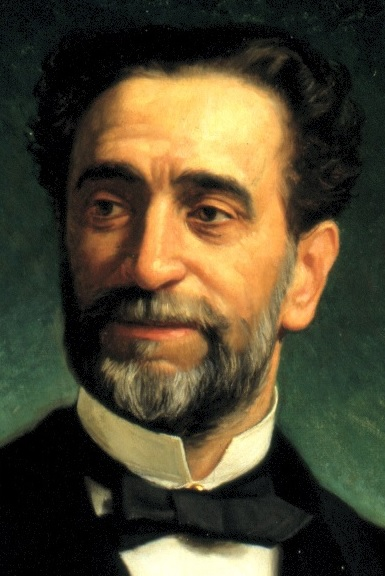

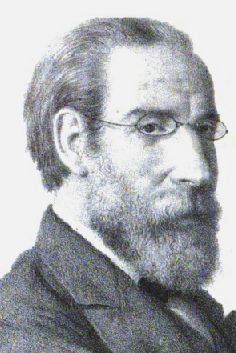

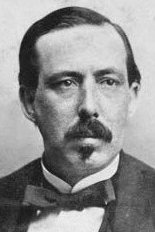
	First party	Second party	Third party
Leader	Práxedes Mateo Sagasta	Francesc Pi i Margall	Manuel Ruiz Zorrilla
Party	Conservative–Constitutional	Republican	Radical
Leader's seat	Gerona; Seville II (Note: Sagasta was elected in both Gerona and Seville II, but the parliament was dissolved before he could chose which district to sit for.)	Barcelona IV	El Burgo de Osma (Note: Zorrilla was also elected in Madrid III; he chose to sit for El Burgo de Osma instead, and resigned as deputy for Madrid III.)
Seats won	236	52	42
Seat change	▲1	0	▲42
Prime Minister before election
Práxedes Mateo Sagasta
Constitutional
Prime Minister after election
Práxedes Mateo Sagasta
Constitutional

A general election was held in Spain from 2 to 5 April 1872 to elect the members of the 2nd Cortes under the Spanish Constitution of 1869, during the Democratic Sexennium period. 406 of 424 seats in the Congress of Deputies and all 200 seats in the Senate were up for election. The election in Cuba was indefinitely postponed.

The internal crisis within the Progressive–Liberal coalition following the assassination of Juan Prim had seen a reorganization of the bloc into the Constitutional Party—in power under Prime Minister Práxedes Mateo Sagasta—and the Radical Democratic Party of Manuel Ruiz Zorrilla. The election, widely rigged in the government's favour, resulted in a parliamentary majority for Sagasta's bloc. However, a political scandal over a secret transfer of funds from an overseas savings bank (the Caja de Ultramar) to the Governance ministry, allegedly used to pay for election expenses, would bring down Sagasta's government in May 1872 and see a new general election being called for August.

== Background ==
The Progressive Party had split into several factions following the death of its leader, Prime Minister Juan Prim: the party's right-wing—together with some members of the Liberal Union—organised as the Constitutional Party under the leadership of General Francisco Serrano and Práxedes Mateo Sagasta, whereas its left-wing—along with the Cimbrios Democrats led by Cristino Martos—formed the Radical Democratic Party under the leadership of Manuel Ruiz Zorrilla.

The political instability resulting from the implosion of the Progressive Party, as well as the unwillingness of the opposition groups—republicans, alfonsists and carlists—to recognize the legitimacy of the new king, led to several governments succeeding each other within a short timespan: Serrano's coalition, formed in the aftermath of Prim's assassination, was replaced by a Radical cabinet under Zorrilla, which then gave way to Constitutional governments under José Malcampo and Sagasta. The latter, realizing he could not secure the confidence of the parliament, chose to ask King Amadeo I for a parliamentary dissolution and call a snap election; however, when the King questioned the fairness of the incoming electoral process, Sagasta himself replied that "[the election] will be as fair as it can be in Spain", hinting at the widespread use of electoral fraud in favour of government candidates. Among the alleged election interference tactics were the suspension of opposition-controlled local councils, instructions given to civil governors to manipulate the election in the government's favour, vote buying through bribery and promises of infrastructure improvements, voter intimidation through the arrest of opposition candidates or disenfranchisement, ballot stuffing, among others.

The Radical Party and the Federal Democratic Republican Party, together with the Catholic–Monarchist Communion and the Moderate Party, reached an electoral cooperation agreement—the "National Coalition"—targeting candidates from the ruling Constitutional Party, under which only one opposition candidate was fielded in each district (typically from the party that had obtained the best results in the previous election).

== Overview ==
Under the 1869 Constitution, the Spanish Cortes were conceived as "co-legislative bodies", forming a nearly perfect bicameral system. Both the Congress of Deputies and the Senate exercised legislative, oversight and budgetary functions, sharing almost equal powers, except in budget laws (taxation and public credit) or military force—whose first reading corresponded to Congress, which also had greater preeminence—and in impeachment processes against government ministers, where Congress handled indictment and the Senate the trial. The electoral and procedural rules in Puerto Rico were the same as those used in the 1871 election.

=== Date ===
The term of each chamber of the Cortes—the Congress and one-quarter of the Senate—expired three years from the date of their previous election, unless they were dissolved earlier. Election day was held over several voting days: the first was used to elect polling station officials, and the remaining ones were devoted to the parliamentary election itself. The previous election was held on 8 March 1871, which meant that the chambers' terms would have expired on 8 March 1874.

The monarch had the prerogative to dissolve both chambers at any given time—either jointly or separately—and call a snap election. Only elections to renew one-quarter of the Senate were constitutionally required to be held concurrently with elections to the Congress, though the former could be renewed in its entirety in the case that a full dissolution was agreed by the monarch.

The Cortes were officially dissolved on 24 January 1872, with the corresponding decree setting election day to start on 2 April and scheduling for both chambers to reconvene on 24 April. In Cuba, elections were indefinitely postponed due to the Ten Years' War.

=== Electoral system ===
Voting for each chamber of the Cortes was based on universal manhood suffrage, comprising all Spanish national males over 25 years of age with full civil rights. In Puerto Rico, voting was based on censitary suffrage, comprising Spanish males of voting age who were either literate or taxpayers with a minimum quota of 16 escudos in direct taxes. Additional restrictions excluded those deprived of political rights or barred from public office by a final sentence, criminally imprisoned (without bail) or convicted, and homeless.

The Congress of Deputies had one seat per 40,000 inhabitants or fraction above 20,000. All were elected in single-member districts using plurality voting and distributed among the provinces of Spain according to population. Cuba and Puerto Rico were allocated 18 and 15 seats, respectively. As a result of the aforementioned allocation, 424 single-member districts were established.

All 200 Senate seats were elected using indirect, two-round majority voting. Delegates chosen by local councils—each of which was assigned an initial minimum of one delegate, with one additional delegate for every six councillors—voted for senators together with provincial deputies. Provinces and the whole of Puerto Rico were allocated four seats each.

For the Congress, the law provided for by-elections to fill vacant seats during the legislative term. For the Senate, any vacancies arising during the legislative term were filled in the chamber's next full or one-quarter election, with senators elected this way serving the remainder of their seat's original term.

== Candidates ==
=== Nomination rules ===
For the Congress, Spanish males with the right to vote could run for election.

For the Senate, eligibility was limited to Spanish males over 40 years of age, with full civil rights, who belonged (or had belonged) to certain categories:

- Holders of a number of senior public or institutional posts, including the presidents of the Congress; the heads and members of higher courts and state institutions; (Note: These comprised the Council of State, the Supreme Court, the Supreme Council of War and the Court of Auditors.) deputies elected in three general elections or in the Constituent Cortes; government ministers; certain general officers (captain generals, admirals, lieutenant generals and vice admirals); ambassadors; archbishops and bishops; university rectors; heads of the royal academies; four-time provincial deputies; and two-time local mayors of towns over 30,000;
- Senior officials after two years of service, including plenipotentiaries and full professors;
- Being among the 50 largest taxpayers by property tax, or among the 20 largest by corporate tax, in each province.

Ineligibility provisions for both chambers also applied to a number of territorial officials within their areas of jurisdiction or relevant territories, during their term of office and up to three months afterwards; public contractors; tax collectors; and public debtors. Additionally in Puerto Rico, ineligibility extended to those convicted of slave trade crimes.

Incompatibility rules barred representing multiple constituencies simultaneously, as well as combining:

- Legislative roles (deputy, senator, provincial deputy and local councillor) with each other;
- The role of senator with any post not explicitly permitted under Senate eligibility requirements;
- The role of deputy with any government-appointed post, with exceptions—and as many as 40 deputies allowed to simultaneously benefit from these—including government ministers; and a number of specific posts based in Madrid, such as general officers, chiefs in the Central Administration (provided a public salary of Pts 12,500); senior court officials; university authorities and professors; and chief engineers with two years of service.

== Results ==
=== Congress of Deputies ===
← Summary of the 2–5 April 1872 Congress of Deputies election results →
Parties and alliances	Popular vote		Seats	
Parties and alliances	Votes	%	Total	+/−
Conservative–Constitutional Coalition (C–C)^{1}			236	+1
Federal Democratic Republican Party (PRDF)			52	±0
Radical Democratic Party (PDR)			42	+42
Catholic–Monarchist Communion (CMC)			38	−13
Moderate Party (PM)			11	−7
Liberal Conservative Party (PLC)			11	+10
Liberal Reformist Party (PLR)			4	−10
Alfonsist Conservatives (A)	n/a	n/a	0	−9
Montpensierists (M)	n/a	n/a	0	−7
Independents (INDEP)			12	−7
Vacant			18	±0
Total			424	±0
Votes cast / turnout				
Abstentions				
Registered voters				
Sources
Footnotes: ^{1} Conservative–Constitutional Coalition results are compared to Monarchist–Democratic Coalition totals in the 1871 election.

Seats
C–C	55.66%
PRDF	12.26%
PDR	9.91%
CMC	8.96%
PM	2.59%
PLC	2.59%
PLR	0.94%
INDEP	2.83%
Vacant	4.25%

== Bibliography ==
Legislation

- Decreto sobre el ejercicio del sufragio universal (PDF) (Decree). Madrid Gazette (in Spanish). 9 November 1868.
- Decreto electoral para Diputados a Cortes Constituyentes en las provincias de Cuba y Puerto Rico (PDF) (Decree). Madrid Gazette (in Spanish). 14 December 1868.
- Constitución del Estado (PDF) (Constitution). Madrid Gazette (in Spanish). 5 June 1869.
- Ley Electoral (PDF) (Law). Madrid Gazette (in Spanish). 20 August 1870.
- Ley fijando las excepciones al art. 12 de la electoral vigente, relativo a incompatibilidad del cargo de Diputado a Cortes (PDF) (Law). Madrid Gazette (in Spanish). 1 January 1871.
- Ley mandando que los distritos para las elecciones de Diputados a Cortes sean los que se expresan en la división adjunta (PDF) (Law). Madrid Gazette (in Spanish). 1 January 1871.
- Decreto mandando se verifiquen en Puerto Rico las elecciones ordinarias de Senadores y Diputados a Cortes (PDF) (Decree). Madrid Gazette (in Spanish). 1 April 1871.
- Decreto declarando disuelto el Senado y el Congreso de los Diputados, y convocando Cortes ordinarias para el 24 de Abril del corriente año (PDF) (Decree). Madrid Gazette (in Spanish). 24 January 1872.
- Decreto para la elección de Senadores y Diputados a Cortes de la provincia de Puerto Rico (Decree). Puerto Rico Gazette (in Spanish). National Library of Spain. 1 March 1872.
- Decreto aplazando las elecciones de Diputados a Cortes en el distrito de Lérida (PDF) (Decree). Madrid Gazette (in Spanish). 19 March 1872.

Other

- Fernández Almagro, Melchor (1943). "Las Cortes del siglo XIX y la práctica electoral" (PDF). Revista de Estudios Políticos (in Spanish) (9–10). Madrid: Centre for Political and Constitutional Studies: 383–419. ISSN 0048-7694.
- López Domínguez, José María (1976). Elecciones y partidos políticos de Puerto Rico: 1809-1898 (PDF) (Thesis) (in Spanish). Vol. 1. Puerto Rico: Complutense University of Madrid.
- Ortega Álvarez, Luis; Santaolaya Machetti, Pablo (1996). "Evolución histórica del sistema electoral español". Revista de las Cortes Generales (in Spanish). 37. Cortes Generales: 65–107. doi:10.33426/rcg/1996/37/784. ISSN 0213-0130.
- BUCM (1997). CAPÍTULO 7. Las elecciones parciales... (PDF) (Thesis) (in Spanish). Complutense University of Madrid. pp. 355–617.
- Roldán de Montaud, Inés (1999). "Política y elecciones en Cuba durante la restauración" (PDF). Revista de Estudios Políticos (in Spanish) (104): 245–287.
- Vilches, Jorge (2001). Progreso y libertad: el Partido Progresista en la revolución liberal española (in Spanish). Madrid: Alianza Editorial. ISBN 8420667684.
- Carreras de Odriozola, Albert; Tafunell Sambola, Xavier (2005) [1989]. Estadísticas históricas de España, siglos XIX-XX (PDF) (in Spanish). Vol. 1 (II ed.). Bilbao: Fundación BBVA. pp. 1072–1097. ISBN 84-96515-00-1. Archived from the original (PDF) on 24 September 2015.
