= 1876 Spanish general election =

- 20–23 January 1876 28–31 January 1876 (Canary Islands); 15–18 February 1876 (Puerto Rico)

All 424 seats in the Congress of Deputies (Note: Elections in Cuba were indefinitely postponed due to the outbreak of the Ten Years' War, resulting in the vacancy of the 18 seats allocated to the island.) and all 200 seats in the Senate 213 seats needed for a majority in the Congress and 101 in the Senate
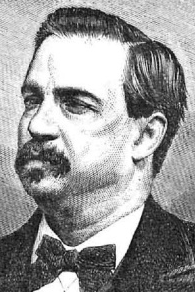

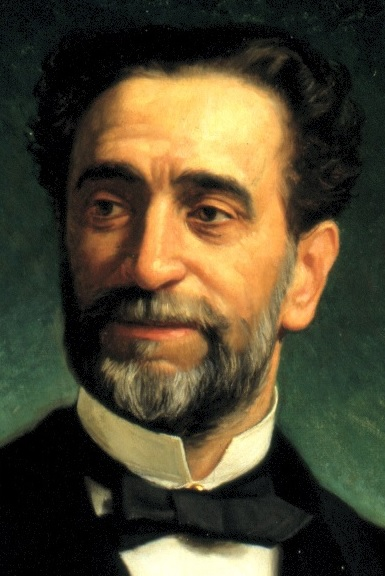

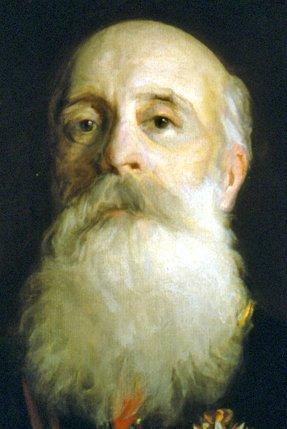

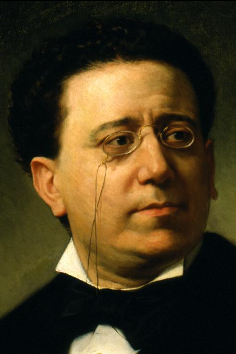

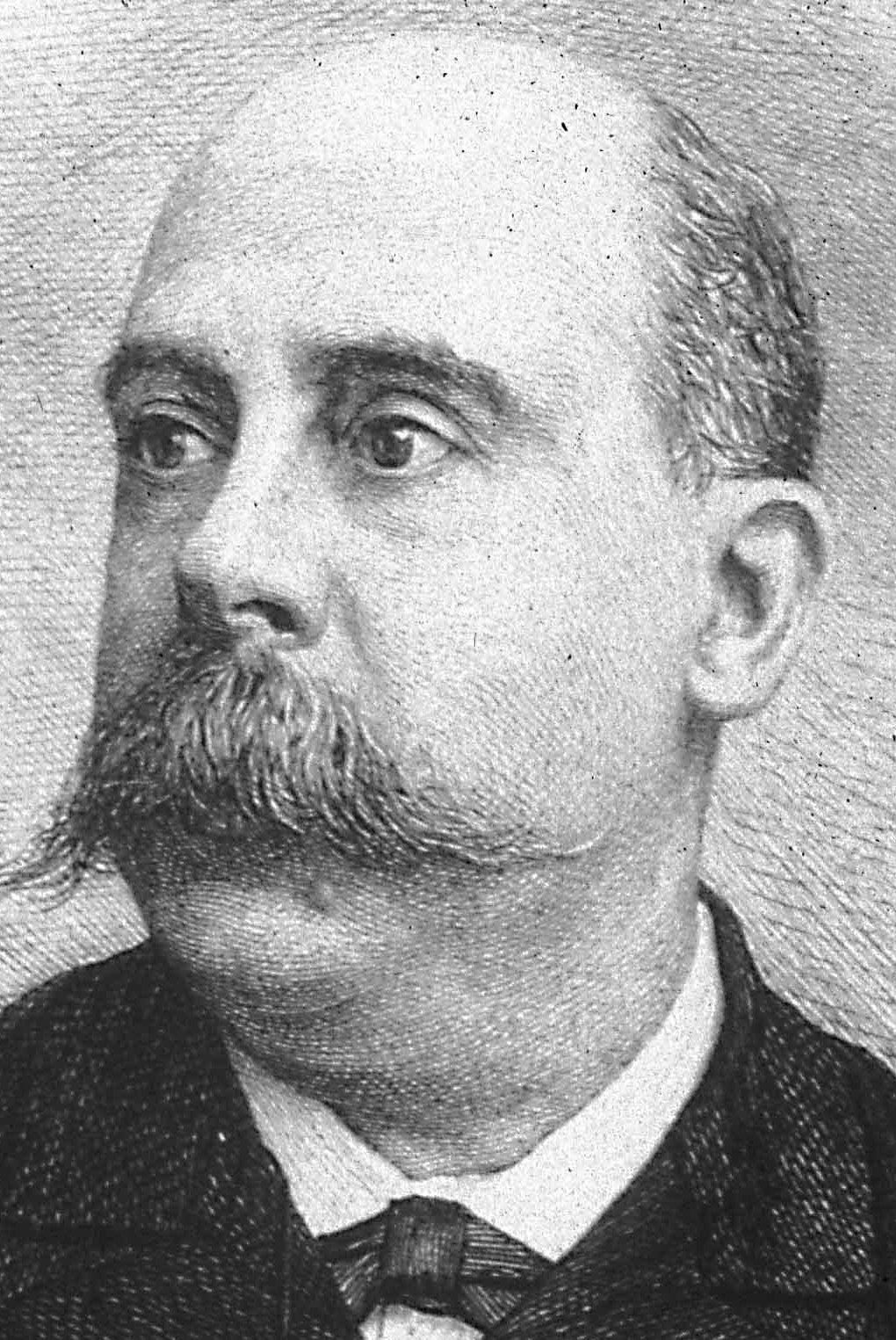
| | First party | Second party | Third party |
|---|---|---|---|
| Leader | Antonio Cánovas del Castillo | Práxedes Mateo Sagasta | Alejandro Pidal y Mon |
| Party | Conservative | Constitutional | Moderate |
| Leader since | 1874 | 1872 | 1876 |
| Leader's seat | Madrid | Zamora | Villaviciosa |
| Last election | 3 seats | 7 seats | 0 seats |
| Seats won | 317 | 48 | 12 |
| Seat change | ▲314 | ▲41 | ▲12 |
| | Fourth party | Fifth party |
| Leader | Cristino Martos | Emilio Castelar |
| Party | Radical | Republican |
| Leader since | 1871 | 1876 |
| Leader's seat | — | Barcelona |
| Last election | 20 seats | 347 seats |
| Seats won | 6 | 1 |
| Seat change | ▼14 | ▼346 |
Prime Minister before election
Antonio Cánovas del Castillo
Conservative
Prime Minister after election
Antonio Cánovas del Castillo
Conservative

A general election was held in Spain from 20 to 23 January 1876 to elect the members of the Constituent Cortes in the Restoration period. 406 of 424 seats in the Congress of Deputies and all 200 seats in the Senate were up for election. In the Canary Islands the election was held from 28 to 31 January, in Puerto Rico it was held from 15 to 18 February, and in Cuba it was indefinitely postponed. On 5 April 1877, another election to the Senate was held.

The electorate consisted of 3,989,612 electors, about 24.0% of the country population.

This was the first election to be held after the end of the First Spanish Republic in 1874. The Third Carlist War and the Ten Years' War were still unraveling at the time, meaning that elections were not held in some districts (namely, those in the Captaincy General of Cuba). The newly founded Liberal Conservative Party of incumbent prime minister Antonio Cánovas del Castillo won an overall majority of seats, paving the way for the adoption of the Spanish Constitution of 1876, which would mark the starting point of the Bourbon Restoration that would last until 1931.

== Background ==
The pronunciamiento—a military coup—of Arsenio Martínez Campos on 29 December 1874 put an end to the First Spanish Republic and hastened the restoration of the Bourbon monarchy around the figure of Prince Alfonso de Borbón, son of former Queen Isabella II. An interim government led by Cánovas del Castillo was confirmed by King Alfonso XII upon disembarking in Barcelona on 9 January 1875.

== Overview ==
Under the Sandhurst Manifesto, the Spanish Cortes were conceived as a provisional assembly tasked with drafting a new constitution that would re-establish the monarchy around Prince Alfonso de Borbón. The electoral and procedural rules of the Democratic Sexennium remained in force, including the provisions for both the Congress of Deputies and the Senate under the 1869 Constitution, but excluding the 1873 amendments. For Puerto Rico, those were the same as the used in the 1871 election.

=== Date ===
The term of each chamber of the Cortes—the Congress and one-quarter of the Senate—expired three years from the date of their previous election, unless they were dissolved earlier. Election day was held over several voting days: the first was used to elect polling station officials, and the remaining ones were devoted to the parliamentary election itself.

The monarch had the prerogative to dissolve both chambers at any given time—either jointly or separately—and call a snap election. Only elections to renew one-quarter of the Senate were constitutionally required to be held concurrently with elections to the Congress, though the former could be renewed in its entirety in the case that a full dissolution was agreed by the monarch.

The Cortes had been officially dissolved since 8 January 1874, following the coup d'état of Pavía. The election decree was issued on 31 December 1875, setting election day to start on 20 January 1876 in peninsular Spain, on 28 January in the Canary Islands, and on 15 February in Puerto Rico, and scheduling for both chambers to reconvene on 15 February. In Cuba, elections were indefinitely postponed due to the Ten Years' War.

=== Electoral system ===
Voting for each chamber of the Cortes was based on universal manhood suffrage, comprising all Spanish national males over 25 years of age with full civil rights. In Puerto Rico, voting was based on censitary suffrage, comprising Spanish males of voting age who were either literate or taxpayers with a minimum quota of 16 escudos in direct taxes. Additional restrictions excluded those deprived of political rights or barred from public office by a final sentence, criminally imprisoned (without bail) or convicted, and homeless.

The Congress of Deputies had one seat per 40,000 inhabitants or fraction above 20,000. All were elected in single-member districts using plurality voting and distributed among the provinces of Spain according to population. Cuba and Puerto Rico were allocated 18 and 15 seats, respectively. As a result of the aforementioned allocation, 424 single-member districts were established.

All 200 Senate seats were elected using indirect, two-round majority voting. Delegates chosen by local councils—each of which was assigned an initial minimum of one delegate, with one additional delegate for every six councillors—voted for senators together with provincial deputies. Provinces and the whole of Puerto Rico were allocated four seats each.

For the Congress, the law provided for by-elections to fill vacant seats during the legislative term. For the Senate, any vacancies arising during the legislative term were filled in the chamber's next full or one-quarter election, with senators elected this way serving the remainder of their seat's original term.

== Candidates ==
=== Nomination rules ===
For the Congress, Spanish males with the right to vote could run for election.

For the Senate, eligibility was limited to Spanish males over 40 years of age, with full civil rights, who belonged (or had belonged) to certain categories:

- Holders of a number of senior public or institutional posts, including the presidents of the Congress; the heads and members of higher courts and state institutions; (Note: These comprised the Council of State, the Supreme Court, the Supreme Council of War and the Court of Auditors.) deputies elected in three general elections or in the Constituent Cortes; government ministers; certain general officers (captain generals, admirals, lieutenant generals and vice admirals); ambassadors; archbishops and bishops; university rectors; heads of the royal academies; four-time provincial deputies; and two-time local mayors of towns over 30,000;
- Senior officials after two years of service, including plenipotentiaries and full professors;
- Being among the 50 largest taxpayers by property tax, or among the 20 largest by corporate tax, in each province.

Ineligibility provisions for both chambers also applied to a number of territorial officials within their areas of jurisdiction or relevant territories, during their term of office and up to three months afterwards; public contractors; tax collectors; and public debtors. Additionally in Puerto Rico, ineligibility extended to those convicted of slave trade crimes.

Incompatibility rules barred representing multiple constituencies simultaneously, as well as combining:

- Legislative roles (deputy, senator, provincial deputy and local councillor) with each other;
- The role of senator with any post not explicitly permitted under Senate eligibility requirements;
- The role of deputy with any government-appointed post, with exceptions—and as many as 40 deputies allowed to simultaneously benefit from these—including government ministers; and a number of specific posts based in Madrid, such as general officers, chiefs in the Central Administration (provided a public salary of Pts 12,500); senior court officials; university authorities and professors; and chief engineers with two years of service.

== Results ==
=== Congress of Deputies ===
← Summary of the 20–23 January 1876 (Note: In the Canary Islands, the election was held from 28 to 31 January 1876. In Puerto Rico, it was held from 15 to 18 February 1876.) Congress of Deputies election results →
| Parties and alliances | Popular vote | | Seats |
| Parties and alliances | Votes | % | Seats |
|---|---|---|---|
| Liberal Conservative Party (Conservadores) | | | 343 |
| Liberal Conservative Party (PLC) | | | 328 |
| Unconditional Spanish Party (PIE) | | | 15 |
| Constitutional Party (Constitucionales) | | | 37 |
| Moderate Party (Moderados) | | | 11 |
| Radical Democratic Party (Radicales) | | | 5 |
| Parliamentary Centre (Centro) | | | 4 |
| Federal Democratic Republican Party (Federales) | | | 1 |
| Independents (Independientes) | | | 5 |
| Total | | | 406 |
| Votes cast / turnout | | | |
| Abstentions | | | |
| Registered voters | | | |

Seats
| Conservative | 84.48% |
| Constitutional | 9.11% |
| Moderate | 2.71% |
| Radical | 1.23% |
| Centre | 0.99% |
| Fed. Republican | 0.25% |
| Independent | 1.23% |

== Bibliography ==
Legislation

- Decreto sobre el ejercicio del sufragio universal (PDF) (Decree). Madrid Gazette (in Spanish). 9 November 1868.
- Decreto electoral para Diputados a Cortes Constituyentes en las provincias de Cuba y Puerto Rico (PDF) (Decree). Madrid Gazette (in Spanish). 14 December 1868.
- Constitución del Estado (PDF) (Constitution). Madrid Gazette (in Spanish). 5 June 1869.
- Ley Electoral (PDF) (Law). Madrid Gazette (in Spanish). 20 August 1870.
- Ley fijando las excepciones al art. 12 de la electoral vigente, relativo a incompatibilidad del cargo de Diputado a Cortes (PDF) (Law). Madrid Gazette (in Spanish). 1 January 1871.
- Ley mandando que los distritos para las elecciones de Diputados a Cortes sean los que se expresan en la división adjunta (PDF) (Law). Madrid Gazette (in Spanish). 1 January 1871.
- Decreto mandando se verifiquen en Puerto Rico las elecciones ordinarias de Senadores y Diputados a Cortes (PDF) (Decree). Madrid Gazette (in Spanish). 1 April 1871.
- Decreto disponiendo que las elecciones ordinarias de Senadores y Diputados a Cortes en la provincia de Puerto Rico se verifiquen con arreglo a las prescripciones del Real decreto de 1.º de Abril de 1871 (PDF) (Decree). Madrid Gazette (in Spanish). 29 June 1872.
- Decreto declarando disueltas las Cortes Constituyentes de 1873 (PDF) (Decree). Madrid Gazette (in Spanish). 8 January 1874.
- Real decreto disponiendo que las Cortes de la Monarquía española se reúnan el 15 de Febrero, y señalando los días en que han de comenzar las elecciones de Senadores y de Diputados (PDF) (Royal Decree). Madrid Gazette (in Spanish). 31 December 1875.
- Real decreto dictando reglas sobre incompatibilidades parlamentarias (PDF) (Royal Decree). Madrid Gazette (in Spanish). 11 January 1876.
- Decreto mandando se verifiquen las elecciones de Senadores y Diputados a Cortes en la provincia de Puerto Rico (Decree). Puerto Rico Gazette (in Spanish). National Library of Spain. 2 February 1876.

Other

- López Domínguez, José María (1976). Elecciones y partidos políticos de Puerto Rico: 1809-1898 (PDF) (Thesis) (in Spanish). Vol. 1. Puerto Rico: Complutense University of Madrid.
- Ortega Álvarez, Luis; Santaolaya Machetti, Pablo (1996). "Evolución histórica del sistema electoral español". Revista de las Cortes Generales (in Spanish). 37. Cortes Generales: 65–107. doi:10.33426/rcg/1996/37/784. ISSN 0213-0130.
- Roldán de Montaud, Inés (1999). "Política y elecciones en Cuba durante la restauración" (PDF). Revista de Estudios Políticos (in Spanish) (104): 245–287.
- Carreras de Odriozola, Albert; Tafunell Sambola, Xavier (2005) [1989]. Estadísticas históricas de España, siglos XIX-XX (PDF) (in Spanish). Vol. 1 (II ed.). Bilbao: Fundación BBVA. pp. 1072–1097. ISBN 84-96515-00-1. Archived from the original (PDF) on 24 September 2015.
