= August 1872 Spanish general election =

- 24–27 August 1872

All 424 seats in the Congress of Deputies (Note: Elections in Cuba were indefinitely postponed due to the outbreak of the Ten Years' War, resulting in the vacancy of the 18 seats allocated to the island.) and all 200 seats in the Senate 213 seats needed for a majority in the Congress and 101 in the Senate
- Turnout: 1,900,180
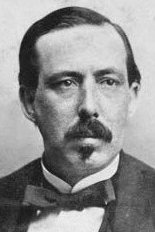

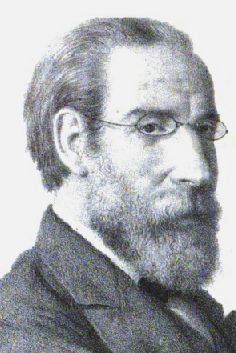

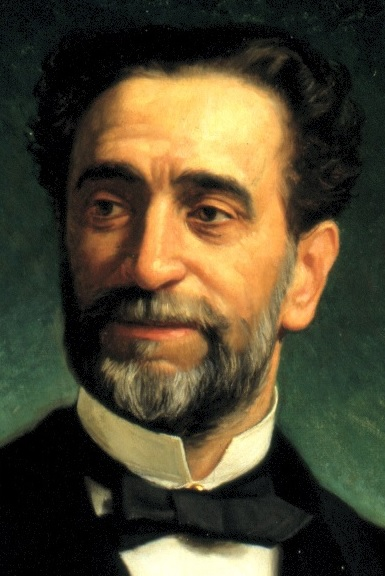
	First party	Second party	Third party
Leader	Manuel Ruiz Zorrilla	Francesc Pi i Margall	Práxedes Mateo Sagasta
Party	Radical	Republican	Conservative–Constitutional
Leader's seat	Madrid III (Note: Zorrilla was also elected in El Burgo de Osma; he chose to sit for Madrid III instead, and resigned as deputy for El Burgo de Osma.)	Barcelona IV	—
Seats won	274	78	14
Seat change	▲232	▲26	▼222
Popular vote	1,321,338	379,345	120,543
Percentage	69.5%	20.0%	6.3%
Prime Minister before election
Manuel Ruiz Zorrilla
Radical
Prime Minister after election
Manuel Ruiz Zorrilla
Radical

A general election was held in Spain from 24 to 27 August 1872 to elect the members of the 3rd Cortes under the Spanish Constitution of 1869, during the Democratic Sexennium period. 406 of 424 seats in the Congress of Deputies and all 200 seats in the Senate were up for election. The election in Cuba was indefinitely postponed.

Most of the opposition to the Radical Democratic Party of Manuel Ruiz Zorrilla opted to boycott the election—with the Carlists completely disengaging from electoral participation following the outbreak of the Third Carlist War in April—whereas for the Federal Democratic Republican Party only the "benevolent" faction chose to participate. As a result, the Radicals were able to secure a commanding parliamentary majority without needing to resort to electoral fraud, albeit under a low voter turnout.

== Background ==
The parliament elected in the April 1872 general election was short-lived, as the government of Práxedes Mateo Sagasta was forced to resign in May following a political scandal over a secret transfer of funds from an overseas savings bank (the Caja de Ultramar) to the Governance ministry that was allegedly used to pay for election expenses. Following a 20-day government under Francisco Serrano, King Amadeo I appointed Manuel Ruiz Zorrilla as new prime minister, who formed a Radical Democratic Party cabinet and called a snap election to provide itself with a parliamentary majority.

Zorrilla's government generally attempted to avoid resorting to fraud in the organization of the election process, instructing the provincial civil governors not to impose or recommend official candidates, reforming the census in those places where voters had been disenfranchised from the electoral roll—mostly to facilitate Sagasta's victory in April—and reinstating local councils which had been suspended. While this did not prevent the existence of allegations of government interference, the election was widely seen as more free and fair than previous ones.

Most of the opposition to the Radical government had chosen not to participate in the election: the Constitutional Party and the Alfonsists fielded few candidates, mostly opting for a strategy of "retreat" (retraimiento, akin to election boycott), whereas for the Federal Democratic Republican Party only the "benevolent" faction chose to participate. Discontent with Amadeo's proclamation as King of Spain paved the way for Carlists to withdraw from electoral participation and wage the Third Carlist War in favour of their pretender, Carlos de Borbón, who tried to earn the support of various Spanish regions by promising to reintroduce various area-specific customs and laws (particularly, the Catalan, Valencian and Aragonese fueros which had been abolished at the beginning of the 18th century by King Philip V in his unilateral Nueva Planta decrees).

== Overview ==
Under the 1869 Constitution, the Spanish Cortes were conceived as "co-legislative bodies", forming a nearly perfect bicameral system. Both the Congress of Deputies and the Senate exercised legislative, oversight and budgetary functions, sharing almost equal powers, except in budget laws (taxation and public credit) or military force—whose first reading corresponded to Congress, which also had greater preeminence—and in impeachment processes against government ministers, where Congress handled indictment and the Senate the trial. The electoral and procedural rules in Puerto Rico were the same as those used in the 1871 election.

=== Date ===
The term of each chamber of the Cortes—the Congress and one-quarter of the Senate—expired three years from the date of their previous election, unless they were dissolved earlier. Election day was held over several voting days: the first was used to elect polling station officials, and the remaining ones were devoted to the parliamentary election itself. The previous election was held on 2 April 1872, which meant that the chambers' terms would have expired on 2 April 1875.

The monarch had the prerogative to dissolve both chambers at any given time—either jointly or separately—and call a snap election. Only elections to renew one-quarter of the Senate were constitutionally required to be held concurrently with elections to the Congress, though the former could be renewed in its entirety in the case that a full dissolution was agreed by the monarch.

The Cortes were officially dissolved on 28 June 1872, with the corresponding decree setting election day to start on 24 August and scheduling for both chambers to reconvene on 15 September. In Cuba, elections were indefinitely postponed due to the Ten Years' War.

=== Electoral system ===
Voting for each chamber of the Cortes was based on universal manhood suffrage, comprising all Spanish national males over 25 years of age with full civil rights. In Puerto Rico, voting was based on censitary suffrage, comprising Spanish males of voting age who were either literate or taxpayers with a minimum quota of 16 escudos in direct taxes. Additional restrictions excluded those deprived of political rights or barred from public office by a sentence, criminally imprisoned (without bail) or convicted, and homeless.

The Congress of Deputies had one seat per 40,000 inhabitants or fraction above 20,000. All were elected in single-member districts using plurality voting and distributed among the provinces of Spain according to population. Cuba and Puerto Rico were allocated 18 and 15 seats, respectively. As a result of the aforementioned allocation, 424 single-member districts were established.

All 200 Senate seats were elected using indirect, two-round majority voting. Delegates chosen by local councils—each of which was assigned an initial minimum of one delegate, with one additional delegate for every six councillors—voted for senators together with provincial deputies. Provinces and the whole of Puerto Rico were allocated four seats each.

For the Congress, the law provided for by-elections to fill vacant seats during the legislative term. For the Senate, any vacancies arising during the legislative term were filled in the chamber's next full or one-quarter election, with senators elected this way serving the remainder of their seat's original term.

== Candidates ==
=== Nomination rules ===
For the Congress, Spanish males with the right to vote could run for election.

For the Senate, eligibility was limited to Spanish males over 40 years of age, with full civil rights, who belonged (or had belonged) to certain categories:

- Holders of a number of senior public or institutional posts, including the presidents of the Congress; the heads and members of higher courts and state institutions; (Note: These comprised the Council of State, the Supreme Court, the Supreme Council of War and the Court of Auditors.) deputies elected in three general elections or in the Constituent Cortes; government ministers; certain general officers (captain generals, admirals, lieutenant generals and vice admirals); ambassadors; archbishops and bishops; university rectors; heads of the royal academies; four-time provincial deputies; and two-time local mayors of towns over 30,000;
- Senior officials after two years of service, including plenipotentiaries and full professors;
- Being among the 50 largest taxpayers by property tax, or among the 20 largest by corporate tax, in each province.

Ineligibility provisions for both chambers also applied to a number of territorial officials within their areas of jurisdiction or relevant territories, during their term of office and up to three months afterwards; public contractors; tax collectors; and public debtors. Additionally in Puerto Rico, ineligibility extended to those convicted of slave trade crimes.

Incompatibility rules barred representing multiple constituencies simultaneously, as well as combining:

- Legislative roles (deputy, senator, provincial deputy and local councillor) with each other;
- The role of senator with any post not explicitly permitted under Senate eligibility requirements;
- The role of deputy with any government-appointed post, with exceptions—and as many as 40 deputies allowed to simultaneously benefit from these—including government ministers; and a number of specific posts based in Madrid, such as general officers, chiefs in the Central Administration (provided a public salary of Pts 12,500); senior court officials; university authorities and professors; and chief engineers with two years of service.

== Results ==
=== Congress of Deputies ===
← Summary of the 24–27 August 1872 Congress of Deputies election results →
Parties and alliances	Popular vote		Seats	
Parties and alliances	Votes	%	Total	+/−
Radical Democratic Party (PDR)	1,321,338	69.54	274	+232
Federal Democratic Republican Party (PRDF)	379,345	19.96	78	+26
Conservative–Constitutional Coalition (C–C)	120,543	6.34	14	−222
Alfonsist Conservatives (A)	36,325	1.91	9	+9
Independent Republicans (R.IND)	9,502	0.50	2	+2
Liberal Reformist Party (PLR)	9,463	0.50	14	+10
Independent Carlists (CARL.IND)^{1}	5,870	0.31	3	−35
Liberal Conservative Party (PLC)	1,292	0.07	1	−10
Moderate Party (PM)	n/a	n/a	0	−11
Independents (INDEP)	5,182	0.27	11	−1
Others	11,320	0.60	0	±0
Vacant			18	±0
Total	1,900,180		424	±0
Votes cast / turnout	1,900,180			
Abstentions				
Registered voters				
Sources
Footnotes: ^{1} Independent Carlists results are compared to Catholic–Monarchist Communion totals in the April 1872 election.

Popular vote
PDR	69.54%
PRDF	19.96%
C–C	6.34%
A	1.91%
R.IND	0.50%
PLR	0.50%
CARL.IND	0.31%
PLC	0.07%
INDEP	0.27%
Others	0.60%

Seats
PDR	64.62%
PRDF	18.40%
C–C	3.30%
PLR	3.30%
A	2.12%
CARL.IND	0.71%
R.IND	0.47%
PLC	0.24%
INDEP	2.59%
Vacant	4.25%

== Bibliography ==
Legislation

- Decreto sobre el ejercicio del sufragio universal (PDF) (Decree). Madrid Gazette (in Spanish). 9 November 1868.
- Decreto electoral para Diputados a Cortes Constituyentes en las provincias de Cuba y Puerto Rico (PDF) (Decree). Madrid Gazette (in Spanish). 14 December 1868.
- Constitución del Estado (PDF) (Constitution). Madrid Gazette (in Spanish). 5 June 1869.
- Ley Electoral (PDF) (Law). Madrid Gazette (in Spanish). 20 August 1870.
- Ley fijando las excepciones al art. 12 de la electoral vigente, relativo a incompatibilidad del cargo de Diputado a Cortes (PDF) (Law). Madrid Gazette (in Spanish). 1 January 1871.
- Ley mandando que los distritos para las elecciones de Diputados a Cortes sean los que se expresan en la división adjunta (PDF) (Law). Madrid Gazette (in Spanish). 1 January 1871.
- Decreto mandando se verifiquen en Puerto Rico las elecciones ordinarias de Senadores y Diputados a Cortes (PDF) (Decree). Madrid Gazette (in Spanish). 1 April 1871.
- Decretos declarando disueltos el Senado y el Congreso de los Diputados, convocando Cortes ordinarias para el de Setiembre, y fijando la fecha de las elecciones en la Península e islas adyacentes y Puerto Rico el 24 de Agosto próximo (PDF) (Decrees). Madrid Gazette (in Spanish). 28 June 1872.
- Decreto disponiendo que las elecciones ordinarias de Senadores y Diputados a Cortes en la provincia de Puerto Rico se verifiquen con arreglo a las prescripciones del Real decreto de 1.º de Abril de 1871 (PDF) (Decree). Madrid Gazette (in Spanish). 29 June 1872.

Other

- López Domínguez, José María (1976). Elecciones y partidos políticos de Puerto Rico: 1809-1898 (PDF) (Thesis) (in Spanish). Vol. 1. Puerto Rico: Complutense University of Madrid.
- Ortega Álvarez, Luis; Santaolaya Machetti, Pablo (1996). "Evolución histórica del sistema electoral español". Revista de las Cortes Generales (in Spanish). 37. Cortes Generales: 65–107. doi:10.33426/rcg/1996/37/784. ISSN 0213-0130.
- BUCM (1997). CAPÍTULO 7. Las elecciones parciales... (PDF) (Thesis) (in Spanish). Complutense University of Madrid. pp. 355–617.
- Roldán de Montaud, Inés (1999). "Política y elecciones en Cuba durante la restauración" (PDF). Revista de Estudios Políticos (in Spanish) (104): 245–287.
- Carreras de Odriozola, Albert; Tafunell Sambola, Xavier (2005) [1989]. Estadísticas históricas de España, siglos XIX-XX (PDF) (in Spanish). Vol. 1 (II ed.). Bilbao: Fundación BBVA. pp. 1072–1097. ISBN 84-96515-00-1. Archived from the original (PDF) on 24 September 2015.
