= Results of the 1876 Spanish general election =

Wikimedia list article

This page is a list of the results of the 1876 Spanish general election by constituencies.

== Álava - 2 seats ==
=== Vitoria ===
| Candidate | Party | Votes | % |
|---|---|---|---|
| Mateo Benigno de Moraza | Conservative | 791 | 100.00 |
| Total | | 791 | 100.00 |
| Total votes | | 808 | – |
| Registered voters/turnout | | 4,944 | 16.34 |

=== Amurrio ===
| Candidate | Party | Votes | % |
|---|---|---|---|
| Bruno Martínez de Aragón | Conservative | 225 | 100.00 |
| Total | | 225 | 100.00 |
| Total votes | | 225 | – |
| Registered voters/turnout | | 312 | 72.12 |

== Albacete - 5 seats ==
=== Albacete ===
| Candidate | Party | Votes | % |
|---|---|---|---|
| Marquess of Salamanca | Conservative | 6,707 | 100.00 |
| Total | | 6,707 | 100.00 |
| Total votes | | 6,709 | – |
| Registered voters/turnout | | 8,474 | 79.17 |

=== Alcaraz ===
| Candidate | Party | Votes | % |
|---|---|---|---|
| Luis Estrada | Conservative | 9,422 | 100.00 |
| Total | | 9,422 | 100.00 |
| Total votes | | 9,423 | – |

=== Almansa ===
| Candidate | Party | Votes | % |
|---|---|---|---|
| Miguel Ochoa Llácer | Conservative | 7,108 | 100.00 |
| Total | | 7,108 | 100.00 |
| Total votes | | 7,111 | – |
| Registered voters/turnout | | 9,357 | 76.00 |

=== Casas-Ibáñez ===
| Candidate | Party | Votes | % |
|---|---|---|---|
| Antonio María Fabié | Conservative | 5,377 | |
| González Conde | Independent | | |
| Total | | | |
| Total votes | | 6,789 | – |
| Registered voters/turnout | | 9,076 | 74.80 |

=== Hellín ===
| Candidate | Party | Votes | % |
|---|---|---|---|
| Carlos María Perier | Conservative | 8,156 | 100.00 |
| Total | | 8,156 | 100.00 |
| Total votes | | 8,157 | – |

== Alicante - 10 seats ==
=== Alcoy ===
| Candidate | Party | Votes | % |
|---|---|---|---|
| Juan Francisco Camacho | Constitutional | 6,499 | 100.00 |
| Total | | 6,499 | 100.00 |
| Total votes | | 6,518 | – |
| Registered voters/turnout | | 10,815 | 60.27 |

=== Alicante ===
| Candidate | Party | Votes | % |
|---|---|---|---|
| Ramón Campos Doménech | Conservative | 6,520 | 100.00 |
| Total | | 6,520 | 100.00 |
| Total votes | | 6,523 | – |

=== Denia ===
| Candidate | Party | Votes | % |
|---|---|---|---|
| José Luis Albareda y Sezde | Constitutional | 7,047 | |
| Lauzat | Radical | | |
| Total | | | |
| Total votes | | 7,106 | – |

=== Dolores ===
| Candidate | Party | Votes | % |
|---|---|---|---|
| Arturo de Pardo Inchausti | Conservative | 6,302 | 100.00 |
| Total | | 6,302 | 100.00 |
| Total votes | | 6,303 | – |
| Registered voters/turnout | | 7,192 | 87.64 |

=== Elche ===
| Candidate | Party | Votes | % |
|---|---|---|---|
| Federico Bas Moró | Conservative | 6,508 | 100.00 |
| Total | | 6,508 | 100.00 |
| Total votes | | 6,508 | – |
| Registered voters/turnout | | 10,329 | 63.01 |

=== Monóvar ===
| Candidate | Party | Votes | % |
|---|---|---|---|
| José Amat y Sempere | Conservative | 5,841 | |
| José Abascal y Carredano | Constitutional | | |
| Total | | | |
| Total votes | | 6,352 | – |
| Registered voters/turnout | | 8,815 | 72.06 |

=== Orihuela ===
| Candidate | Party | Votes | % |
|---|---|---|---|
| José Moreno Leante | Conservative | 5,655 | |
| Tomás Capdepón | Constitutional | | |
| Total | | | |
| Total votes | | 5,903 | – |

=== Pego ===
| Candidate | Party | Votes | % |
|---|---|---|---|
| Pedro Pascual Sala y Císcar | Conservative | 6,834 | 100.00 |
| Total | | 6,834 | 100.00 |
| Total votes | | 7,174 | – |

=== Villajoyosa ===
| Candidate | Party | Votes | % |
|---|---|---|---|
| Alejandro Groizard y Gómez de la Serna | Conservative | 5,348 | 100.00 |
| Total | | 5,348 | 100.00 |
| Total votes | | 5,365 | – |

=== Villena ===
| Candidate | Party | Votes | % |
|---|---|---|---|
| Gregorio Cruzada Villaamil | Conservative | 6,327 | 100.00 |
| Total | | 6,327 | 100.00 |
| Total votes | | 6,327 | – |

== Almería - 8 seats ==
=== Almería ===
| Candidate | Party | Votes | % |
|---|---|---|---|
| Bernabé Morcillo de la Cuesta | Conservative | 6,627 | 100.00 |
| Total | | 6,627 | 100.00 |
| Total votes | | 6,627 | – |
| Registered voters/turnout | | 8,719 | 76.01 |

=== Berja ===
| Candidate | Party | Votes | % |
|---|---|---|---|
| Telesforo González Vázquez | Conservative | 7,569 | 100.00 |
| Total | | 7,569 | 100.00 |
| Total votes | | 7,569 | – |
| Registered voters/turnout | | 8,862 | 85.41 |

=== Canjayar ===
| Candidate | Party | Votes | % |
|---|---|---|---|
| Bernardo de Toro y Moya | Conservative | 4,691 | |
| Tortosa | Independent | | |
| Total | | | |
| Total votes | | 6,400 | – |

=== Gergal ===
| Candidate | Party | Votes | % |
|---|---|---|---|
| Arcadio Roda Rivas | Conservative | 5,313 | |
| Joaquín Chinchilla y Diez de Oñate | Constitutional | | |
| Total | | | |
| Total votes | | 7,767 | – |
| Registered voters/turnout | | 8,990 | 86.40 |

=== Purchena ===
| Candidate | Party | Votes | % |
|---|---|---|---|
| Carlos Navarro Rodrigo | Constitutional | 7,939 | 100.00 |
| Total | | 7,939 | 100.00 |
| Total votes | | 8,055 | – |
| Registered voters/turnout | | 10,636 | 75.73 |

=== Sorbas ===
| Candidate | Party | Votes | % |
|---|---|---|---|
| Juan García López | Conservative | 7,757 | 100.00 |
| Total | | 7,757 | 100.00 |
| Total votes | | 7,757 | – |
| Registered voters/turnout | | 9,799 | 79.16 |

=== Vélez-Rubio ===
| Candidate | Party | Votes | % |
|---|---|---|---|
| Joaquín Fontes Contreras | Conservative | 8,588 | 100.00 |
| Total | | 8,588 | 100.00 |
| Total votes | | 8,588 | – |
| Registered voters/turnout | | 9,489 | 90.50 |

=== Vera ===
| Candidate | Party | Votes | % |
|---|---|---|---|
| Juan Anglada y Ruiz | Radical | 5,118 | |
| José de Cárdenas Uriarte | Conservative | | |
| Total | | | |
| Total votes | | 8,806 | – |

== Ávila - 4 seats ==
=== Ávila ===
| Candidate | Party | Votes | % |
|---|---|---|---|
| José de Cárdenas Uriate | Conservative | 6,461 | 100.00 |
| Total | | 6,461 | 100.00 |
| Total votes | | 6,527 | – |

=== Arenas de San Pedro ===
| Candidate | Party | Votes | % |
|---|---|---|---|
| Celestino Rico y García | Conservative | 6,555 | 100.00 |
| Total | | 6,555 | 100.00 |
| Total votes | | 6,562 | – |

=== Arévalo ===
| Candidate | Party | Votes | % |
|---|---|---|---|
| Telesforo Gómez Rodríguez | Conservative | 6,015 | 100.00 |
| Total | | 6,015 | 100.00 |
| Total votes | | 6,093 | – |

=== Piedrahita ===
| Candidate | Party | Votes | % |
|---|---|---|---|
| Francisco Silvela | Conservative | 7,017 | 100.00 |
| Total | | 7,017 | 100.00 |
| Total votes | | 7,023 | – |

== Badajoz - 10 seats ==
=== Badajoz ===
| Candidate | Party | Votes | % |
|---|---|---|---|
| Manuel María Albarrán y García-Marqués | Conservative | 4,425 | |
| Leopoldo Molano y Martínez | Moderate | | |
| Total | | | |
| Total votes | | 8,165 | – |

=== Jerez de los Caballeros ===
| Candidate | Party | Votes | % |
|---|---|---|---|
| Luis Villanueva y Cañedo | Moderate | 4,761 | |
| Fernando Montero de Espinosa y Herrera | Conservative | | |
| Total | | | |
| Total votes | | 8,815 | – |

=== Zafra ===
| Candidate | Party | Votes | % |
|---|---|---|---|
| Nicolás Hurtado y Moreno | Conservative | 7,873 | 100.00 |
| Total | | 7,873 | 100.00 |
| Total votes | | 7,864 | – |

=== Don Benito ===
| Candidate | Party | Votes | % |
|---|---|---|---|
| Pedro Nicomedes Campos de Orellana | Conservative | 5,713 | 100.00 |
| Total | | 5,713 | 100.00 |
| Total votes | | 5,722 | – |
| Registered voters/turnout | | 9,919 | 57.69 |

=== Don Benito ===
| Candidate | Party | Votes | % |
|---|---|---|---|
| Antonio Fernández Durán y Bernaldo de Quirós | Conservative | 5,903 | |
| Antonio Cortijo | Independent | | |
| Total | | | |
| Total votes | | 8,364 | – |
| Registered voters/turnout | | 9,834 | 85.05 |

=== Almendralejo ===
| Candidate | Party | Votes | % |
|---|---|---|---|
| Baltasar López de Ayala | Conservative | 5,483 | |
| Abdon Salamanca | Independent | | |
| Total | | | |
| Total votes | | 8,708 | – |

=== Castuera ===
| Candidate | Party | Votes | % |
|---|---|---|---|
| José Moreno Nieto | Conservative | 5,444 | |
| Alejandro Groizard y Gómez de la Serna | Conservative | | |
| Total | | | |
| Total votes | | 8,344 | – |

=== Fregenal de la Sierra ===
| Candidate | Party | Votes | % |
|---|---|---|---|
| Gonzalo Sánchez Arjona | Moderate | 4,034 | |
| Luis Macías y Méndez | Conservative | | |
| Total | | | |
| Total votes | | 8,090 | – |

=== Llerena ===
| Candidate | Party | Votes | % |
|---|---|---|---|
| Adelardo López de Ayala | Conservative | 8,720 | 100.00 |
| Total | | 8,720 | 100.00 |
| Total votes | | 8,728 | – |
| Registered voters/turnout | | 10,713 | 81.47 |

=== Mérida ===
| Candidate | Party | Votes | % |
|---|---|---|---|
| Cipriano Piñero | Conservative | 6,050 | 100.00 |
| Total | | 6,050 | 100.00 |
| Total votes | | 6,128 | – |
| Registered voters/turnout | | 10,317 | 59.40 |
