= 1879 Spanish general election =

- 20 April 1879 (Congress); 3 May 1879 (Senate)

All 431 seats in the Congress of Deputies and 180 (of 360) seats in the Senate 216 seats needed for a majority in the Congress of Deputies
- Registered: 952,000
- Turnout: 621,436 (65.3%)
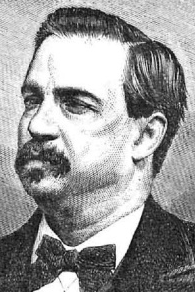

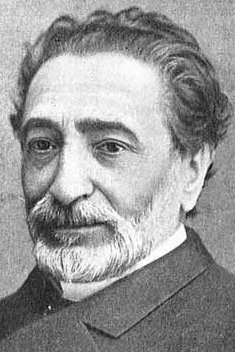

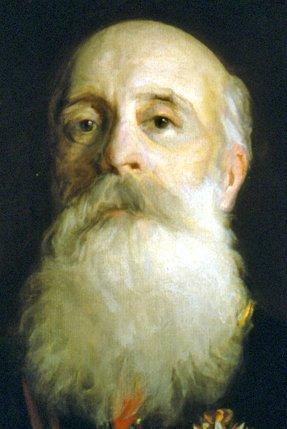
	First party	Second party	Third party
Leader	Antonio Cánovas del Castillo	Práxedes Mateo Sagasta	Manuel Alonso Martínez
Party	Conservative	Liberal Left	Parliamentary Centre
Leader since	1874	1872	1875
Leader's seat	Madrid	Zamora	Castrojeriz
Seats won	288	64	13
Popular vote	402,357	139,314	20,473
Percentage	64.7%	22.4%	3.3%
	Fourth party
Leader	Alejandro Pidal y Mon
Party	Moderate
Leader since	1876
Leader's seat	Villaviciosa
Seats won	11
Popular vote	16,501
Percentage	2.7%
Prime Minister before election
Arsenio Martínez Campos
Conservative
Prime Minister after election
Arsenio Martínez Campos
Conservative

A general election was held in Spain on 20 April 1879 (for the Congress of Deputies), and on 3 May 1879 (for the Senate), to elect the members of the 1st Cortes under the Spanish Constitution of 1876, during the Restoration period. All 431 seats in the Congress of Deputies were up for election, as well as 180 of 360 seats in the Senate.

This was the first election held following the promulgation of the 1876 Constitution and the new electoral law of 1878, which re-established censitary suffrage.

== Background ==
Following the Bourbon Restoration in 1874, the Spanish Constitution of 1876 enshrined Spain as a semi-constitutional monarchy, awarding the monarch—under the royal prerogative—the right of legislative initiative together with the bicameral Cortes; the capacity to veto laws passed by the legislative body; the power to appoint government members (including the prime minister); the ability to grant or deny parliamentary dissolution, the adjournment of legislative sessions and the signature of royal decrees; as well as the title of commander-in-chief of the armed forces. The monarch would play a key role in the turno system by appointing and dismissing governments, which would then organize elections to provide themselves with a parliamentary majority. This informal system allowed the two major "dynastic" political parties at the time, the Conservatives and the Liberals—characterized as oligarchic, elite parties with loose structures dominated by internal factions, each led by powerful individuals—to alternate in power by means of electoral fraud (pucherazo). This was achieved by assigning candidates to districts before the elections were held (encasillado), then arrange their victory through the links between the Ministry of Governance and the territorial clientelistic networks of provincial governors and local bosses (the caciques), excluding minor parties from the power sharing.

== Overview ==
Under the 1876 Constitution, the Spanish Cortes were conceived as "co-legislative bodies", forming a nearly perfect bicameral system. Both the Congress of Deputies and the Senate exercised legislative, oversight and budgetary functions, sharing almost equal powers, except in budget laws (taxation and public credit)—whose first reading corresponded to Congress—and in impeachment processes against government ministers, where Congress handled indictment and the Senate the trial.

=== Date ===
The term of each chamber of the Cortes—the Congress and one-half of the elective part of the Senate—expired five years from the date of their previous election, unless they were dissolved earlier. The previous elections were held on 23 January 1876 for the Congress and on 5 April 1877 for the Senate, which meant that the chambers' terms would have expired on 23 January 1881 and 5 April 1882, respectively.

The monarch had the prerogative to dissolve both chambers at any given time—either jointly or separately—and call a snap election. There was no constitutional requirement for concurrent elections to the Congress and the Senate, nor for the elective part of the Senate to be renewed in its entirety except in the case that a full dissolution was agreed by the monarch. Still, there was only one case of a separate election (for the Senate in 1877) and no half-Senate elections taking place under the 1876 Constitution.

The Cortes were officially dissolved on 10 March 1879, with the corresponding decree setting election day for 20 April (Congress) and 3 May 1881 (Senate) and scheduling for both chambers to reconvene on 1 June.

=== Electoral system ===
Voting for the Congress of Deputies was based on censitary suffrage, comprising Spanish national males over 25 years of age who met either of the following:

- Being taxpayers with a minimum quota of Pts 25 in property taxes (paid one year in advance) or Pts 50 in corporate taxes (paid two years in advance);
- Holding specific positions (such as full academics in the royal academies, cathedral chapter members and parish priests, active public employees with a salary of Pts 2,000, retired public employees, general officers, awarded painters or sculptors, senior court officials and certified teachers);
- Having two years of residence in a Spanish municipality while proving a professional qualification.

In the Spanish West Indies (Cuba and Puerto Rico) the taxpayer requirement was higher (Pts 125, or $25), while former Cuban slaves were barred from voting until three years after becoming freedmen. In the Basque Provinces and Navarre—where taxes were not paid directly—voters had instead to prove wealth equivalent to an income of Pts 4,800; or Pts 2,400 in real estate, crops or livestock. Additional restrictions excluded those deprived of political rights or barred from public office by a final sentence, criminally imprisoned or convicted, legally incapacitated, bankrupt, and public debtors.

The Congress of Deputies had one seat per 50,000 inhabitants. Of these, those corresponding to larger urban areas were elected in multi-member constituencies using partial block voting: voters in constituencies electing eight seats could choose up to six candidates; in those with seven seats, up to five; in those with six seats, up to four; in those with four or five seats, up to three; and in those with three seats, up to two. The remaining seats were elected in single-member districts by plurality voting and distributed among the provinces of Spain according to population. Up to 10 additional members could be elected through cumulative voting if they ran in several single-member districts and obtained over 10,000 votes overall. Cuba and Puerto Rico were allocated 24 and 15 seats, respectively.

As a result of the aforementioned allocation, 320 single-member districts were established, and each Congress multi-member constituency (a total of 31, electing 111 seats) was entitled the following seats:

Seats	Constituencies
8	Havana, Madrid
5	Barcelona, Palma, Santa Clara
4	Santiago de Cuba, Seville
3	Alicante, Almería, Badajoz, Burgos, Cádiz, Cartagena, Córdoba, Granada, Jaén, Jerez de la Frontera, La Coruña, Lugo, Málaga, Matanzas, Murcia, Oviedo, Pamplona, Pinar del Río, Santa Cruz de Tenerife, Santander, Tarragona, Valencia, Valladolid, Zaragoza

Voting for the elective part of the Senate was also based on censitary suffrage, comprising Spanish male householders of voting age, residing in a Spanish municipality, with full political and civil rights, who met either of the following:

- Being qualified electors (such as archbishops, bishops and cathedral chapter members, in the archdioceses; full academics, in the royal academies; university authorities and professors, in the universities; or provincial deputies);
- Being elected as delegates (either by members with three years of seniority (in the economic societies of Friends of the Country; or by major taxpayers for direct taxes and local authorities, in the local councils).

180 Senate seats were elected using indirect, two-round majority voting. Delegates chosen by local councils—each of which was assigned an initial minimum of one delegate, with one additional delegate for every six councillors—voted for senators together with provincial deputies. The provinces of Álava, Albacete, Ávila, Biscay, Canaries, Cuenca, Guadalajara, Guipúzcoa, Huelva, Logroño, Matanzas, Palencia, Pinar del Río, Puerto Príncipe, Santa Clara, Santander, Santiago de Cuba, Segovia, Soria, Teruel and Valladolid were allocated two seats each, and the rest three each, for a total of 147. The remaining 33 seats were allocated to special institutional districts (one each), including major archdioceses, royal academies, universities, and economic societies, (Note: The following were considered as the major districts in each category: Archdioceses: Burgos, Granada, Santiago de Compostela, Santiago de Cuba, Seville, Tarragona, Toledo, Valencia, Valladolid, and Zaragoza.; Royal academies: Spanish; History; Fine Arts of San Fernando; Exact, Physical and Natural Sciences; Moral and Political Sciences; and Medicine.; Universities: Madrid, Barcelona, Granada, Havana, Oviedo, Salamanca, Santiago, Seville, Valencia, Valladolid, and Zaragoza.; Economic societies of Friends of the Country: Madrid, Barcelona, Havana–Puerto Rico, León, Seville, and Valencia.) each elected by their own qualified electors or delegates. Another 180 seats consisted of senators in their own right (such as the monarch's offspring and the heir apparent once coming of age (16), grandees of Spain with an income of Pts 60,000, certain general officers—captain generals and admirals—the Patriarch of the Indies and archbishops, and the heads of higher courts and state institutions (Note: These comprised the Council of State, the Supreme Court, the Court of Auditors and the Supreme Council of War and Navy.) after two years of service), as well as senators for life directly appointed by the monarch.

The law provided for by-elections to fill vacant seats during the legislative term. At least two vacancies were required to trigger a by-election in Congress multi-member constituencies; when only two vacancies were to be filled, voters could choose only one candidate.

== Candidates ==
=== Nomination rules ===
For the Congress, secular Spanish males of voting age, with full civil rights, could run for election. Causes of ineligibility applied to those excluded from voting and to former slaves in Cuba until ten years after becoming freedmen, as well as to:

- Public contractors, within their relevant territories and up to one year after the end of their contracts;
- Holders of a number of territorial posts (such as government-appointed positions, not including Central Administration employees; local and provincial employees; certain technical officials—civil, mining and forest engineers—and presidents of polling stations), within their areas of jurisdiction, during their term of office and up to one year afterwards;
- Holders of any government-appointed post between the election call and election day, for those seeking a seat through cumulative voting.

For the Senate, eligibility was limited to Spanish males over 35 years of age not under criminal prosecution, disfranchisement nor asset seizure, and who either qualified as senators in their own right or belonged (or had belonged) to certain categories:

- Provided an income of Pts 7,500: the presidents of the Senate and the Congress; deputies serving in three different congresses or eight terms; government ministers; bishops; grandees of Spain not eligible as senators in their own right; and various senior officials after two years of service (such as certain general officers—lieutenant generals and vice admirals—and members of higher courts and state institutions); heads of diplomatic missions abroad (ambassadors after two years, and plenipotentiaries after four); heads and full academics in the royal academies; chief engineers; and full professors with four years of service;
- Provided an income of Pts 20,000 or being taxpayers with a minimum quota of Pts 4,000 in direct taxes (paid two years in advance): Spanish nobility; and former deputies, provincial deputies or mayors in provincial capitals or towns over 20,000;
- Having served as senators before the promulgation of the 1876 Constitution.

Other ineligibility provisions for the Senate also applied to a number of territorial officials within their areas of jurisdiction, during their term of office and up to three months afterwards; public contractors; tax collectors; and public debtors.

Incompatibility rules barred representing multiple constituencies simultaneously, as well as combining:

- The role of senator with other legislative roles (deputy, senator and local councillor, except those in Madrid; and provincial deputies within their respective provinces); or with any public post not explicitly permitted under Senate eligibility requirements.
- The role of deputy with any government-appointed post, with exceptions—and as many as 40 deputies allowed to simultaneously benefit from these—including government ministers; and a number of specific posts based in Madrid, such as general officers, chiefs in the Central Administration (provided a public salary of Pts 12,500); senior court officials; university authorities and professors; and chief engineers with two years of service.

== Results ==
=== Congress of Deputies ===
← Summary of the 20 April 1879 Congress of Deputies election results →
Parties and alliances	Popular vote		Seats
Parties and alliances	Votes (Note: In multi-member constituencies, votes have been allocated by calculating the arithmetic average of each candidacy and adding it to the votes of single-member constituencies.)	%	Seats
Liberal Conservative Party (Conservadores)	402,357	64.75	288
Liberal Left Coalition (Izquierda Liberal)	139,314	22.42	64
Constitutional Party (PC)	139,314	22.42	49
Democratic Progressive Party (PPD)	139,314	22.42	9
Democratic Party (PD)	139,314	22.42	6
Parliamentary Centre (Centro Parlamentario)	20,473	3.29	13
Moderate Party (Moderados)	16,501	2.66	11
Ultramontanists (Ultramontanos)	7,965	1.28	7
Fuerist Party of the Basque Union (PFUV)	3,861	0.62	1
Independents (Independientes)	22,729	3.66	6
Other candidates/blank ballots	8,236	1.33	0
Vacants	—	—	2
Total	621,436		392
Votes cast / turnout	621,436	65.28	
Abstentions	330,564	34.72	
Registered voters	952,000		

Popular vote
Conservative	64.75%
Liberal Left	22.42%
Centre	3.29%
Moderate	2.66%
Ultramontanist	1.28%
PFUV	0.62%
Independent	3.66%
Others	1.33%

Seats
Conservative	73.47%
Liberal Left	16.33%
Centre	3.32%
Moderate	2.81%
Ultramontanist	1.79%
PFUV	0.26%
Independent	1.53%

=== Cuba ===
← Summary of the 20 April 1879 Congress of Deputies election results in Cuba →
Parties and alliances	Popular vote		Seats
Parties and alliances	Votes	%	Seats
Constitutional Union Party (Unión Constitucional)			17
Liberal Party (Liberal)			7
Total	17,734		24
Votes cast / turnout	17,734	56.16	
Abstentions	13,844	43.84	
Registered voters	31,578		

Seats
Const. Union	70.33%
Liberal	29.17%

== See also ==
- Encasillado

== Bibliography ==
Legislation

- Ley fijando las excepciones al art. 12 de la electoral vigente, relativo a incompatibilidad del cargo de Diputado a Cortes (PDF) (Law). Madrid Gazette (in Spanish). 1 January 1871.
- Ley mandando que los distritos para las elecciones de Diputados a Cortes sean los que se expresan en la división adjunta (PDF) (Law). Madrid Gazette (in Spanish). 1 January 1871.
- Decreto mandando se verifiquen en Puerto Rico las elecciones ordinarias de Senadores y Diputados a Cortes (PDF) (Decree). Madrid Gazette (in Spanish). 1 April 1871.
- Real decreto dictando reglas sobre incompatibilidades parlamentarias (PDF) (Royal Decree). Madrid Gazette (in Spanish). 11 January 1876.
- Constitución de la Monarquía Española (PDF) (Constitution). Madrid Gazette (in Spanish). 30 June 1876.
- Ley electoral de Senadores (PDF) (Law). Madrid Gazette (in Spanish). 8 February 1877.
- Ley electoral de los Diputados a Cortes (PDF) (Law). Madrid Gazette (in Spanish). 28 December 1878.
- Ley dictando reglas para la elección de Senadores en las islas de Cuba y Puerto Rico (PDF) (Law). Madrid Gazette (in Spanish). 9 January 1879.
- Decreto dividiendo la isla de Cuba en distritos electorales para la elección de Diputados a Cortes (Decree). Havana Gazette (in Spanish). University of Miami. 31 January 1879.
- Real decreto declarando disueltos el Congreso de los Diputados y la parte electiva del Senado y convocando nuevas elecciones (PDF) (Royal Decree). Madrid Gazette (in Spanish). 10 March 1879.

Other

- López Domínguez, José María (1976). Elecciones y partidos políticos de Puerto Rico: 1809-1898 (PDF) (Thesis) (in Spanish). Vol. 1. Puerto Rico: Complutense University of Madrid.
- Calero, Antonio María (1987). "La prerrogativa regia en la Restauración: teoría y práctica (1875-1902)" (PDF). Revista de Estudios Políticos (in Spanish) (55). Madrid: Centre for Political and Constitutional Studies: 273–315. ISSN 0048-7694.
- Ortega Álvarez, Luis; Santaolaya Machetti, Pablo (1996). "Evolución histórica del sistema electoral español". Revista de las Cortes Generales (in Spanish). 37. Cortes Generales: 65–107. doi:10.33426/rcg/1996/37/784. ISSN 0213-0130.
- Martorell Linares, Miguel Ángel (1997). "La crisis parlamentaria de 1913-1917. La quiebra del sistema de relaciones parlamentarias de la Restauración" (PDF). Revista de Estudios Políticos (in Spanish) (96). Madrid: Centre for Political and Constitutional Studies: 137–161. ISSN 0048-7694.
- Roldán de Montaud, Inés (1999). "Política y elecciones en Cuba durante la restauración". Revista de Estudios Políticos (in Spanish) (104): 245–287.
- Caballero Domínguez, Margarita (1999). "El derecho de representación: sufragio y leyes electorales" (PDF). Ayer (in Spanish) (34): 41–63.
- García Muñoz, Montserrat (2002). "La documentación electoral y el fichero histórico de diputados". Revista General de Información y Documentación (in Spanish). 12 (1): 93–137. ISSN 1132-1873.
- Carreras de Odriozola, Albert; Tafunell Sambola, Xavier (2005) [1989]. Estadísticas históricas de España, siglos XIX-XX (PDF) (in Spanish). Vol. 1 (II ed.). Bilbao: Fundación BBVA. pp. 1072–1097. ISBN 84-96515-00-1. Archived from the original (PDF) on 24 September 2015.
- Martínez Relanzón, Alejandro (2017). "Political Modernization in Spain Between 1876 and 1923". Annales Universitatis Mariae Curie-Skłodowska, Sectio K. 24 (1). Madrid: Maria Curie-Skłodowska University: 145–154. doi:10.17951/k.2017.24.1.145.
- Villa García, Roberto (2013). "Elecciones sin Turno: los comicios a diputado de 1879". Historia Contemporánea (in Spanish) (46): 111–142. doi:10.1387/hc.12773. hdl:10810/38196. ISSN 1130-2402.
