= Liberal Left Coalition =

Liberal Left Coalition Coalición de la Izquierda Liberal
- Founded: 2 April 1879
- Dissolved: 1879
- Ideology: Liberalism; Progressivism
- Political position: Centre to centre-left

An electoral alliance of liberal left parties was formed ahead of the 1879 Spanish general election between Práxedes Mateo Sagasta's Constitutional Party (PC), the Democratic Progressive Party (PPD) of Emilio Castelar and Cristino Martos's Democratic Progressive Party (PPD). The alliance was officially launched on 2 April 1879, and would see the fielding of 120 PC candidates, 37 from the PD and 27 from the PPD. The alliance was an electoral failure as it only managed to secure 64 seats, and disbanded shortly thereafter.
