= Maria Flores =

Ibizan abolitionist

- Born: Maria; 1775; Ibiza, Balearic Islands, Spain
- Died: 19th century
- Other names: Maria Meca
- Occupation: Slave
- Known for: Abolitionism

Maria Flores (b. 1775) was an enslaved Ibizan woman who campaigned for her liberation from slavery during the Trienio Liberal.

== Biography ==
Maria was born in 1775, the daughter of the Muslim slave Roc Sentí Martí, and was baptised with only a mononymic first name. Her parents had been captured in Oran and sold into slavery in Ibiza.

In 1785, she was made the slave of the physician Joan Gota-redona Tur, who gave her the surname "Meca". In 1792, Gota-redona died and Maria was made the property of Bernat Guasc Prats. By 1801, she had changed her name to Maria Flores. While enslaved by Guasc, she had three children to an unknown father. Her two sons, Manuel (b. 1798) and Roc (b. 1807), died at a young age. Her daughter, Rita (b. 1805), was also enslaved by Guasc.

By the end of the 18th century, Maria was one of thirteen enslaved people (of which five were women) in Ibiza. At this time, slaves were seen as a status symbol by members of the Ibizan aristocracy. At the beginning of the Trienio Liberal in 1820, the enslaved Ibizan women began campaigning for their freedom, receiving attention from the Spanish press. That year, Maria herself filed a lawsuit against Guasc. On 28 March 1821, the Cortes Generales opened a debate on Maria's case; during the session, she requested that her and her daughter be given police protection. Some in the Cortes argued for the complete abolition of slavery, while others cautioned that it should be done within the bounds of the constitution. Maria argued that Guasc could already consider himself "reimbursed" for her purchase and requested that she herself be reimbursed a salary for 32 years of forced labour.

The liberal Cortes ultimately failed to resolve her case before the restoration of absolute monarchy in 1823. On 24 November 1824, Ferdinand VII of Spain decreed the release of Maria and her daughter from slavery. The word "slave" was struck from her birth certificate by the church. Maria Flores was one of the last people to be enslaved in Ibiza. Slavery in Spain was finally abolished in 1837.

== Legacy ==
The story of Maria Flores was rediscovered by the magazine Estampa in 1928. In the 21st century, the Ibiza City Council named a street after Maria Flores.

== Bibliography ==
- Jurado, Laura (7 February 2023). "La esclava que puso en jaque a la Corona española". elDiario (in Spanish).
- Planells Ripoll, Joan (1991). "Els darrers esclaus d'Eivissa". Eivissa (in Catalan) (19–20): 6–10. ISSN 1130-7803.
- Planells Ripoll, Joan (27 November 2015). "Flores, Maria". Enciclopèdia d'Eivissa i Formentera (in Catalan).
