= Parliamentary Centre =

Parliamentary Centre Centro Parlamentario
- Founded: 1875
- Dissolved: 1880
- Split from: Constitutional Party
- Merged into: Liberal Party
- Political position: Centre

The Parliamentary Centre (Spanish: Centro Parlamentario, CP) was a political group in Spain formed by several times minister Manuel Alonso Martínez as a split from the Constitutional Party. Aligned with Antonio Cánovas del Castillo's Conservative Party from 1876 to 1879, it was later merged into the newly established Liberal Party of Práxedes Mateo Sagasta in 1880.
