= Gaceta de Puerto Rico =

First newspaper published on the island of Puerto Rico

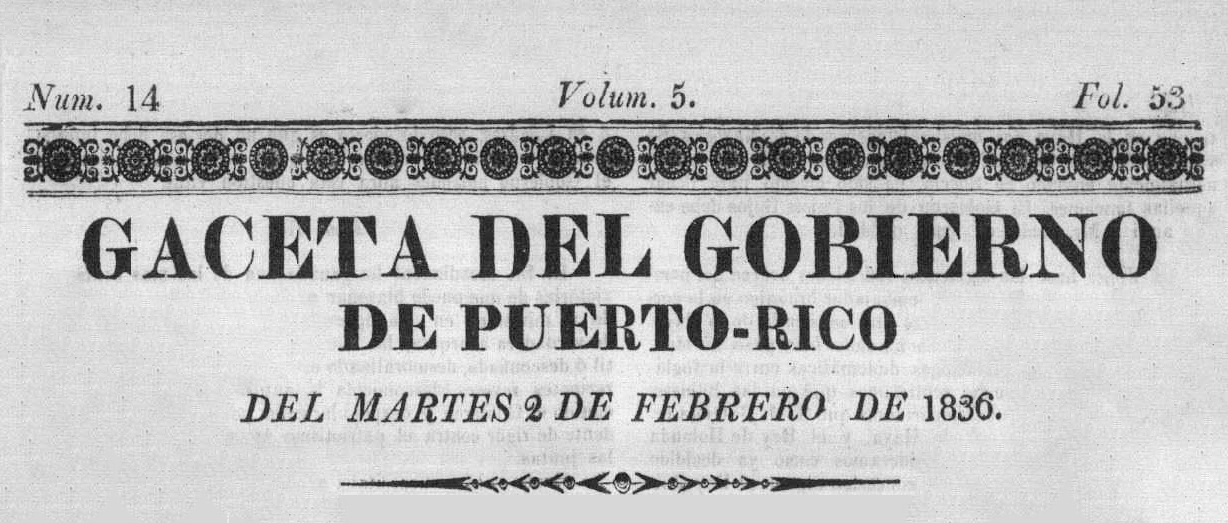

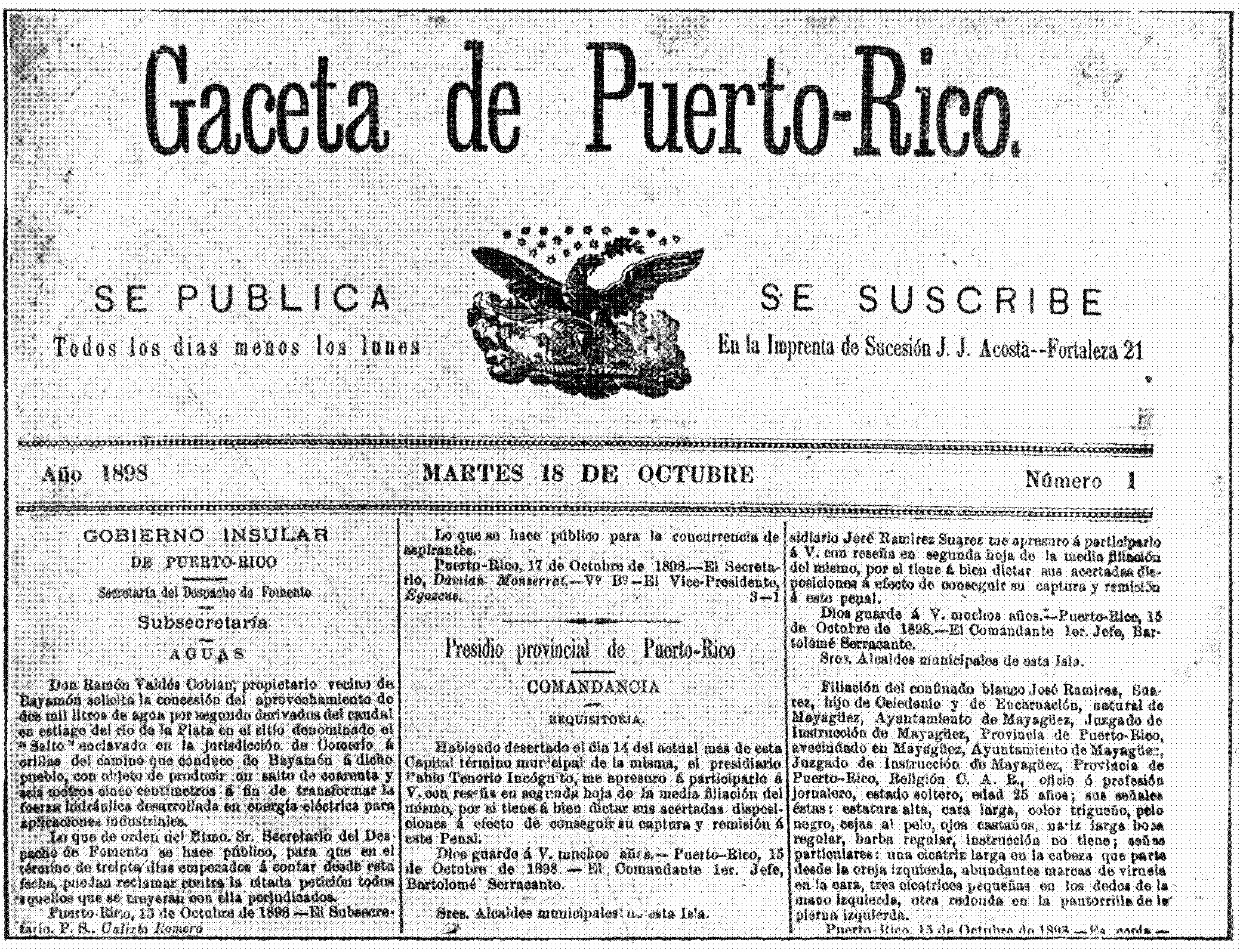
- Gaceta del Gobierno de Puerto-Rico, October 18, 1898
- Launched: July 31, 1807
- Ceased publication: November 30, 1902
- Language: spanish
- City: San Juan
- Country: Puerto Rico

Gaceta de Puerto Rico was the first newspaper published on the island of Puerto Rico. Scholars believe the founding of the Gaceta marks the first instance of a printing press on the island, although printmaking in Latin America dates back to the mid-16th century. Gaceta was an official newspaper of the Spanish government in Puerto Rico and was created in 1807 under the governorship of Toribio Montes.

== Content ==
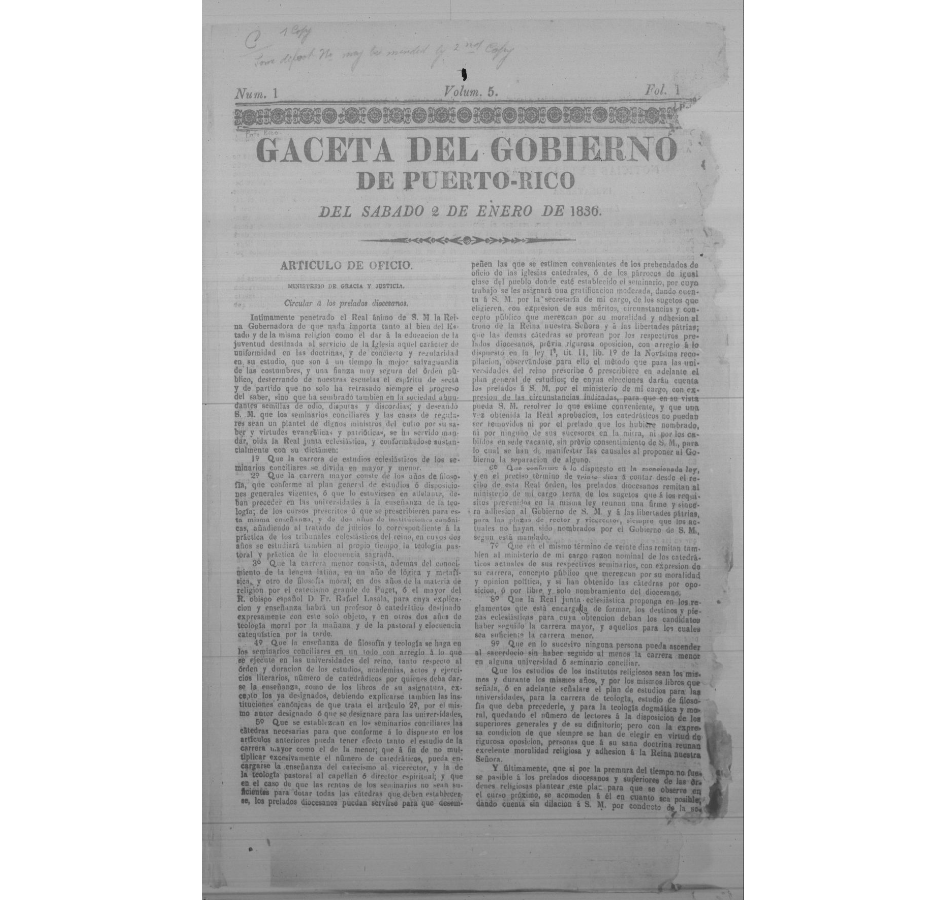
Gaceta full page, an 1836 edition

Gaceta was the primary mode of public information dissemination to the people of Puerto Rico from the Spanish colonial government. It included governmental reports, censuses, political news and royal decrees. In addition to official reportage, the Gaceta also provided general news about life on the island, including arrests, cultural events, arriving ships and other related materials.

== Life ==
When the Gaceta was created in 1807, the issues were four pages long and published on Wednesdays and Saturdays under the name La Gazeta de Puerto-Rico. By the 1820s the publication went by the name Gaceta del Gobierno de Puerto-Rico and was published on Tuesdays, Thursdays and Saturdays. In 1859 the newspaper's title was shortened to Gaceta de Puerto-Rico. It was a daily newspaper from 1897 to 1902.

The United States took control of Puerto Rico from Spain in the aftermath of the Spanish–American War under the terms of the Treaty of Paris of 1898. After that event, the Gaceta continued to operate and published statements from the U.S. military appointed governor John R. Brooke and his administration in both Spanish and English. The Gazette's final issue was published on September 30, 1902.
