= Liberal Reformist Party (Puerto Rico) =

Political party in Puerto Rico

The Liberal Reformist Party (Spanish: Partido Liberal Reformista) was a political party in Puerto Rico founded by Pedro Gerónimo Goyco, José Julián Acosta and Roman Baldorioty de Castro in 1870. It was the first political party ever to be established in Puerto Rico.

The party was formed following the Grito de Lares revolt. Unlike the other party at the time, the Liberal Conservative Party, and which advocated assimilation into the political party system of Spain, the Autonomists—as the Liberal Reformist Party supporters were called—advocated decentralization away from Spanish control.

The party was led by Pedro Gerónimo Goyco (president), José Julián Acosta, José Celis Aguilera, Román Baldorioty de Castro, Julián Blanco, Nicolás Aguayo and Manuel Corchado Juarbe.

== See also ==
- José Manuel García Leduc. Apuntes para una historia breve de Puerto Rico: desde la prehistoria hasta 1898. San Juan, Puerto Rico : Editorial Isla Negra, 2009.
