= Slavery in Spain =

Slavery in Spain began in the 15th century and reached its peak in the 16th century. The history of Spanish enslavement of Africans began with Portuguese captains Antão Gonçalves and Nuno Tristão in 1441. The first large group of African slaves, made up of 235 slaves, came with Lançarote de Freitas three years later. In 1462, Portuguese slave traders began to operate in Seville, Spain. During the 1470s, Spanish merchants began to trade large numbers of slaves. Slaves were auctioned at market at a cathedral, and subsequently were transported to cities all over Imperial Spain. This led to the spread of Moorish, African, and Christian slavery in Spain. By the 16th century, 7.4 percent of the population in Seville, Spain were slaves. Many historians have concluded that Renaissance and early-modern Spain had the highest amount of African slaves in Europe.

Spanish slavery can be traced to the Phoenician and Roman eras. In the 9th century the Muslim Moorish rulers and local Jewish merchants traded in Spanish and Eastern European Christian slaves. After the "discovery" of the "New World", the Spanish colonialists decided to use it for commercial production and mining because of the absence of trading networks. The Native American population was used for this labor but they died in large numbers as a result of war, diseases, exploitation and social disruptions. Meanwhile, the need for labor expanded, such as for the production of sugarcane. The problem of the justness of Indian slavery was a key issue for the Spanish Crown. Bartolomé de las Casas was concerned about the fate of the natives and argued in 1516 that white and black slaves should be imported to the Indies to replace the Amerindians. African slaves did have certain advantages over native slaves as being resistant to European diseases and more familiarity with agricultural techniques. This preference led to the development of the Atlantic Slave Trade.

Charles V, Emperor, abolished the enslavement of natives by decree on November 25, 1542, in his Leyes Nuevas New Laws. This bill was based on the arguments given by the best Spanish theologists and jurists who were unanimous in the condemnation of such slavery as unjust; they declared it illegitimate and outlawed it from America—not just the slavery of Spaniards over Indians—but also the type of slavery practiced among the Indians themselves. The labor system of Encomienda was also abolished in 1550. However these laws did not end the practice of slavery or forced labor immediately and a new system began to be used repartimiento and mita in Peru. Eventually this system too was abolished due to abuses. By the 17th century, forced indigenous labor continued illegally and black slave labor legally.

== Pre-unification ==
Spain consisted of several different nations: different categories of people were enslaved in each, and slavery was conducted under different regulations. Slaves were used for services and employed in various ways such as employment "in domestics, artisans an assistance of all kinds". In the time frame of the Roman times to the Middle Ages, the percentage of the slave population was minimal. "Slaves probably made up less than 1 percent of the population in Spain." "Slavery was cross-cultural and multi-ethnic" and, in addition to that, slavery played an important role in the development of the economy for Spain and other countries.

=== Roman laws ===
The idea that slavery was based on race was and continues to be one of the biggest misconceptions about slavery in Spain. Phillips Jr. William D. in The History of Slavery in Iberia, challenged the idea that race was not the key to determine who was enslaved, but instead religion. Roman laws existed, subjugating slavery which included the sources of slaves, their conditions, and possibility of liberation. In addition, the "normal pattern" was to prohibit people from enslaving someone within their same religion. The Romans made large use of slave gangs for agriculture and other purposes.

=== Visigothic slavery ===
The Visigoths practiced slavery before they came to Iberia, and continued to practice it after arrival, using a system of slavery similar to that of the Romans, with some modifications. Their sources of slaves were similar to those of the Romans, as were their rules for treatment of slaves and manumission. Until their conversion from Aryan Christianity, the Visigoths had no hesitance to enslaving Catholic Christians. A notable difference in their usage is that unlike the Romans, who only used them in the military in support roles, the Visigoths used slaves as active fighting troops.

=== Slavery in al-Andalus ===
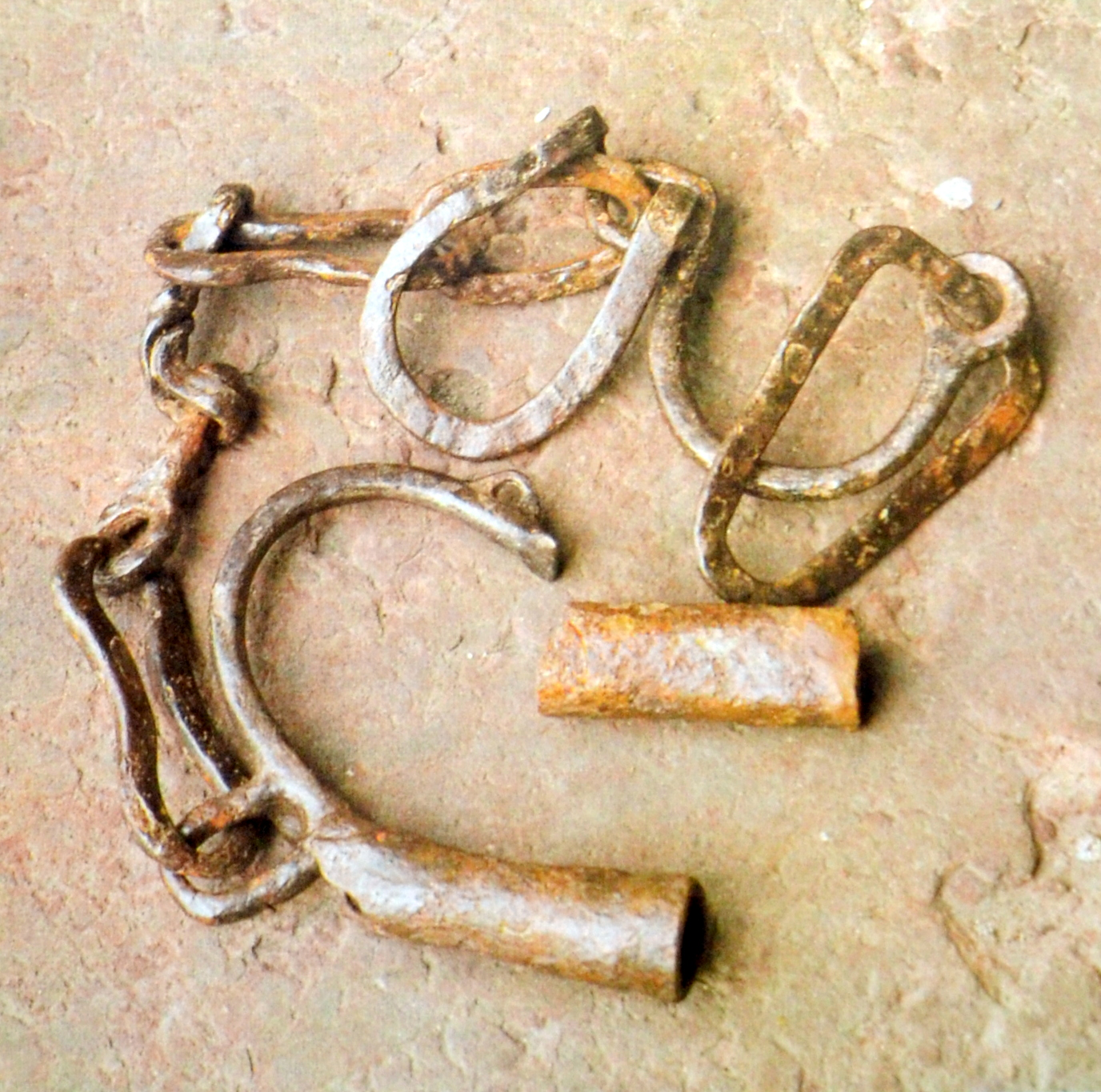
Iron restraints, 11th or 12th century, from Neu Niekohr

During the al-Andalus (also known as Muslim Spain or Islamic Iberia), the Moors controlled much of the peninsula. They imported white Christian slaves from the 8th century until the end of the Reconquista in the late 15th century. The slaves were exported from the Christian section of Spain, as well as Eastern Europe (Saqaliba), sparking significant reaction from many in Christian Spain and many Christians still living in Muslim Spain. The Muslims followed the same technique as Romans to capture slaves; seeking cities to ally with them. Soon after, Muslims were successful, taking 30,000 Christian captives from Spain. In the eighth century slavery lasted longer due to “frequent cross-border skirmishes, interspersed between periods of major campaigns.” By the tenth century, Byzantine Christians in the eastern Mediterranean were captured by Muslims. Many of the raids designed by Muslims were created for the fast capture of prisoners. Therefore, Muslims restricted control in order to keep captives from fleeing. The Iberian peninsula served as a base for further exports of slaves into other Muslim regions in Northern Africa.

At the time of the formation of al-Andalus, Mozarabs and Jews were allowed to remain and retain their slaves if they paid a head tax for themselves and half-value for the slaves. However, non-Muslims were prohibited from holding Muslim slaves, and so if one of their slaves converted to Islam, they were required to sell the slave to a Muslim. Mozarabs were later, by the 9th and 10th centuries, permitted to purchase new non-Muslim slaves via the peninsula's established slave trade.

The saqaliba slavery during the Caliphate of Cordoba is the perhaps most well known in al-Andalus. The slaves of the Caliph were often European saqaliba slaves trafficked from Northern or Eastern Europe. Male saqaliba could be given work in a number of tasks, such as offices in the kitchen, falconry, mint, textile workshops, the administration or the royal guard (in the case of harem guards, they were castrated), while female saqaliba were placed in the harem.

The harem could contain thousands of slave concubines; the harem of Abd al-Rahman I consisted of 6,300 women. The concubines (jawaris) were educated in accomplishments to please their master, and many became known and respected for their knowledge in a variety of subjects from music to medicine. A concubine who gave birth to a child attained the status of an umm walad, which meant that they could no longer be sold and were to be set free after the death of their master.

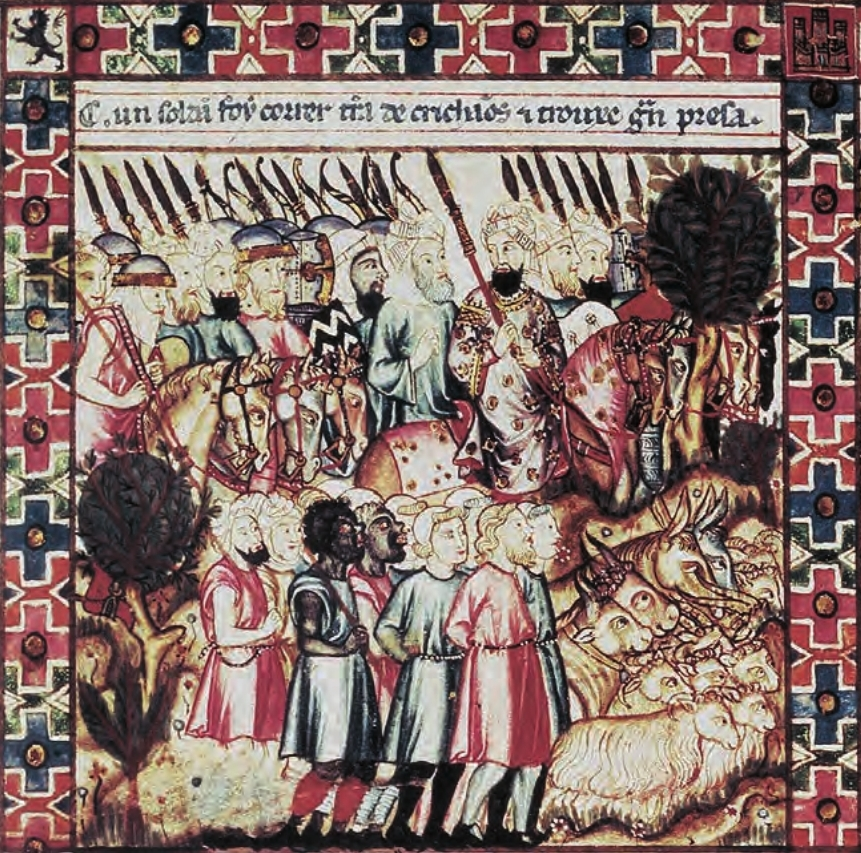
The slave market of Cordoba by the Cantigas de Santa Maria

=== Slavery in Christian Iberia ===
In the Christian kingdoms of northern Iberia, slavery existed as well, originally as a continuation of Visigothic practices. Though enslavement of Christians was originally permitted, over the period from the 8th to the 11th centuries the Christian kingdoms gradually ceased this practice, limiting their pool of slaves to Muslims from al-Andalus. Unlike the routine use of large slave gangs under the Romans, slavery in the medieval north mostly provided supplements to the workforce of free laborers and temporary labor for special projects. Male slaves also might be servants or agents, while female slaves often were domestics and concubines.

With the phasing out of Christian slavery, the Christian kingdoms passed through a period where most slaves would come from military campaigns in the Muslim south. In the western kingdom of Castile, this remained the dominant pattern throughout the Middle Ages. The pool of slaves was only expanded in the second half of the 15th century when the Castilians and Portuguese began their nautical probes down the Atlantic coast of Africa, through which sub-Saharan African slaves were first introduced in larger numbers into Europe.

In eastern Iberia, in Aragon with its coastal centers of Barcelona and Valencia, slavery evolved in the later Middle Ages. Rather than acquire their slaves primarily by war in Iberia, they instead joined in a burgeoning common slave market of the Christian Western Mediterranean, with the slaves largely taken in military campaigns by the Italian states against the peoples of the eastern and southern shores of the Mediterranean, as well as north of the Black Sea. The imported slaves were non-Christian, or at least non-Catholic, and mostly females who would serve as domestics, referred to as ancillae, and sometimes concubines, within the households of the growing urban centers of eastern Iberia. They were encouraged to convert, and were more frequently manumitted than in the western states. Aragon also supplied tens of thousands of slaves to these slave markets following their conquests of Muslim Majorca and Minorca.

Christian states prohibited their Jewish and Mudéjar residents from owning Christian slaves. As an unintended consequence, this increased the Muslim slave-owners' resistance to assimilation, their faith being reinforced by exposure to slaves from countries where Islam was dominant.

== Post-unification Spain ==
After dynastic union of the Crown of Castile and the Crown of Aragon in 1479 under Catholic Monarchs, and with its formal establishment in 1492, Spain was united and slavery was performed under the same rules in all Spain.

=== Enslavement of Africans ===
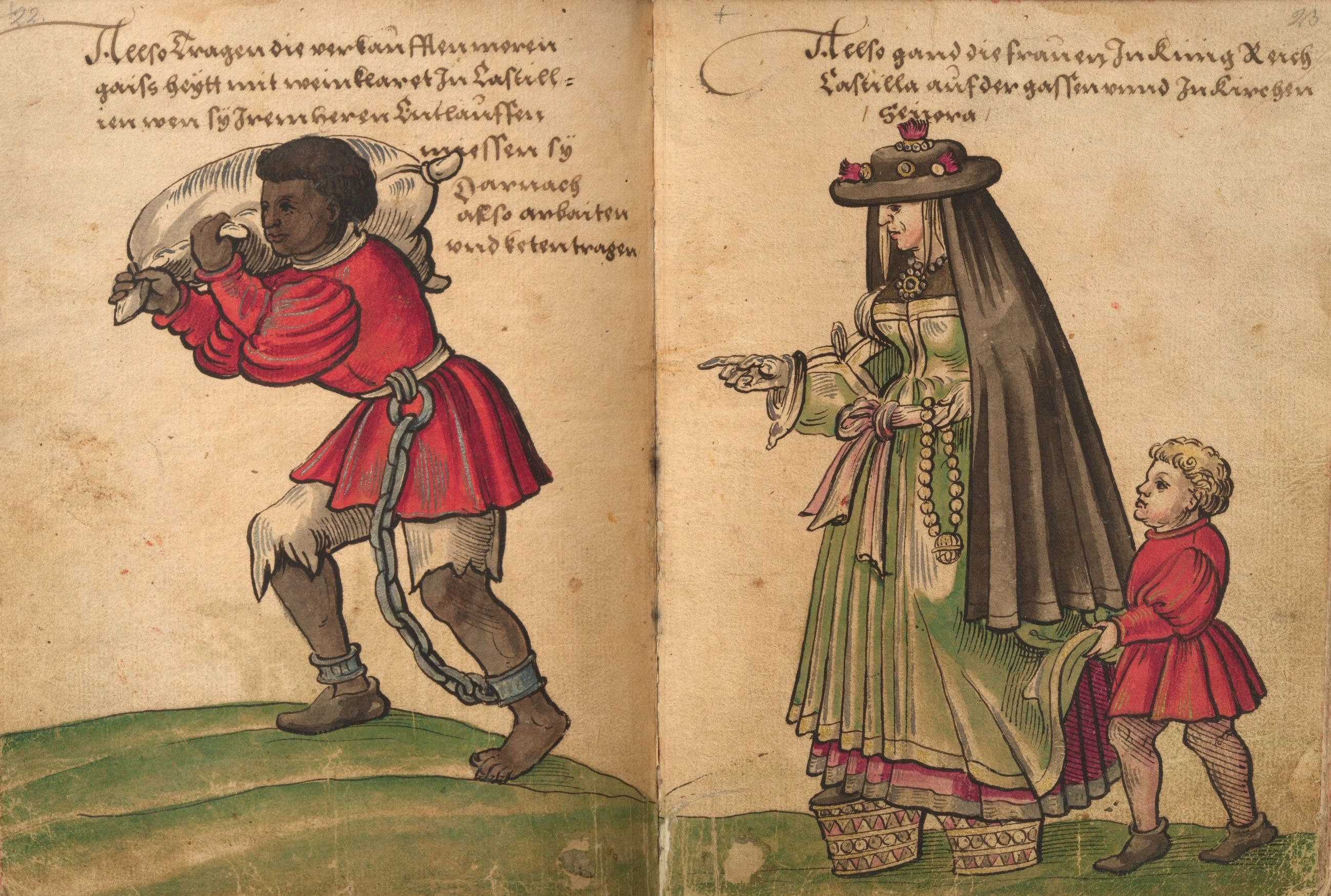
Depiction of a slave man in Castile, by Christoph Weiditz in The Costume Codex (1530–1540)

In 1442, Pope Eugene IV gave the Portuguese the right to explore Sub-Saharan Africa. The Portuguese attempted to protect their findings from the Spanish, who were beginning to explore Africa contemporaneously. At that time, Spain was occupied by a Muslim power and the Catholic Church felt threatened. Protecting the church, Pope Nicholas V in 1452 gave the right to enslave anyone who was not practicing the Christian religion, known as the Dum Diversas. The Spanish government created the Asiento system, which functioned between the years of 1543 and 1834. The Asiento allowed other countries to sell people into slavery to the Spanish. A population by the late 16th century was mostly composed of individuals of African descent. Antumi Toasijé states in the Journal of Black Studies, "African peoples have an ancient presence in the Iberian Peninsula. In fact, Spanish identity especially has been forged on the frontlines of African and European interaction."

=== Enslavement of Indigenous Americans ===
In February 1495, Christopher Columbus took captive over 1,500 Arawaks. About 550 of them were shipped to Spain as slaves, with about 40% dying en route.

=== Enslavement of Moors ===
The Moors often served as slaves in Christian Spain. These slaves were captured from Spain and North Africa and imported into the Christian section of the Iberian peninsula. During the Expulsion of the Moriscos (Muslims who had been forced to convert to Christianity), thousands voluntarily gave themselves up in slavery rather than comply with the eviction order. Spain's Moorish slave population was progressively freed in the early 18th century as the institution went into decline.

=== Treatment of slaves ===
The treatment of slaves in Spain was thought to be less harsh compared to other parts where slaves were held captive. Individual slaves could over the time rise to a certain stature that could allow them to become free. However, the treatment of slaves differed with each slave owner, even though some laws protected slaves. The slave owners’ control was dependent on the notion that slaves would be harmful to their interests if they had more rights. It was also important to Spanish slave-owners that their slaves adopt Spanish names and accept Christianity as their religion. Spanish slaves who converted to Christianity were often treated less harshly, and had better opportunities to gain freedom. As Christianity was the dominant faith in Spain, it was considered respectful for slaves to adopt this religion as their own and abandon their former religious beliefs. A willingness to comply with this conversion led to better treatment and a closer relationship between slaves and their owners. It also gave them a better chance of being accepted into Spanish society following their freedom.

=== Slavery in colonial Spanish America ===
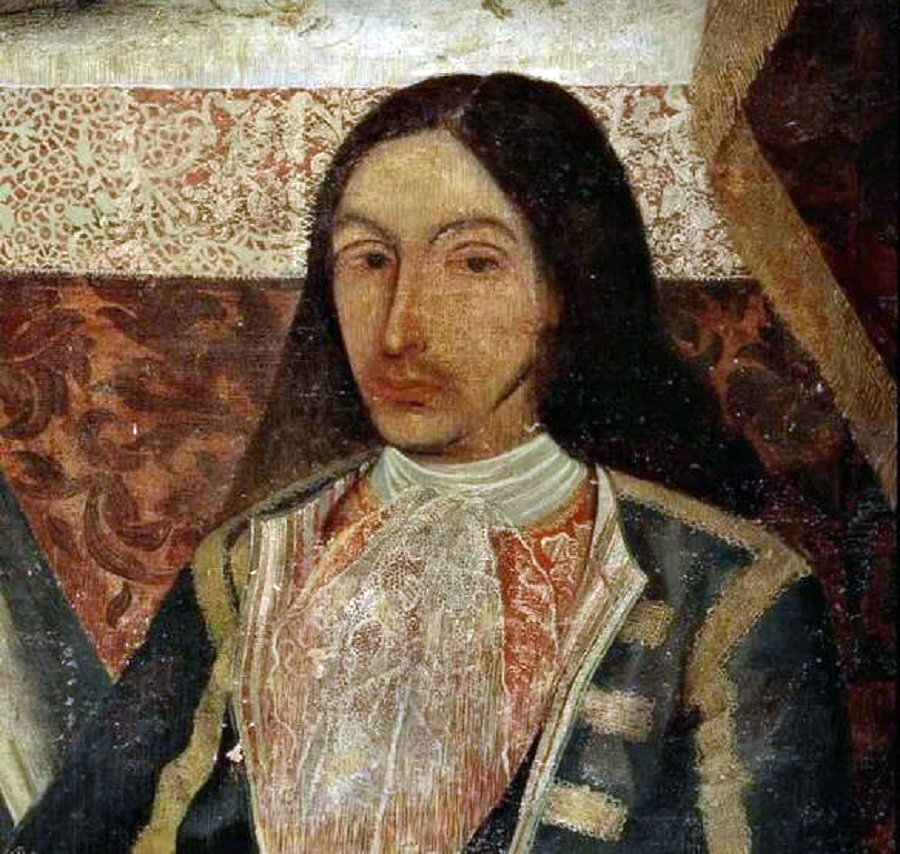
The Spanish Amaro Pargo, who was one of the most famous privateers of the Golden Age of Piracy, participated in the African slave trade in Hispanic America.

This slave trade was carried out mainly by Spanish merchants as labor for sugar plantations and for domestic service in the American lands, especially in the Caribbean area.

The Spanish privateer and merchant Amaro Pargo (1678–1747) managed to transport slaves to the Caribbean, although, it is estimated, to a lesser extent than other captains and figures of the time dedicated to this activity. In 1710, the privateer was involved in a complaint by the priest Alonso García Ximénez, who accused him of freeing an African slave named Sebastián, who was transported to Venezuela on one of Amaro's ships. The aforementioned Alonso García granted a power of attorney on July 18, 1715, to Teodoro Garcés de Salazar so that he could demand his return in Caracas. Despite this fact, Amaro Pargo himself also owned slaves in his domestic service.

Slavery in Cuba remained legal until abolished by royal decree in 1886.

== See also ==
- Atlantic slave trade
- Slavery in colonial Spanish America
  - Slavery in New Spain
- Slavery in the colonial United States
- Slavery among Native Americans in the United States
- History of Spanish slavery in the Philippines
- Contemporary slavery
- History of slavery
- Indentured servitude
- Indentured servitude in the Americas
- Debt bondage
- Human trafficking
- Maria Flores
