= Radical Democratic Party (Spain) =

Radical Democratic Party Partido Demócrata Radical
- Founded: 1871; 154 years ago
- Dissolved: 1880; 145 years ago
- Split from: Progressive Party
- Succeeded by: Centralist Republican Party; Progressive Republican Party; Liberal Party
- Ideology: Republicanism; Progressivism; Liberalism (Spanish)
- Political position: Left-wing

The Radical Democratic Party (Spanish: Partido Demócrata Radical, PDR), later known as the Republican Reformist Party (Spanish: Partido Reformista Republicano, PRR), was one of the Spanish political parties that contended for power during the reign of Amadeo I (reigned 1870–73) and the First Spanish Republic (1873–74), opposing the Constitutional Party.

== Background ==
The party was established in 1871, after the division of the Progressive Party following the death of General Juan Prim, 1st Marquis of los Castillejos. The left wing of the party, along with the cimbrios, monarchist faction of the Democratic Party led by Cristino Martos, organised themselves as a party under the leadership of Manuel Ruiz Zorrilla.

The party disintegrated after the 1874 restoration of the monarchy, fleeing its members to left-wing monarchist parties or to republican parties. Ruiz Zorrilla and his supporters established the Progressive Republican Party, while the faction of Martos joined the Liberal Party of Práxedes Mateo Sagasta. In 1876, the party remnants were reorganized as the Republican Reformist Party by Nicolás Salmerón.
