= Constitutional Party (Spain) =

Constitutional Party Partido Constitucional
- Founded: 1872; 154 years ago
- Dissolved: 1880; 146 years ago
- Preceded by: Progressive Party
- Succeeded by: Liberal Party
- Ideology: Liberalism; Constitutionalism; Internal factions: • Conservatism • Progressivism
- Political position: Centre

The Constitutional Party (Spanish: Partido Constitucional), originally Conservative Democratic Party (Spanish: Partido Conservador-Democrático), was one of the Spanish political parties that contended for power during the reign of Amadeo I (reigned 1870–1873) and the First Spanish Republic (1873-1874), opposing the Radical Democratic Party.

The party was established in 1871, after the division of the Progressive Party following the death of General Juan Prim, 1st Marquis of los Castillejos. The right wing of the party, along with some members of the Liberal Union organised themselves as a party under the leadership of General Francisco Serrano, 1st Duke of la Torre and Práxedes Mateo Sagasta. The Bloc, being called "Democratic Conservatives" (Spanish: Conservadurismo Democrático) opposed to the "Democratic Radicals" of Ruiz Zorrilla during the campaign of the election of April 1872, was a coalition of pro-Serrano Liberal Union and pro-Sagasta Progressive Party, as the two parties weren't formally dissolved at the point.

The constitutionalists split up in two groups after the 1874 restoration of the monarchy. The right faction of the party, led by Manuel Alonso Martínez, accepted the new King Alfonso XII and the new Constitution, and joined the Conservative Party of Antonio Cánovas del Castillo, a member of the Liberal Union who wasn't fond of the Conservative Coalition of 1872. The rest of the party, headed by Sagasta, remained faithful to the Constitution of 1869 until 1880, when they finally accepted the new one and the turno system, establishing the Liberal Party, which contended for power opposing the Conservative Party.
