= Old main synagogue, Segovia =

Historic former synagogue and current church, in Segovia, Spain

Old Main Synagogue
- Spanish: Antigua Sinagoga Mayor
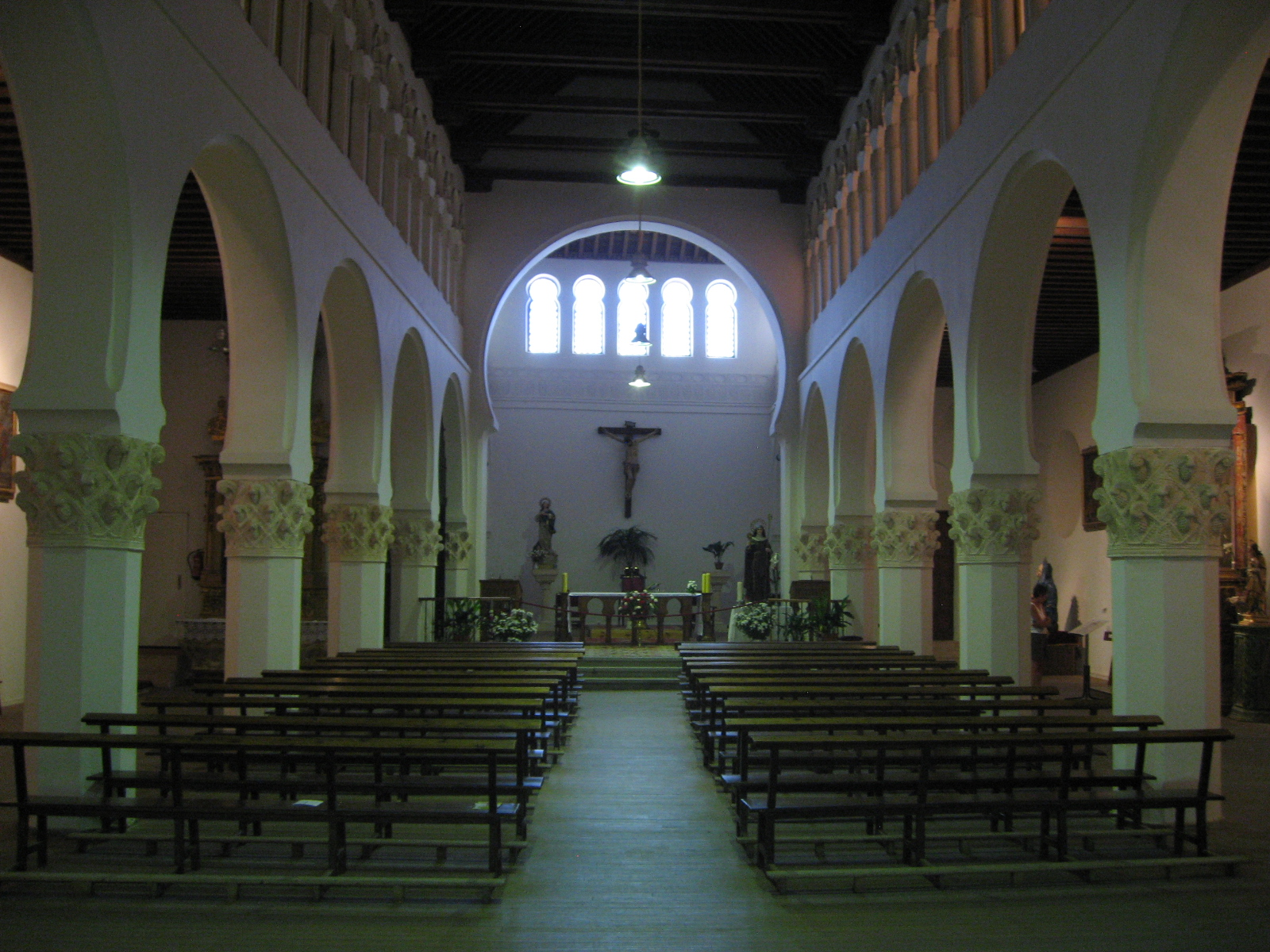
- The former synagogue interior, now a church, in 2008

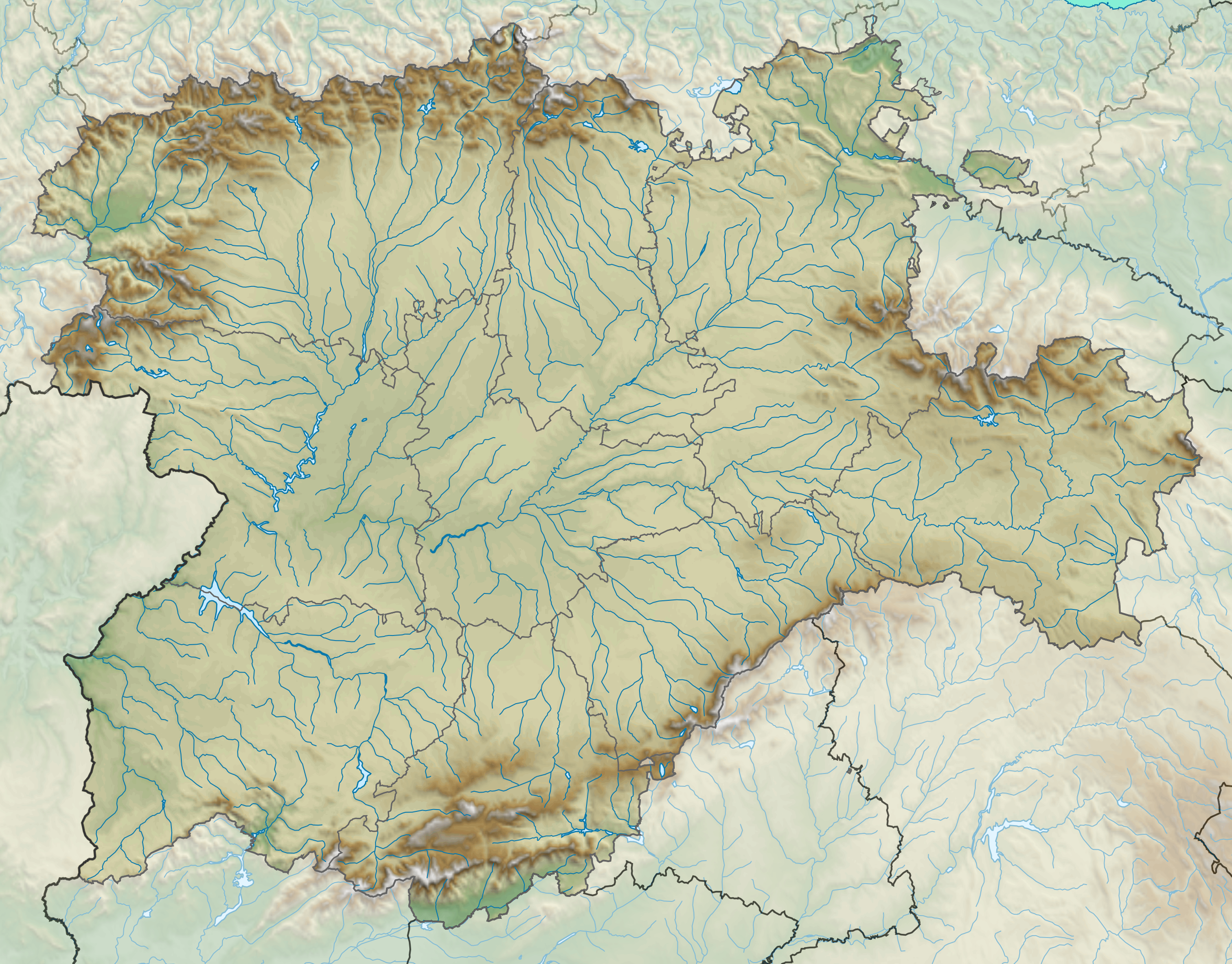
- Location of the former synagogue, now church, in Castile and León

Religion
- Affiliation: Judaism (former); Roman Catholicism
- Rite: Nusach Sefard
- Ecclesiastical or organizational status: Synagogue (c. 1373–1410); Church (since 1419)
- Status: Abandoned (as a synagogue); Repurposed

Location
- Location: 7 Plaza del Corpus, Segovia, Province of Segovia, Castile and León
- Country: Spain
- Interactive map of Old Main Synagogue
- Coordinates: 40°56′58″N 4°07′25″W

Architecture
- Type: Synagogue architecture
- Style: Mudéjar
- Completed: c. 1373 (as a synagogue); 2004 (restored church)
- Destroyed: 1899 (by fire, subsequently restored)
- Materials: Brick

The Old Main Synagogue (Spanish: Antigua Sinagoga Mayor) is a former Jewish congregation and synagogue, located at 7 Plaza del Corpus, in the former Jewish quarter of Segovia, in the province of Segovia, in Castile and León, Spain. The medieval building was used as a synagogue from c. 1373 until 1410; as a Catholic church, called the Church of Corpus Christi, attached to a convent of the nuns of Order of Saint Clare from 1419; almost completely destroyed in a fire in 1899; and was subsequently restored as a church.

== History ==
The construction of the old main synagogue took place around mid-14th century. Beginning in the 15th century, it was confiscated by the authorities and converted into a church in 1419, dedicated to Corpus Christi. In 1421, the bishop of Segovia handed the building and premises over to the Monastery of Santa María de Párraces. The monastery in turn sold it to two brothers, Manuel and Antonio del Sello, who transformed it into a convent for the Sisters of Penitence. The former synagogue still forms part of that convent.

== Architecture ==
The entrance to the synagogue is not directly from the street, but through a courtyard. Its 14th-century prayer room is rectangular, to which was later added, when converted to a church, the main altar and the choir area, divided into three naves by two rows of five horseshoe arches each, in the Mudéjar style. The pillars supporting these arches are octagonal in shape and have large capitals featuring vegetal decoration. Above each of the two arcades ran a smaller arcade connecting the two big arches from the ground with the top of the central nave. In 1899 a fire completely destroyed the building.

Its present appearance is a result of restoration work that took place starting in 1902 and the last one in 2004, when the original plasterwork of the capitals was restored. The reconstruction was possible since small fragments of the original capitals were discovered, which made the reproduction possible. Opposite the entrance hangs a painting by Vicente Cutanda called Miracle in the synagogue (Milagro en la sinagoga), painted in 1902.

== Gallery ==
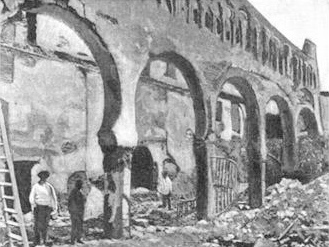
The former synagogue and church after it was destroyed in the fire of 1899

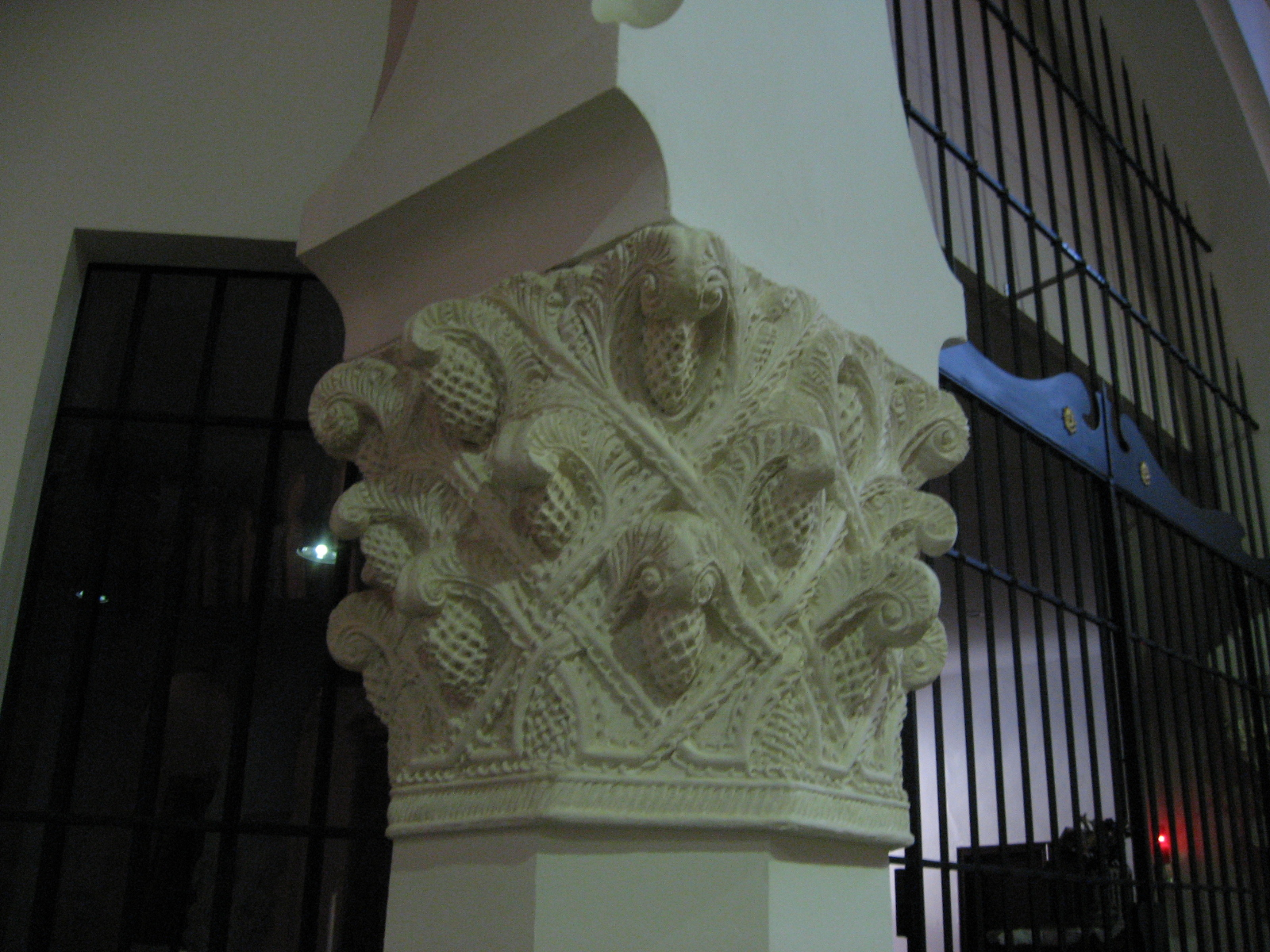
A capital with vegetation motifs were restored in the very late 20th century

== See also ==
- History of the Jews in Spain
- List of synagogues in Spain
