= History of the Jews in Spain =

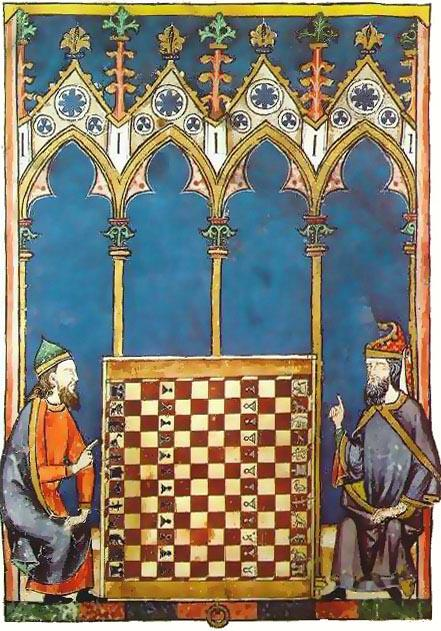
13th-century illustration from the Libro de los juegos depicting Jews playing chess.

The history of the Jews in the current-day Spanish territory stretches back to Biblical times according to Jewish tradition, but the settlement of organised Jewish communities in the Iberian Peninsula possibly traces back to the times after the destruction of the Second Temple in 70 CE. The earliest archaeological evidence of Hebrew presence in Iberia consists of a 2nd-century gravestone found in Mérida. From the late 6th century onward, following the Visigothic monarchs' conversion from Arianism to the Nicene Creed, conditions for Jews in Iberia considerably worsened.

After the Umayyad conquest of Hispania in the early 8th century, Jews lived under the Dhimmi system and progressively Arabised. Jews of Al-Andalus stood out particularly during the 10th and the 11th centuries, in the caliphal and first taifa periods. Scientific and philological study of the Hebrew Bible began, and secular poetry was written in Hebrew for the first time. After the Almoravid and Almohad invasions, many Jews fled to Northern Africa and the Christian Iberian kingdoms. Targets of antisemitic mob violence, Jews living in the Christian kingdoms faced persecution throughout the 14th century, leading to the 1391 pogroms. As a result of the Alhambra Decree of 1492, the remaining practising Jews in Castile and Aragon were forced to convert to Catholicism (thus becoming 'New Christians' who faced discrimination under the limpieza de sangre system) whereas those who continued to practise Judaism (c. 100,000–200,000) were expelled, creating diaspora communities. Tracing back to a 1924 decree, there have been initiatives to favour the return of Sephardi Jews to Spain by facilitating Spanish citizenship on the basis of demonstrated ancestry.

An estimated 40,000 to 50,000 Jews live in Spain today.

== Early history ==
The earliest significant Jewish presence in the Iberian Peninsula is generally traced back to the first centuries CE, when the region, known to the Romans as Hispania, was part of the Roman Empire. This presence is supported by both archaeological finds and literary sources.

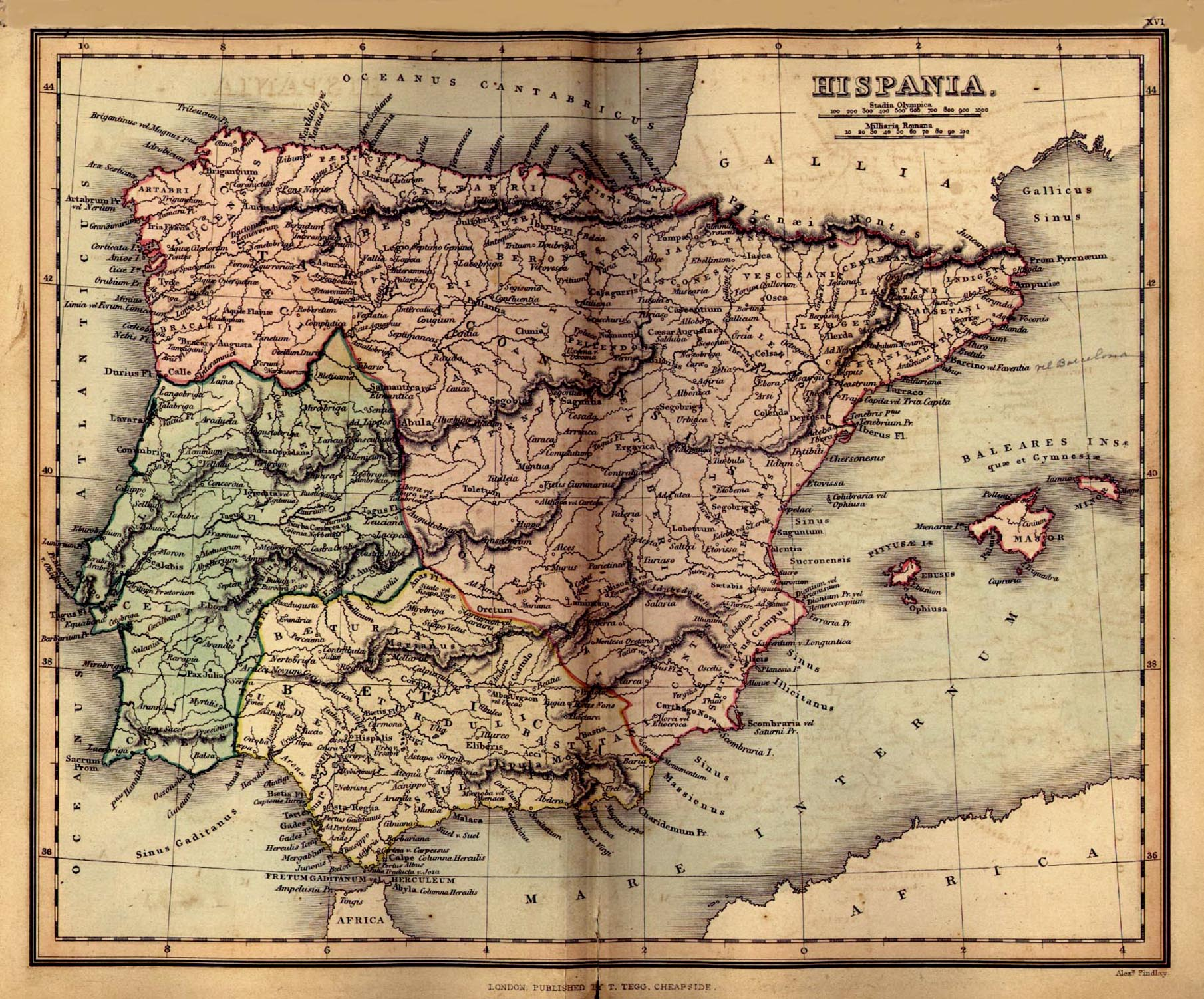
Roman provinces of Hispania

Among the early artifacts of likely Jewish origin discovered in Spain is an amphora from the first century CE, discovered in Ibiza, part of the Balearic Islands. The vessel bears two Hebrew characters, suggesting Jewish contact with the region, likely through trade between Judaea and the Balearics. Additionally, a signet ring from Cádiz, dating to the 8th–7th century BCE, features an inscription generally considered Phoenician, though some scholars interpret it as "paleo-Hebraic," possibly indicating a Jewish presence in biblical times. Two trilingual Jewish inscriptions from Tarragona and Tortosa, dated between the 2nd century BCE and the 6th century CE, further support evidence of early Jewish settlements. A tombstone from Adra (formerly Abdera), inscribed with the name of a Jewish infant, Annia Salomonula, dates to the 3rd century CE. Roughly from the same era, a tombstone inscription from Villamesías commemorates a freedman named Alucius Roscius, who defines himself as Jewish; the epitaph is loosely dated between the 1st and 3rd centuries CE.

One of the earliest references possibly indicating a Jewish presence in Roman-era Spain is Paul the Apostle's Epistle to the Romans. Paul's stated intention to travel to Spain to preach the gospel has been interpreted by many as evidence of established Jewish communities in the region during the mid-first century CE. Flavius Josephus, in The Jewish War, records that Herod Antipas, son of Herod the Great and tetrarch of Galilee and Perea, was exiled by Emperor Caligula to Spain in 39 CE. However, in his later work, Antiquities of the Jews, Josephus identifies the location of Antipas's banishment as Gaul.

Rabbinic literature from references Spain as a distant land with a Jewish presence. The Mishnah, redacted around 200 CE, implied that there was a Jewish community in Spain, and that there was communication with the Jewish community in the Land of Israel. A tradition passed down by Rabbi Berekhiah and Rabbi Shimon bar Yochai, quoting second-century tanna Rabbi Meir, states: "Do not fear, O Israel, for I help you from remote lands, and your seed from the land of their captivity, from Gaul, from Spain, and from their neighbors." From a slightly later period, Midrash Rabbah (Leviticus Rabba § 29.2), and Pesikta de-Rav Kahana (Rosh Hashanna), both, make mention of the Jewish diaspora in Spain (Hispania) and their eventual return. Among these early references are several decrees of the Council of Elvira, convened in the early fourth century, which address proper Christian behaviour with regard to the Jews of Spain, notably forbidding marriage between Jews and Christians.

Thus, while there are limited material and literary indications for Jewish contact with Spain from a very early period, more definitive and substantial data begins with the third century. Data from this period suggest a well-established community, whose foundations must have been laid sometime earlier. Some suggest that substantial Jewish immigration probably occurred during the Roman period of Hispania. The province came under Roman control with the fall of Carthage after the Second Punic War (218–202 BC). It is likely that these communities originated several generations earlier in the aftermath of the conquest of Judea, and possible that they originated much earlier. It is within the realm of possibility that they went there under the Romans as free men to take advantage of its rich resources and build enterprises there. These early arrivals would have been joined by those who had been enslaved by the Romans under Vespasian and Titus, and dispersed to the extreme west during the period of the Jewish-Roman War, and especially after the defeat of Judea in 70. One questionable estimate places the number carried off to Spain at 80,000. Subsequent immigrations came into the area along both the northern African and southern European sides of the Mediterranean.

As citizens of the Roman Empire, the Jews of Spain engaged in a variety of occupations, including agriculture. Until the adoption of Christianity, Jews had close relations with non-Jewish populations, and played an active role in the social and economic life of the province. The edicts of the Synod of Elvira, although early examples of priesthood-inspired antisemitism, provide evidence of Jews who were integrated enough into the greater community to cause alarm among some: of the council's 80 canonic decisions, all those that pertained to Jews served to maintain a separation between the two communities. It seems that by this time the presence of Jews was of greater concern to Catholic authorities than the presence of pagans; Canon 16, which prohibited marriage with Jews, was worded more strongly than canon 15, which prohibited marriage with pagans. Canon 78 threatens those who commit adultery with Jews with ostracism. Canon 48 forbade Jews from blessing Christian crops, and Canon 50 forbade sharing meals with Jews; repeating the command to Hebrew the Bible indicated respect to Gentile.

Although the spread of Jews into Europe is most commonly associated with the Diaspora that ensued from the Roman conquest of Judea, emigration from Judea into the greater Roman Mediterranean area antedated the destruction of Jerusalem at the hands of the Romans under Titus. Any Jews already in Hispania at this time would have been joined by those who had been enslaved by the Romans under Vespasian and Titus, and dispersed to the extreme west during the period of the Jewish Wars, and especially after the defeat of Judea in 70. One account placed the number carried off to Hispania at 80,000. Subsequent immigrations came into the area along both the northern African and southern European sides of the Mediterranean.

As citizens of the Roman Empire, the Jews of Hispania engaged in a variety of occupations, including agriculture. Until the adoption of Christianity, Jews had close relations with non-Jewish populations and played an active role in the social and economic life of the province.

Around 300 CE, the Synod of Elvira, an ecclesiastical council held in the Roman province of Hispania Baetica, addressed the interactions between Christians and Jews, which were relatively common at the time, with some Christians even admiring Jewish practices. To mitigate Jewish influence on Christian society, the council enacted several edicts aimed at reinforcing separation between the two groups. Canon 16 prohibited intermarriage between Christians and Jews, Canon 78 imposed penalties on Christians committing adultery with Jewish women, Canon 48 forbade Jews from blessing Christian crops, and Canon 50 prohibited shared meals between Christians and Jews.

Severus of Minorca's Letter on the Conversion of the Jews, from the 5th century, recounts the alleged conversion of Menorca's Jewish population in 418. Following the arrival of Saint Stephen's relics in Magona, Severus launched a campaign against the local Jews. Fearing violence and inspired by the Maccabees, the Jews stockpiled weapons. Severus mobilized Christians, accused Jewish leaders of plotting, and inspected the synagogue's weapons. This led to a riot, with Christians seizing and burning the synagogue. Within a week, all 540 local Jews were converted by force.

In comparison to Jewish life in Byzantium and Italy, life for the early Jews in Hispania and the rest of southern Europe was relatively tolerable. This is due in large measure to the difficulty the Church had in establishing itself in its western frontier. In the west, Germanic tribes such as the Suevi, the Vandals, and especially the Visigoths had more or less disrupted the political and ecclesiastical systems of the Roman empire, and for several centuries the Jews enjoyed a degree of peace their brethren to the east did not.

== In Jewish tradition ==
Medieval Jewish legends often traced the arrival of Jews in Spain to the First Temple period. One such legend from the 16th century claimed that a funeral inscription in Murviedro belonged to Adoniram, a commander of King Solomon, who had supposedly died in Spain while collecting tribute. Another legend spoke of a letter allegedly sent by the Jews of Toledo to Judaea in 30 CE, asking to prevent the crucifixion of Jesus. These legends aimed to establish that Jews had settled in Spain well before the Roman period and to absolve them of any responsibility for the death of Jesus, a charge often leveled at them in later centuries.

Several early Jewish writers wrote that their families had lived in Spain since the destruction of the first temple. Isaac Abravanel (1437–1508) stated that the Abravanel family had lived on the Iberian Peninsula for 2,000 years.

=== Identification of Spain with biblical Sepharad ===
The earliest mention of Sepharad is, allegedly, found in Obadiah 1:20:

"And the exiles of this host of the sons of Israel who are among the Canaanites as far as Ṣarfat (Heb. צרפת), and the exiles of Jerusalem who are in Sepharad, will possess the cities of the south."

While the medieval lexicographer, David ben Abraham al-Fasi, identifies Ṣarfat with the city of Ṣarfend (Ladino: צרפנדה), the word Sepharad (Hebrew: ספרד) in the same verse has been translated by the 1st century rabbinic scholar, Jonathan ben Uzziel, as Aspamia. Based on a later teaching in the compendium of Jewish oral laws compiled by Judah ha-Nasi in 189 CE, known as the Mishnah, Aspamia is associated with a very faraway place, generally thought of as Hispania, or Spain. Circa 960, Hisdai ibn Shaprut, minister of trade in the court of the caliph in Córdoba, wrote to Joseph the king of Khazaria, saying: "The name of our land in which we dwell is called in the sacred tongue, Sepharad, but in the language of the Arabs, the indwellers of the lands, Alandalus [Andalusia], the name of the capital of the kingdom, Córdoba."

=== Connection with biblical Tarshish ===
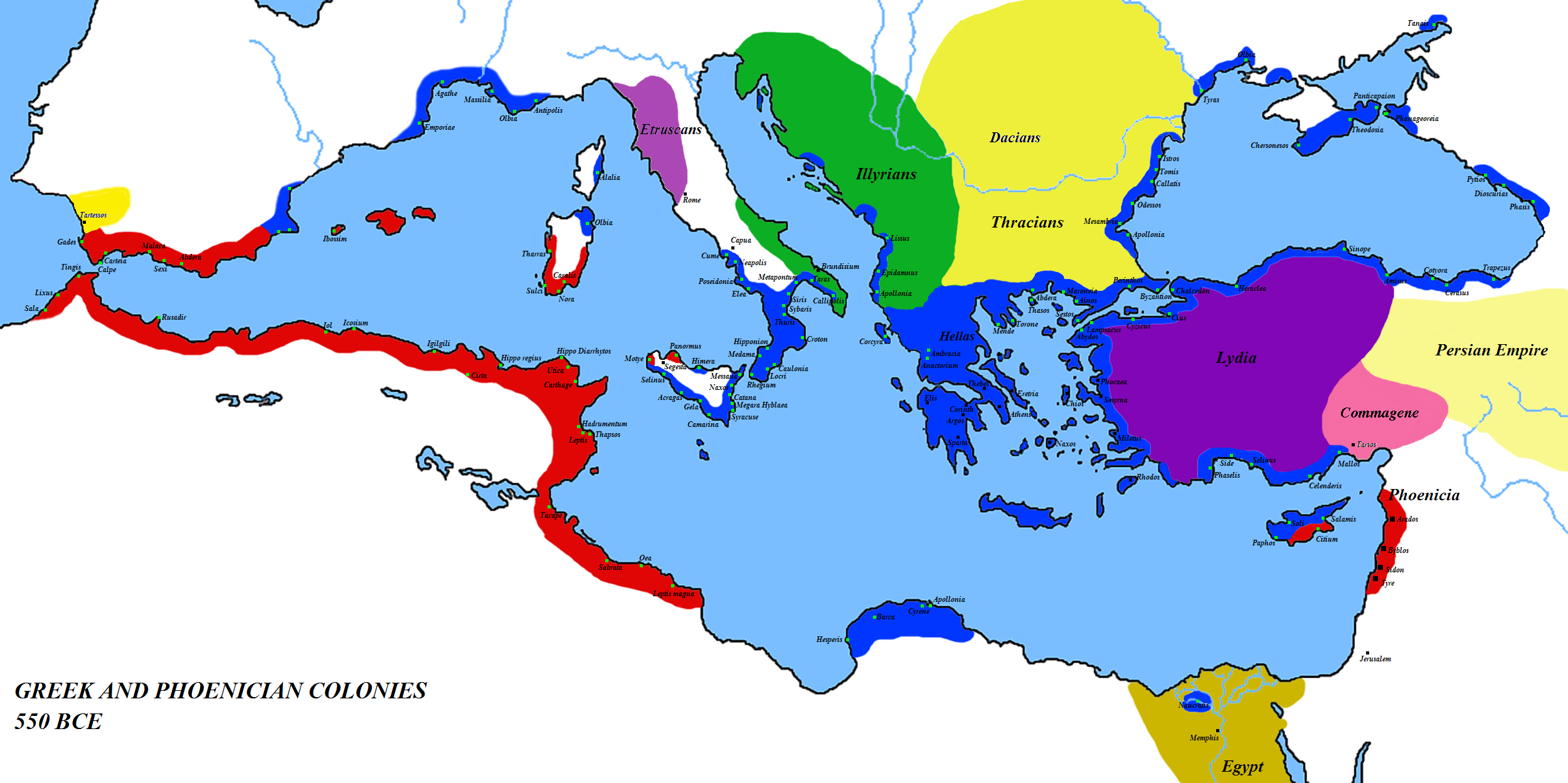
Map of Phoenician (red) and Greek colonies (blue) at about 550 BCE

Some legends associated the biblical placename Tarshish with Tartessus, a locale in southern Spain, and suggesting Jewish traders were active in Spain during the Phoenician and Carthaginian eras. In the Bible, Trashish is mentioned in the books of Jeremiah, Ezekiel, I Kings, Jonah and Romans; In generally describing Tyre's empire from west to east, Tarshish is listed first (Ezekiel 27.12–14), and in Jonah 1.3 it is the place to which Jonah sought to flee from the LORD; evidently it represents the westernmost place to which one could sail. One might speculate that commerce conducted by Jewish emissaries, merchants, craftsmen, or other tradesmen among the Canaanitic-speaking Phoenicians from Tyre might have brought them to Tarshish. Although the notion of Tarshish as Spain is merely based on suggestive material, it leaves open the possibility of a very early Jewish presence in the Iberian peninsula.

According to Rabbi David Kimchi (1160–1235), in his commentary on Obadiah 1:20, Ṣarfat and Sepharad refer to the Jews exiled during the war with Titus and who went as far as the countries Alemania (Germany), Escalona, France and Spain. He explicitly identified Ṣarfat and Sepharad as France and Spain, respectively. Some scholars think that, in the case of the place-name, Ṣarfat (lit. Ṣarfend) – which, as noted, was applied to the Jewish Diaspora in France, the association with France was made only exegetically because of its similarity in spelling with the name פרנצא (France), by a reversal of its letters.

=== Arrival after the destruction of the First Temple ===
Spanish Jew Moses de León (ca. 1250 – 1305) mentions a tradition concerning the first Jewish exiles, saying that the vast majority of the first exiles driven away from the land of Israel during the Babylonian captivity refused to return, for they had seen that the Second Temple would be destroyed like the first. In yet another teaching, passed down later by Moshe ben Machir in the 16th century, an explicit reference is made to the fact that Jews have lived in Spain since the destruction of the First Temple:

Now, I have heard that this praise, emet weyaṣiv [which is now used by us in the prayer rite] was sent by the exiles who have driven away from Jerusalem and who were not with Ezra in Babylon and that Ezra had sent inquiring after them, but they did not wish to go up [there], replied that since they were destined to go off again into exile a second time, and that the Temple would once again be destroyed, why should we then double our anguish? It is best for us that we remain here in our place and to serve God. Now, I have heard that they are the people of Ṭulayṭulah (Toledo) and those who are near to them. However, that they might not be thought of as wicked men and those who are lacking in fidelity, may God forbid, they wrote down for them this magnanimous praise, etc.

Similarly, Gedaliah ibn Jechia the Spaniard has written:

In [5,]252 anno mundi [1492 CE], the King Ferdinand and his wife, Isabella, made war with the Ishmaelites who were in Granada and took it, and while they returned they commanded the Jews in all of his kingdoms that in but a short time they were to take leave from the countries [they had heretofore possessed], they being Castile, Navarre, Catalonia, Aragón, Granada and Sicily. Then the [Jewish] inhabitants of Ṭulayṭulah (Toledo) answered that they were not present [in the land of Judea] at the time when their Christ was put to death. Apparently, it was written upon a large stone in the city's street which some very ancient sovereign inscribed and testified that the Jews of Ṭulayṭulah (Toledo) did not depart from there during the building of the Second Temple, and were not involved in putting to death [the man whom they called] Christ. Yet, no apology was of any avail to them, neither unto the rest of the Jews, till at length, six hundred-thousand souls had evacuated from there.

Don Isaac Abrabanel, a prominent Jewish figure in the 15th century and one of the king's trusted courtiers who witnessed the 1492 expulsion of Jews, informs his readers that the first Jews to reach Spain were brought by ship to Spain by a certain Phiros, a confederate of the king of Babylon in laying siege to Jerusalem. This man was a Greek by birth, but had been given a kingdom in Spain. He became related by marriage to a certain Espan, the nephew of King Heracles, who also ruled over a kingdom in Spain. This Heracles later renounced his throne because of his preference for his native country in Greece, leaving his kingdom to his nephew, Espan, from whom the country's name España (Spain) derives. The Jewish exiles transported there by the said Phiros were descended by lineage from Judah, Benjamin, Shimon and Levi, and were, according to Abrabanel, settled in two districts in southern Spain: one, Andalusia, in the city of Lucena – a city so-called by the Jewish exiles that had come there; the second, in the country around Ṭulayṭulah (Toledo). Abrabanel says that the name Ṭulayṭulah was given to the city by its first Jewish inhabitants, and surmises that the name may have meant טלטול (= wandering), on account of their wandering from Jerusalem. He says, furthermore, that the original name of the city was Pirisvalle, so named by its early pagan inhabitants.

According to Abrabanel, the Jewish exiles that arrived in Spain during the biblical period were later joined by those brought by Titus after the destruction of the Second Temple.

=== Arrival after the destruction of the Second Temple ===
Rabbi and scholar Abraham ibn Daud wrote in 1161: "A tradition exists with the [Jewish] community of Granada that they are from the inhabitants of Jerusalem, of the descendants of Judah and Benjamin, rather than from the villages, the towns in the outlying districts [of Israel]." Elsewhere, he writes about his maternal grandfather's family and how they came to Spain: "When Titus prevailed over Jerusalem, his officer who was appointed over Hispania appeased him, requesting that he send to him captives made-up of the nobles of Jerusalem, and so he sent a few of them to him, and there were amongst them those who made curtains and who were knowledgeable in the work of silk, and [one] whose name was Baruch, and they remained in Mérida." Here, Rabbi Abraham ben David refers to the second influx of Jews into Spain, shortly after the destruction of Israel's Second Temple in 70 CE.

Don Isaac Abrabanel wrote that he found written in the ancient annals of Spanish history collected by the kings of Spain that the 50,000 Jewish households then residing in the cities throughout Spain were the descendants of men and women who were sent to Spain by the Roman Emperor and who had formerly been subjected to him, and whom Titus had originally exiled from places in or around Jerusalem. The two Jewish exiles, those sent to Spain after the destruction of the First Temple, and those sent there after the destruction of the Second Temple, joined together and became one community.

== Under the Visigoths (5th century to 711) ==
Natural migration brought most of the Iberian Peninsula under Visigothic rule by the early 5th century. Other than in their contempt for Catholics, who reminded them of the Romans, the Visigoths did not generally take much of an interest in the religious creeds within their kingdom. It was only in 506, when Alaric II (484–507) published his Breviarium Alaricianum in which he adopted the laws of the ousted Romans that a Visigothic king concerned himself with the Jews.

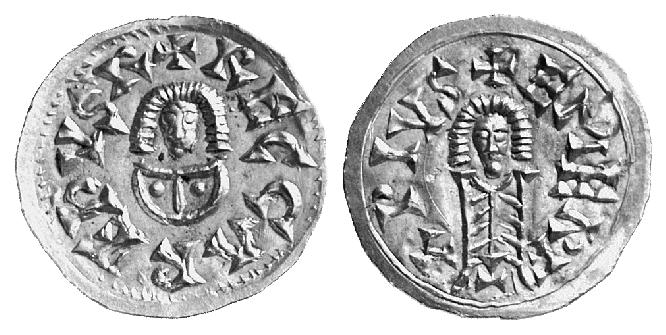
Visigothic coinage: King Recared

The tides turned even more dramatically following the conversion of the Visigothic royal family under Recared from Arianism to Catholicism in 587. In their desire to consolidate the realm under the new religion, the Visigoths adopted an aggressive policy concerning the Jews. As the king and the church acted in a single interest, the situation for the Jews deteriorated. At the Toledo III Council in 589, bishops endorsed the Breviary's restrictions on Jews, including prohibitions on intermarriage with Christians, owning Christian slaves, and holding public office.

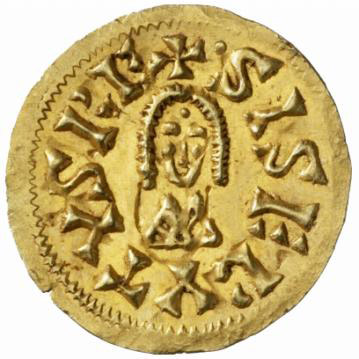
Visigothic coinage: Sisebut

While the policies of the subsequent Kings Liuva II (601–604), Witteric (603–610), and Gundemar (610–612) are unknown, Sisebut (612–620) embarked on Recared's course with renewed vigour. Sisebut instituted what was to become a recurring phenomenon in European Christian kingdoms, the first edicts requiring the mass conversion of all Jews to Christianity. After his 613 decree that Jews must either convert or be expelled, some fled to Gaul or North Africa, while as many as 90,000 converted. Many of the conversos, like those of later periods, maintained their Jewish identities in secret. During the more tolerant reign of Suintila (621–631), most of the conversos returned to Judaism, and a number of the exiles returned to Spain.

In 633, the Fourth Council of Toledo, while taking a stance in opposition to compulsory baptism, convened to address the problem of crypto-Judaism. The canons referred to forcibly converted Jews as "baptized Jews" or simply as "Jews," but never as "Christians". It was decided that if professed Christian were determined to be a practising Jew, their children were to be taken away to be raised in monasteries or trusted Christian households. The council further directed that all who had reverted to Judaism during the reign of Swintila had to return to Christianity. The trend toward intolerance continued with the ascent of Chintila (636–639). He directed the Sixth Council of Toledo to order that only Catholics could remain in the kingdom, and taking an unusual step further, he excommunicated "in advance" any of his successors who did not act in accordance with his anti-Jewish edicts. Again, many converted, but others chose exile.

However, the "problem" continued. The Eighth Council of Toledo in 653 again tackled the issue of Jews within the realm. Further measures at the time included the forbidding of all Jewish rites (including circumcision and the observation of the Shabbat), and all converted Jews had to promise to put to death, either by burning or by stoning, any of their brethren known to have relapsed to Judaism. The council was aware that prior efforts had been frustrated by lack of compliance among authorities on the local level; therefore, anyone, including nobles and clergy, found to have aided Jews in their practice of Judaism was to be punished by seizure of one quarter of their property and excommunication.

The efforts again proved unsuccessful. The Jewish population remained sufficiently sizable as to prompt Wamba (672–680) to issue limited expulsion orders against them, and the reign of Erwig (680–687) also seemed vexed by the issue. The Twelfth Council of Toledo again called for forced baptism and, for those who disobeyed, seizure of property, corporal punishment, exile, ll and slavery. Jewish children over seven years of age were taken from their parents and similarly dealt with in 694. Erwig also took measures to ensure that Catholic sympathisers would not be inclined to aid Jews in their efforts to subvert the council's rulings. Heavy fines awaited any nobles who acted in favour of the Jews, and members of the clergy who were remiss in enforcement were subject to a number of punishments.

Egica (687–702), recognising the wrongness of forced baptism, relaxed the pressure on the conversos but kept it up on practising Jews. Economic hardships included increased taxes and the forced sale, at a fixed price, of all property ever acquired from Christians. That effectively ended all agricultural activity for the Jews of Spain. Furthermore, Jews were not to engage in commerce with the Christians of the kingdom or to conduct business with Christians overseas. Egica's measures were upheld by the Sixteenth Council of Toledo in 693.

In 694, at the Council of Toledo, Jews were condemned to slavery by the Visigoths because of a plot to revolt against them encouraged by the Eastern Roman Empire and Romans still residing in Spain.

After the Visigoths elites adopted the Nicene creed, persecutions of Jews increased. The degree of complicity that the Jews had in the Islamic invasion in 711 is uncertain, but since they were openly treated as enemies in the country in which they had resided for generations, it would be no surprise for them to have appealed to the Moors to the south, who were quite tolerant in comparison to the Visigoths, for aid. In any case, the Jews in 694 were accused of conspiring with Muslims across the Mediterranean. Jews were declared traitors, including baptised Jews, found their property confiscated and themselves enslaved. The decree exempted only the converts who dwelt in the mountain passes of Septimania, who were necessary for the kingdom's protection.

The Eastern Roman Empire sent its navy on numerous occasions in the late 7th century and the early 8th century to try to instill uprisings in the Jewish and Christian Roman populations in Spain and Gaul against their Visigoth and Frankish rulers that was also aimed at halting the expansion of Muslim Arabs in the Roman world.

The Jews of Spain were utterly embittered and alienated by Catholic rule at the time of the Muslim invasion. The Moors were perceived as a liberating force and welcomed by Jews eager to help them to administer the country. In many conquered towns, the Muslims left the garrison in the hands of the Jews before they proceeded further north, which initiated the Golden Age of Spanish Jews.

== Jewish life in al-Andalus (711–1085) ==
=== Islamic conquest of Iberia ===
With the victory of Tariq ibn Ziyad in 711, the lives of the Sephardim changed dramatically. For the most part, the invasion of the Moors was welcomed by the Jews of Iberia.

Both Muslim and Catholic sources tell that Jews provided valuable aid to the invaders. Once the city was captured, the defence of Córdoba was left in the hands of Jews, and Granada, Málaga, Seville, and Toledo were left to a mixed army of Jews and Moors. The Chronicle of Lucas de Tuy records that when the Catholics left Toledo on Sunday before Easter to go to the Church of Saint Leocadia to listen to the divine sermon, the Jews acted treacherously, informed the Saracens, closed the gates of the city before the Catholics and opened them for the Moors. However, unlike de Tuy's account, Rodrigo Jiménez de Rada's De rebus Hispaniae maintains that Toledo was "almost completely empty of its inhabitants" not because of Jewish treachery but because "many had fled to Amiara, others to Asturias and some to the mountains" and the city was then fortified by a militia of Arabs and Jews (3.24). Although in the cases of some towns, the behaviour of the Jews may have been conducive to Muslim success, it was of limited impact overall.

In spite of the restrictions placed upon the Jews as dhimmis, life under Muslim rule was one of great opportunity in comparison to that under prior Catholic Visigoths, as was testified by the influx of Jews from abroad. To Jews throughout the Catholic and Muslim worlds, Iberia was seen as a land of relative tolerance and opportunity. After initial Arab-Berber victories, especially with the establishment of Umayyad dynasty rule by Abd al-Rahman I in 755, the native Jewish community was joined by Jews from the rest of Europe, as well as from Arab territories from Morocco to Mesopotamia (the latter region was known as Babylonia in Jewish sources). Thus, the Sephardim found themselves enriched culturally, intellectually, and religiously by the commingling of diverse Jewish traditions. Contacts with Middle Eastern communities were strengthened, and the influence of the Babylonian academies of Sura and Pumbedita was at its greatest. As a result, until the mid-10th century, much Sephardic scholarship focused on Halakha.

Although not as influential, traditions of the Levant, known as Palestine, were also introduced, in an increased interest in Hebrew and biblical studies.

Arabic culture, of course, also made a lasting impact on Sephardic cultural development. General re-evaluation of scripture was prompted by Muslim anti-Jewish polemics and the spread of rationalism, as well as the anti-Rabbanite polemics of Karaite Judaism.

In adopting Arabic, as had the Babylonian geonim (the heads of the Talmudic Academies in Babylonia), the cultural and intellectual achievements of Arabic culture were opened up to the educated Jew, as was much of the scientific and philosophical speculation of Greek culture, which had been best preserved by Arab scholars. The meticulous regard which the Arabs had for grammar and style also had the effect of stimulating an interest among Jews in philological matters in general. Arabic came to be the main language of Sephardic science, philosophy and everyday business. From the second half of the 9th century, most Jewish prose, including many non-halakhic religious works, was in Arabic. The thorough adoption of Arabic greatly facilitated the assimilation of Jews into Arabic culture.

Although initially, the often-bloody disputes among Muslim factions generally kept Jews out of the political sphere, the first approximately two centuries that preceded the Golden Age were marked by increased activity by Jews in a variety of professions, including medicine, commerce, finance and agriculture.

By the ninth century, some members of the Sephardic community felt confident enough to take part in proselytizing amongst previously-Jewish "Catholics". Most famous were the heated correspondences sent between Bodo the Frank, a former deacon who had converted to Judaism in 838, and the converso Bishop of Córdoba, Álvaro of Córdoba. Both men, by using such epithets as "wretched compiler", tried to convince the other to return to their former religion but to no avail.

During the al-Andalus period, Jews primarily lived in cities rather than rural areas. They likely made up around 2% of the overall population, though their presence was much more significant in certain regions. In medieval Granada, Jews may have even formed the majority, and the city was popularly referred to as Gharnātat al-Yahūd—"Granada of the Jews."

=== Caliphate of Córdoba ===
After the Umayyad dynasty was overthrown by the Abbasids in 750, a surviving prince, 'Abd al-Raḥmān I, fled Damascus and eventually reached the Iberian Peninsula, where he established the independent Emirate of Córdoba in 756, with the city as its capital. In 929, his descendant 'Abd al-Raḥmān III proclaimed the Caliphate of Córdoba, asserting full political and religious independence from the Abbasid and Fatimid caliphates in the east. This marked the beginning of a period of relative stability, prosperity, and cultural flourishing in al-Andalus, attracting increasing numbers of Jewish migrants from North Africa, Italy and the eastern Mediterranean, where conditions had become increasingly unstable. A vibrant, largely Arabic-speaking Jewish community emerged, integrated into the region's commercial, intellectual, and administrative life.

The onset of the so-called Golden Age is closely associated with the career of Ḥasdai ibn Shaprūṭ (c. 915–c. 970), a Jewish courtier who served 'Abd al-Raḥmān III and his successor, al-Ḥakam II. Initially recognized for his medical expertise, he rose to become a trusted advisor, diplomat, and financial administrator. Appointed nasi (leader) of the Jewish community, he played a central role in fostering a cultural and scholarly renaissance. Under his patronage, Hebrew studies flourished, and Córdoba became, in the words of one scholar, the "Mecca of Jewish scholars who could be assured of a hospitable welcome from Jewish courtiers and men of means." He founded a talmudic academy in the city under Rabbi Moses ben Hanoch, acquired Jewish texts from Babylonia, and drew to his circle notable figures such as Dunash ben Labraṭ, the innovator of Hebrew metrical poetry, and Menaḥem ben Saruq, compiler of the first Hebrew dictionary, which later gained wide use among Jewish communities in Germany and France.

Hasdai benefited world Jewry by creating a favourable environment for scholarly pursuits within Iberia but also by using his influence to intervene on behalf of foreign Jews, as is reflected in his letter to the Byzantine Princess Helena. In it, he requested protection for the Jews under Byzantine rule, attested to the fair treatment of the Christians of al-Andalus and indicated that such was contingent on the treatment of Jews abroad. As a prominent dignitary, he corresponded with the Khazars, a kingdom that had converted to Judaism in the 8th century.

=== Taifa period ===
In 1009, the Caliphate of Córdoba entered a period of civil war and instability that ultimately led to its collapse. By 1031, the caliphate had formally disintegrated, marking the beginning of the Taifa period in al-Andalus. The region fragmented into numerous independent Muslim principalities, or taifas, each governed by local rulers. These mini-states were often centered around major cities—such as Seville, Granada, Zaragoza, and Toledo—and ruled by local dynasties or ambitious military leaders. While politically divided and frequently in conflict with one another, the taifas also experienced a burst of cultural and intellectual activity, often competing in patronage of poets, artists, and scientists. Rather than having a stifling effect, the disintegration of the caliphate expanded the opportunities to Jewish and other professionals. The services of Jewish scientists, doctors, traders, poets and scholars were generally valued by the Christian as well as Muslim rulers of regional centres, especially as recently-conquered towns were put back into order.

One of the most prominent Jews to hold high office in the taifa kingdoms was Samuel ibn Naghrillah, also known as Samuel ha-Nagid (993–1056). According to tradition, his rise to power began when his refined calligraphy brought him to the attention of the court in Granada, where he entered the service of King Ḥabbūs al-Muzaffar and later his son Bādīs ibn Ḥabbūs. Over the course of three decades, Samuel served as vizier, policy advisor, and military commander, one of the very few Jews in Islamic history, along with his son Joseph ibn Naghrilla, to lead Muslim armies. The period during which Samuel ha-Nagid commanded a Jewish-led army represents the only known instance of such leadership between antiquity and the modern state of Israel. A distinguished poet and scholar, Samuel also authored an introduction to the Talmud that remains influential.

During the taifa period, Jews also held vizierial positions in cities such as Seville, Lucena, and Zaragoza. Lucena experienced its heyday as a Jewish community from the 10th to the early 12th century, when it became one of the most important centers of Jewish life in al-Andalus; its population was reportedly entirely Jewish, and it was home to a prestigious yeshiva led by prominent scholars such as Isaac Alfasi and Joseph ibn Migash.

Samuel ha-Nagid is regarded as one of the greatest poets of the Golden Age of Hebrew poetry in Spain, alongside figures such as Solomon ibn Gabirol, Judah Halevi and Abraham and Moses ibn Ezra. These poets composed a wide range of works, including secular poetry on love, friendship, nature, and war, as well as liturgical poems and religious hymns praising God and the covenant between the Creator and the people of Israel. Judah Halevi, born in Tudela, Navarre, is considered one of the greatest Hebrew poets of all time. Among his most celebrated works are the Zionides (Shirei Tzion), which express longing for the Land of Israel—especially the well-known poems Libi BaMizrah ("My Heart is in the East") and Siyyon ha-lo tishali ("Zion, Do You Not Inquire?"). HaLevi was also the author of the Kuzari, a fictional dialogue inspired by the Khazar king's conversion to Judaism. The work advocates the spiritual primacy of Judaism over rationalist philosophy and other religions, and concludes with a call to return to the Land of Israel. Later in life, he left Spain and set out for the Land of Israel, composing a final series of poems during his journey; he is believed to have died en route or at Jerusalem's gates. His poetic and philosophical legacy continued to influence Jewish thought and literature long after his death, and his works remain foundational texts in the Hebrew literary tradition.

The intellectual achievements of the Sephardim of al-Andalus influenced the lives of non-Jews as well. Most notable of the literary contributions is Ibn Gabirol's neo-Platonic Fons Vitae ("The Source of Life"). Thought by many to have been written by a Christian, the work was admired by Christians and studied in monasteries throughout the Middle Ages. Some Arabic philosophers followed Jewish ones in their ideas although that phenomenon was somewhat hindered in that, although in Arabic, Jewish philosophical works were usually written with Hebrew characters. Jews were also active in such fields as astronomy, medicine, logic and mathematics. In addition to training the mind in logical yet abstract and subtle modes of thought, the study of the natural world, as the direct study of the work of the Creator, was ideally a way to better understand and become closer to God. Al-Andalus also became a major centre of Jewish philosophy during Hasdai's time. Following the tradition of the Talmud and the Midrash, many of the most notable Jewish philosophers were dedicated to the field of ethics, although the ethical Jewish rationalism rested on the notion that traditional approaches had not been successful in their treatments of the subject in that they were lacking in rational, scientific arguments. In addition to contributions of original work, the Sephardim were active as translators. Greek texts were rendered into Arabic, Arabic into Hebrew, Hebrew and Arabic into Latin and all combinations of vice versa occurred. In translating the great works of Arabic, Hebrew, and Greek into Latin, Iberian Jews were instrumental in bringing the fields of science and philosophy, which formed much of the basis of Renaissance learning, into the rest of Europe.

The so-called Golden Age of Jewish life in Muslim Spain began to wane well before the completion of the Christian Reconquista, eroded in part by the growing influence of zealot Islamic movements from North Africa. A major turning point came with the Granada massacre of 1066, when a Muslim mob stormed the royal palace where Joseph ibn Nagrela, son of Samuel ha-Nagid and vizier to the emir of Granada, had sought refuge. He was seized and publicly crucified, and the violence quickly escalated into a full-scale pogrom in which 4,000 Jews were reportedly killed and 1,500 Jewish families were attacked.

== Almoravids and Almohads (1085–1215) ==
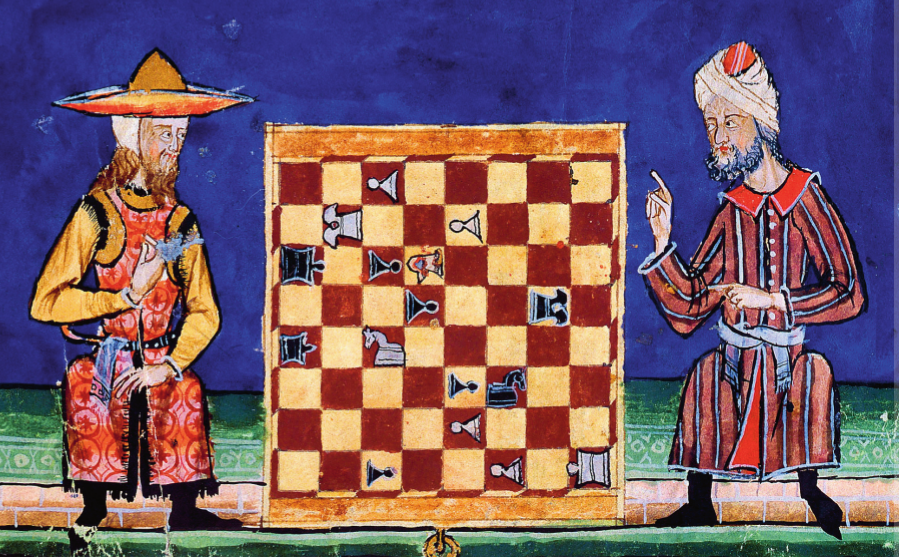
A Jew and a Muslim playing chess in 13th-century al-Andalus. Libro de los juegos, commissioned by Alphonse X of Castile, 13th century. Madrid.

After the fall of Toledo to Christian forces in 1085, the ruler of Seville appealed to the Almoravids, a Berber Muslim dynasty from North Africa, for military assistance. The Almoravids, known for their strict religious conservatism, abhorred the more cosmopolitan and tolerant culture of al-Andalus, including the elevated status that some dhimmīs (non-Muslims under Muslim rule) held within Andalusi society. In addition to battling the Christians, who were gaining ground, the Almoravides implemented numerous reforms to bring al-Andalus more in line with their notions of proper Islam. In spite of large-scale forcible conversions, Sephardic culture was not entirely decimated. Members of Lucena's Jewish community, for example, managed to bribe their way out of conversion. As the spirit of Andalusian Islam was absorbed by the Almoravides, policies concerning Jews were relaxed. The poet Moses ibn Ezra continued to write during this time, and several Jews served as diplomats and physicians to the Almoravides.

Wars in North Africa with Muslim tribes eventually forced the Almoravides to withdraw their forces from Iberia. As the Christians advanced, Iberian Muslims again appealed to their brethren to the south, this time to those who had displaced the Almoravides in north Africa. The Almohads, who had taken control of much of Islamic Iberia by 1172, far surpassed the Almoravides in fundamentalist outlook and treated the dhimmis harshly. Jews and Christians were expelled from Morocco and Islamic Spain. Faced with the choice of either death or conversion, many Jews emigrated. Some, such as the family of Maimonides, fled south and east to the more tolerant Muslim lands, and others went northward to settle in the growing Christian kingdoms.

Meanwhile, the Reconquista continued in the north. By the early 12th century, conditions for some Jews in the emerging Christian kingdoms were becoming increasingly favourable. As had happened during the reconstruction of towns after the breakdown of authority under the Umayyads, the services of Jews were employed by the Christian leaders, who were increasingly emerging victorious during the later Reconquista. The Jews' knowledge of the language and the culture of the enemy, their skills as diplomats and professionals and their desire for relief from intolerable conditions rendered their services of great value to the Christians during the Reconquista, the very same reasons that they had proved useful to the Arabs in the early stages of the Muslim invasion. The necessity of having conquerors settle in reclaimed territories also outweighed the prejudices of antisemitism, at least while the Islamic threat was imminent. Thus, as conditions in Islamic Iberia worsened, immigration to Christian principalities increased.

The Jews from the Muslim south were not entirely secure in their northward migrations, however. Old prejudices were compounded by newer ones. Suspicions of complicity with Islam were alive, and Jews who immigrated from Muslim territories spoke Arabic. However, many of the newly-arrived Jews of the north prospered during the late eleventh and early twelfth centuries. The majority of Latin documentation regarding Jews during the period refers to their landed property, fields and vineyards.

In many ways, life had come full circle for the Sephardim of al-Andalus. As conditions became more oppressive in the areas under Muslim rule during the 12th and the 13th centuries, Jews again looked to an outside culture for relief. Christian leaders of reconquered cities granted them extensive autonomy, and Jewish scholarship recovered and developed as communities grew in size and importance (Assis, p. 18). However, the Reconquista Jews never reached the same heights as had those of the Golden Age.

== Christian kingdoms (974–1300) ==
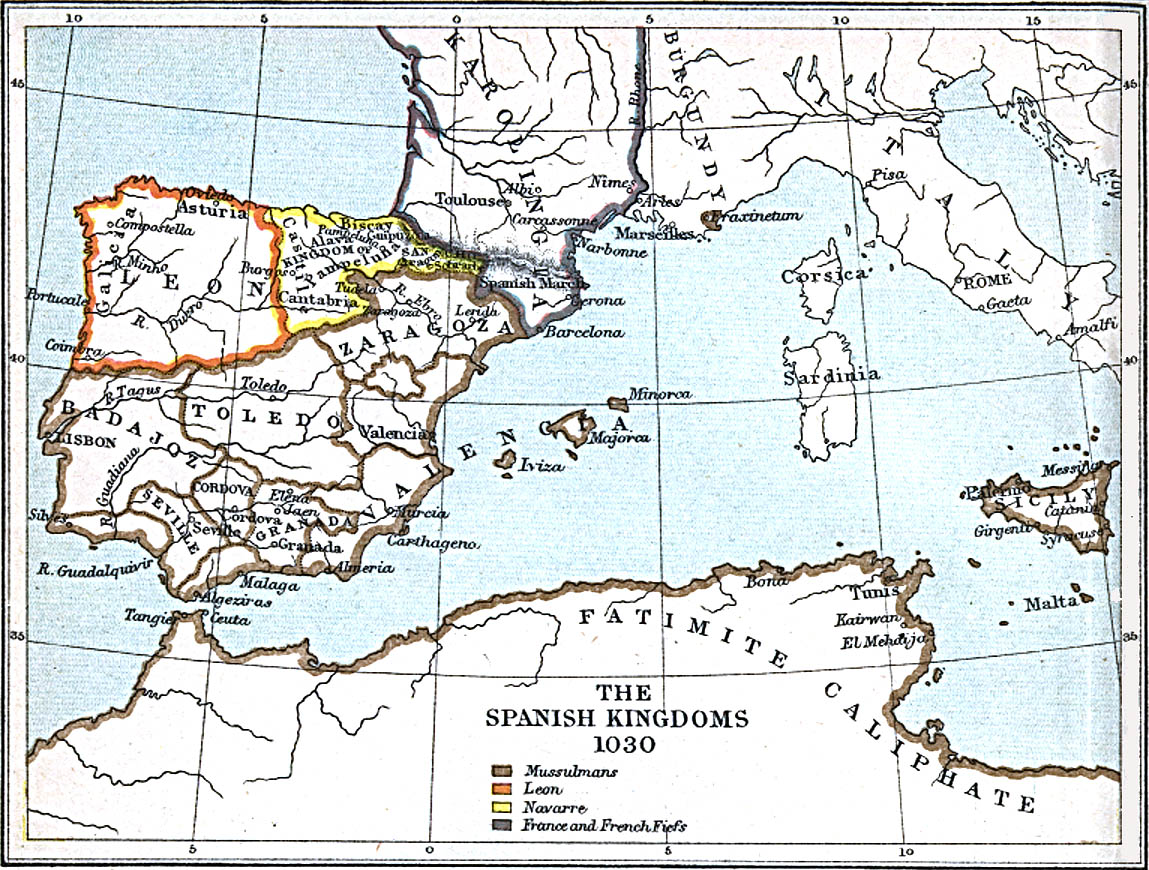
The Spanish kingdoms in 1030

=== Early rule (974–1085) ===
Catholic princes, the counts of Castile and the first kings of León, treated the Jews harshly. In their operations against the Moors they did not spare the Jews, destroying their synagogues and killing their teachers and scholars. Only gradually did the rulers come to realize that, surrounded as they were by powerful enemies, they could not afford to turn the Jews against them. Garcia Fernandez, Count of Castile, in the fuero of Castrojeriz (974), placed the Jews in many respects on an equality with Catholics; and similar measures were adopted by the Council of Leon (1020), presided over by Alfonso V. In Leon many Jews owned real estate, and engaged in agriculture and viticulture as well as in the handicrafts; and here, as in other towns, they lived on friendly terms with the Christian population. The Council of Coyanza (1050) therefore found it necessary to revive the old Visigothic law forbidding, under pain of punishment by the Church, Jews and Christians to live together in the same house, or to eat together.

=== Toleration and Jewish immigration (1085–1212) ===
Ferdinand I of Castile set aside a part of the Jewish taxes for the use of the Church, and even the not very religious-minded Alfonso VI gave to the church of León the taxes paid by the Jews of Castro. Alfonso VI, the conqueror of Toledo (1085), was tolerant and benevolent in his attitude toward the Jews, for which he won the praise of Pope Alexander II. To estrange the wealthy and industrious Jews from the Moors he offered the former various privileges. In the fuero of Najara Sepulveda, issued and confirmed by him in 1076, he not only granted the Jews full equality with Catholics, but he even accorded them the rights enjoyed by the nobility. To show their gratitude to the king for the rights granted them, the Jews willingly placed themselves at his and the country's service. Alfonso's army contained 40,000 Jews, who were distinguished from the other combatants by their black-and-yellow turbans; for the sake of this Jewish contingent the Battle of Sagrajas was not begun until after the Sabbath had passed. The king's favoritism toward the Jews, which became so pronounced that Pope Gregory VII warned him not to permit Jews to rule over Catholics, roused the hatred and envy of the latter. After the Battle of Uclés, at which the Infante Sancho, together with 30,000 men were killed, an anti-Jewish riot broke out in Toledo; many Jews were slain, and their houses and synagogues were burned (1108). Alfonso intended to punish the murderers and incendiaries, but died in June 1109 before he could carry out his intention. After his death the inhabitants of Carrión de los Condes fell upon the Jews; many were slain, others were imprisoned, and their houses were pillaged.

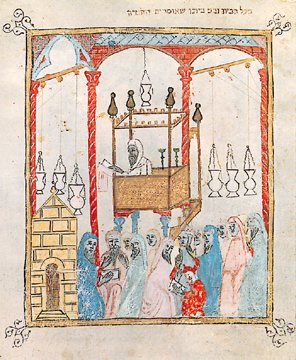
Image of a cantor reading the Passover story, from the 14th-century Barcelona Haggadah

Alfonso VII, who assumed the title of Emperor of Leon, Toledo, and Santiago, curtailed in the beginning of his reign the rights and liberties which his father had granted the Jews. He ordered that neither a Jew nor a convert might exercise legal authority over Catholics, and he held the Jews responsible for the collection of the royal taxes. Soon, however, he became more friendly, confirming the Jews in all their former privileges and even granting them additional ones, by which they were placed on equality with Catholics. Considerable influence with the king was enjoyed by Judah ben Joseph ibn Ezra (Nasi). After the conquest of Calatrava (1147) the king placed Judah in command of the fortress, later making him his court chamberlain. Judah ben Joseph stood in such favor with the king that the latter, at his request, not only admitted into Toledo the Jews who had fled from the persecutions of the Almohades, but even assigned many fugitives dwellings in Flascala (near Toledo), Fromista, Carrion, Palencia, and other places, where new congregations were soon established.

After the brief reign of King Sancho III, a war broke out between Fernando II of León, (who granted the Jews special privileges), and the united kings of Aragon and Navarre. Jews fought in both armies, and after the declaration of peace they were placed in charge of the fortresses. Alfonso VIII of Castile (1166–1214), who had succeeded to the throne, entrusted the Jews with guarding Or, Celorigo, and, later, Mayorga, while Sancho the Wise of Navarre placed them in charge of Estella, Funes, and Murañon. During the reign of Alfonso VIII the Jews gained still greater influence, aided, doubtless, by the king's love of the beautiful Rachel (Fermosa) of Toledo, who was Jewish. When the king was defeated at the Battle of Alarcos by the Almohades under Yusuf Abu Ya'kub al-Mansur, the defeat was attributed to the king's love-affair with Fermosa, and she and her relatives were murdered in Toledo by the nobility. After the victory at Alarcos the emir Muhammad al-Nasir ravaged Castile with a powerful army and threatened to overrun the whole of Catholic Spain. The Archbishop of Toledo called to crusade to aid Alfonso. In this war against the Moors the king was greatly aided by the wealthy Jews of Toledo, especially by his "almoxarife mayor", the learned and generous Nasi Joseph ben Solomon ibn Shoshan (Al-Hajib ibn Amar).

=== Turning point (1212–1300) ===
The Spanish kingdoms in 1210

The Crusaders were hailed with joy in Toledo, but this joy was soon changed to sorrow, as far as the Jews were concerned. The Crusaders began the "holy war" in Toledo (1212) by robbing and killing the Jews, and if the knights had not checked them with armed forces all the Jews in Toledo would have been slain. When, after the battle of Las Navas de Tolosa (1212), Alfonso victoriously entered Toledo, the Jews went to meet him in triumphal procession. Shortly before his death (Oct. 1214) the king issued the fuero de Cuenca, settling the legal position of the Jews in a manner favorable to them.

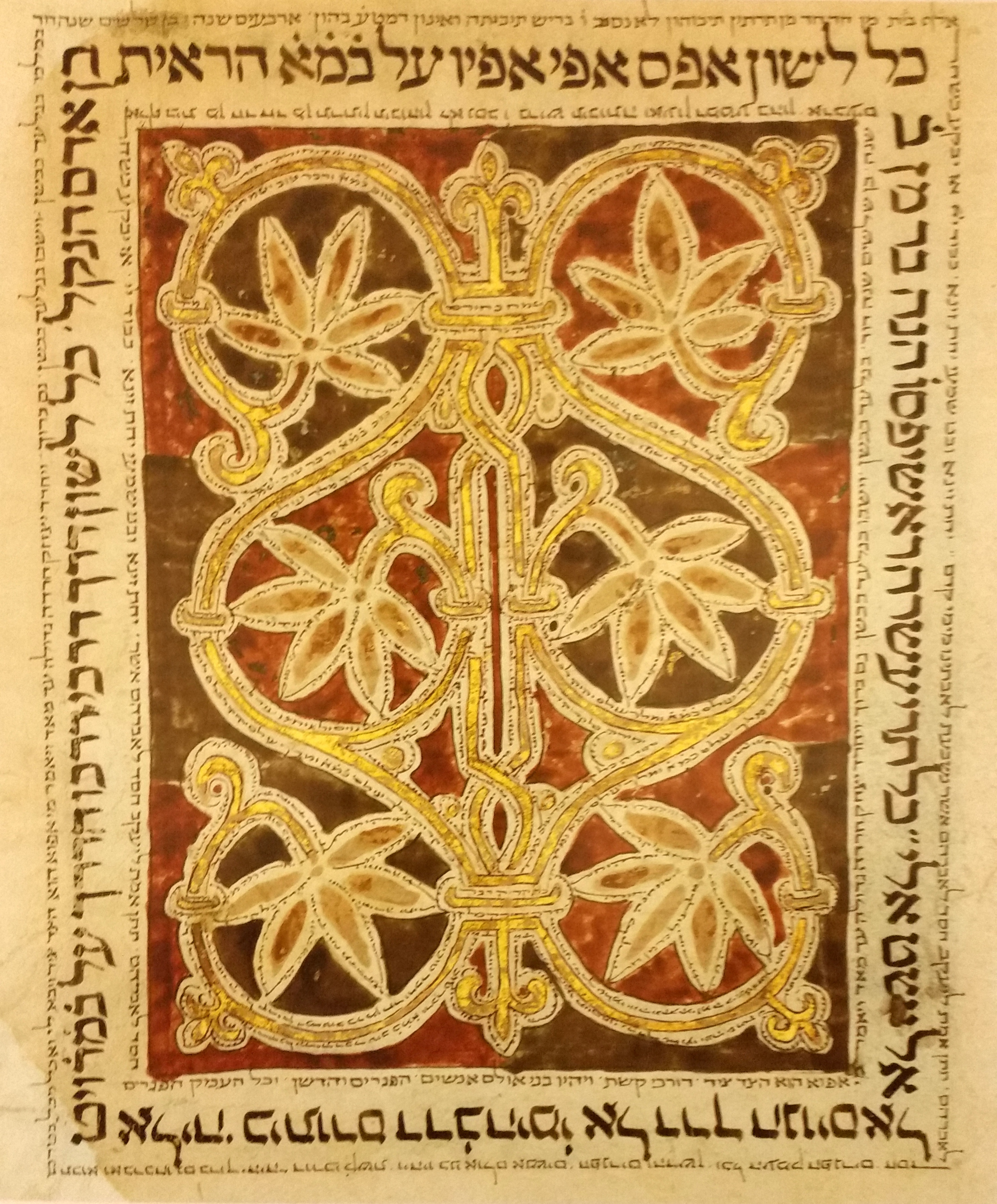
Illuminated Bible manuscript page, Damascus Crown, Burgos, c. 1260

A turning-point in the history of the Jews of Spain was reached under Ferdinand III, (who permanently united the kingdoms of León and Castile), and under James I, the contemporary ruler of Aragon. The clergy's endeavors against the Jews became more and more pronounced. Spanish Jews of both sexes, like the Jews of France, were compelled to distinguish themselves from Catholics by wearing a yellow badge on their clothing; this order was issued to keep them from associating with Catholics, although the reason given was that it was ordered for their own safety. Some Jews such as Vidal Taroç, were also allowed to own land.

The papal bull issued by Pope Innocent IV in April 1250, to the effect that Jews might not build a new synagogue without special permission, also made it illegal for Jews to proselytize, under pain of death and confiscation of property. They might not associate with the Catholics, live under the same roof with them, eat and drink with them, or use the same bath; neither might a Catholic partake of wine which had been prepared by a Jew. The Jews might not employ Catholic nurses or servants, and Catholics might use only medicinal remedies which had been prepared by competent Catholic apothecaries. Every Jew should wear the badge, though the king reserved to himself the right to exempt anyone from this obligation; any Jew apprehended without the badge was liable to a fine of ten gold maravedís or to the infliction of ten stripes. Jews were also forbidden to appear in public on Good Friday.

=== The Jewish community in 1300 ===
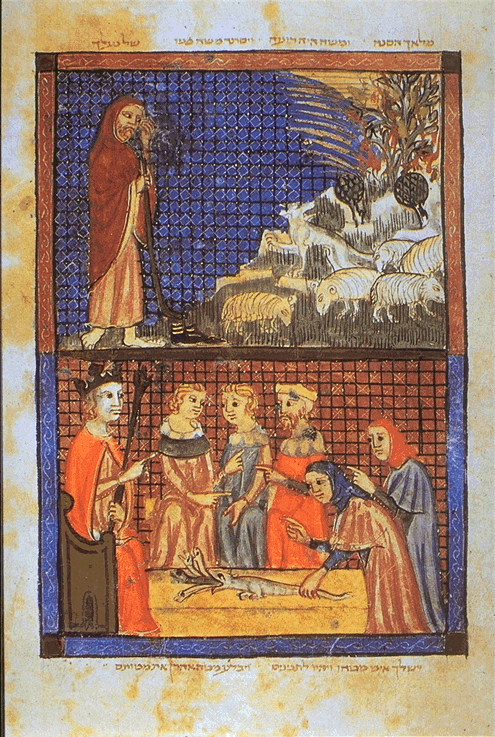
An illustration from the Sarajevo Haggadah, written in fourteenth-century Spain

The Jews in Spain were citizens of the kingdoms in which they resided (Castile, Aragón, and Valencia were the most important), both as regards their customs and their language. They owned real estate, and they cultivated their land with their own hands; they filled public offices, and on account of their industry they became wealthy while their knowledge and ability won them respect and influence. But this prosperity roused the jealousy of the people and provoked the hatred of the clergy; the Jews had to suffer much through these causes. The kings, especially those of Aragon, regarded the Jews as their property; they spoke of "their" Jews, "their" juderías (Jewish neighborhoods), and in their own interest they protected the Jews against violence, making good use of them in every way possible. The Jews were vassals of the king, the same as Christian commoners.

There were about 120 Jewish communities in Catholic Spain around 1300, with somewhere around half a million or more Jews, mostly in Castille. Catalonia, Aragón, and Valencia were more sparsely inhabited by Jews.

Even though the Spanish Jews engaged in many branches of human endeavor—agriculture, viticulture, industry, commerce, and the various handicrafts—it was the money business that procured to some of them their wealth and influence. Kings and prelates, noblemen and farmers, all needed money and could obtain it only from the Jews, to whom they paid from 20 to 25 percent interest. This business, which, in a manner, the Jews were forced to pursue in order to pay the many taxes imposed upon them as well as to raise the compulsory loans demanded of them by the kings, led to their being employed in special positions, as "almonries", bailiffs, tax collectors.

The Jews of Spain formed in themselves a separate political body. They lived almost solely in the Juderias, various enactments being issued from time to time preventing them from living elsewhere. From the time of the Moors they had had their own administration. At the head of the aljamas in Castile stood the "rab de la corte", or "rab mayor" (court, or chief, rabbi), also called "juez mayor" (chief justice), who was the principal mediator between the state and the aljamas. These court rabbis were men who had rendered services to the state, as, for example, David ibn Yah.ya and Abraham Benveniste, or who had been royal physicians, as Meïr Alguadez and Jacob ibn Nuñez, or chief-tax-farmers, as the last incumbent of the court rabbi's office, Abraham Senior. They were appointed by the kings, no regard being paid to the rabbinical qualifications or religious inclination of those chosen

== 1300–1391 ==
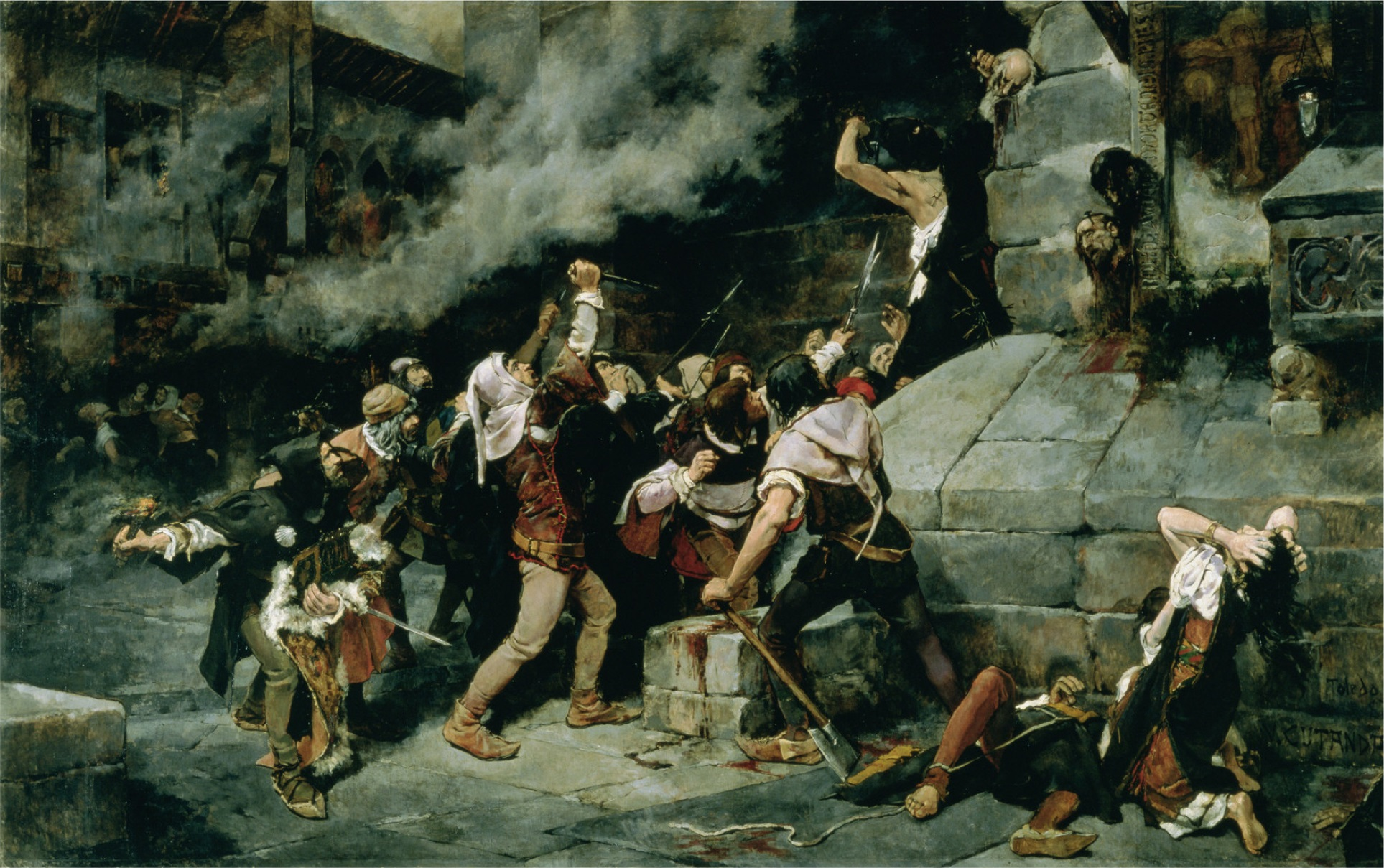
At the Feet of the Savior, massacre of Jews in Toledo, oil on canvas by Vicente Cutanda (1887)

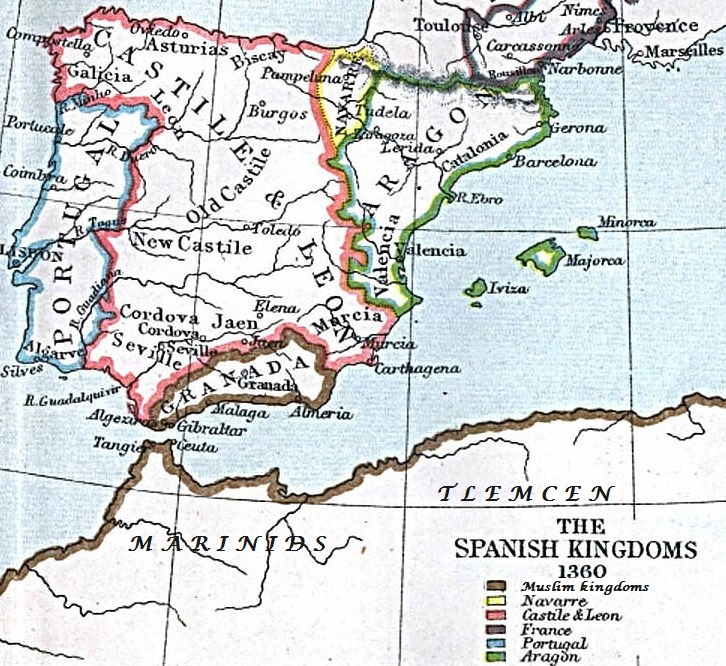
The Spanish kingdoms in 1360

In the beginning of the fourteenth century the position of Jews became precarious throughout Spain as antisemitism increased. Many Jews emigrated from the crowns of Castile and Aragon. It was not until the reigns of Alfonso IV and Peter IV of Aragon, and of the young and active Alfonso XI of Castile (1325), that an improvement set in. In 1328, 5,000 Jews were killed in Navarre following the preaching of a mendicant friar.

Peter of Castile, the son and successor of Alfonso XI, was relatively favorably disposed toward the Jews, who under him reached the zenith of their influence – often exemplified by the success of his treasurer, Samuel ha-Levi. For this reason, the king was called "the heretic" and often "the cruel". Peter, whose education had been neglected, was not quite sixteen years of age when he ascended the throne in 1350. From the commencement of his reign he so surrounded himself with Jews that his enemies in derision spoke of his court as "a Jewish court".

Soon, however a civil war erupted, as Henry II of Castile and his brother, at the head of a mob, invaded on 7 May 1355 that part of the Judería of Toledo called the Alcaná; they plundered the warehouses and murdered about 1200 Jews, without distinction of age or sex. The mob did not, however, succeed in overrunning the Judería of Toledo proper, which was defended by the Jews and by knights loyal to the King. Following the succession of John I of Castile, conditions for Jews seem to have improved somewhat, with John I even making legal exemptions for some Jews, such as Abraham David Taroç.

The more friendly Peter showed himself toward the Jews, and the more he protected them, the more antagonistic became the attitude of his illegitimate half-brother, who, when he invaded Castile in 1360, murdered all the Jews living in Nájera and exposed those of Miranda de Ebro to robbery and death.

=== Massacres of 1366 ===
Everywhere the Jews remained loyal to King Peter, in whose army they fought bravely; the king showed his good-will toward them on all occasions, and when he called the King of Granada to his assistance he especially requested the latter to protect the Jews. Nevertheless they suffered greatly. Villadiego, whose Jewish community numbered many scholars, Aguilar, and many other towns were totally destroyed. The inhabitants of Valladolid, who paid homage to his half-brother Henry, robbed the Jews, destroyed their houses and synagogues, and tore their Torah scrolls to pieces. Paredes, Palencia, and several other communities met with a like fate, and 300 Jewish families from Jaén were taken prisoners to Granada. The suffering, according to a contemporary writer, Samuel Zarza of Palencia, had reached its culminating point, especially in Toledo, which was being besieged by Henry, and in which no less than 8,000 persons died through famine and the hardships of war. This civil conflict did not end until the death of Peter, of whom the victorious brother said, derisively, "Dó esta el fi de puta Judio, que se llama rey de Castilla?" ("Where is the Jewish son of a bitch, who calls himself king of Castile?") Peter was beheaded by Henry and Bertrand Du Guesclin on March 14, 1369. A few weeks before his death he reproached his physician and astrologer Abraham ibn Zarzal for not having told the truth in prophesying good fortune for him.

When Henry de Trastámara ascended the throne as Henry II an era of suffering and intolerance began for the Castilian Jews, culminating in their expulsion. Prolonged warfare had devastated the land; the people had become accustomed to lawlessness, and the Jews had been reduced to poverty.

But in spite of his aversion for the Jews, Henry did not dispense with their services. He employed wealthy Jews—Samuel Abravanel and others—as financial councilors and tax-collectors. His contador mayor, or chief tax-collector, was Joseph Pichon of Seville. The clergy, whose power became greater and greater under the reign of the fratricide, stirred the anti-Jewish prejudices of the masses into clamorous assertion at the Cortes of Toro in 1371. It was demanded that the Jews should be kept far from the palaces of the grandees, should not be allowed to hold public office, should live apart from the Catholics, should not wear costly garments nor ride on mules, should wear the badge, and should not be allowed to bear Catholic names. The king granted the two last-named demands, as well as a request made by the Cortes of Burgos in 1379 that Jews should neither carry arms nor sell weapons; but he did not prevent them from holding religious disputations, nor did he deny them the exercise of criminal jurisprudence. The latter prerogative was not taken from them until the reign of John I, Henry's son and successor; he withdrew it because certain Jews, on the king's coronation-day, by withholding the name of the accused, had obtained his permission to inflict the death-penalty on Joseph Pichon, who stood high in the royal favor; the accusation brought against Pichon included "harboring evil designs, informing, and treason.

=== Anti-Jewish enactments ===
In the Cortes of Soria of 1380, it was enacted that rabbis, or heads of aljamas, should be forbidden, under penalty of a fine of 6,000 maravedís, to inflict upon Jews the penalties of death, mutilation, expulsion, or excommunication; but in civil proceedings they were still permitted to choose their own judges. In consequence of an accusation that the Jewish prayers contained clauses cursing the Catholics, the king ordered that within two months, on pain of a fine of 3,000 maravedís, they should remove from their prayer-books the objectionable passages. Whoever caused the conversion to Judaism of a Moor or of any one confessing another faith, or performed the rite of circumcision upon him, became a slave and the property of the treasury. The Jews no longer dared show themselves in public without the badge, and in consequence of the ever-growing hatred toward them they were no longer sure of life or limb; they were attacked and robbed and murdered in the public streets, and at length the king found it necessary to impose a fine of 6,000 maravedís on any town in which a Jew was found murdered. Against his desire, John was obliged in 1385 to issue an order prohibiting the employment of Jews as financial agents or tax-farmers to the king, queen, infantes, or grandees. To this was added the resolution adopted by the Council of Palencia ordering the complete separation of Jews and Catholics and the prevention of any association between them.

== Massacres and mass conversions of 1391 ==
Slaughter of Jews in Barcelona in 1391 (Josep Segrelles, c. 1910)

"The execution of Joseph Pichon and the inflammatory speeches and sermons delivered in Seville by Archdeacon Ferrand Martínez, the pious Queen Leonora's confessor, soon raised the hatred of the populace to the highest pitch. The feeble King John I, in spite of the endeavors of his physician Moses ibn Ẓarẓal to prolong his life, died at Alcalá de Henares on 9 October 1390, and was succeeded by his eleven-year-old son. The council-regent appointed by the king in his testament, consisting of prelates, grandees, and six citizens from Burgos, Toledo, León, Seville, Córdoba, and Murcia, was powerless; every vestige of respect for law and justice had disappeared. Ferrand Martínez, although deprived of his office, continued, in spite of numerous warnings, to incite the public against the Jews, and encourage it to acts of violence. As early as January 1391, the prominent Jews who were assembled in Madrid received information that riots were threatening in Seville and Córdoba.

A revolt broke out in Seville in 1391. Juan Alfonso de Guzmán, Count of Niebla and governor of the city, and his relative, the "alguazil mayor" Alvar Pérez de Guzmán, had ordered, on Ash Wednesday, 15 March, according to the source the arrest and public whipping of two of the mob-leaders. If that date had been Ash Wednesday, Easter would have fallen on 30 April, which is impossible in western Christianity. The fanatical mob, still further exasperated thereby, murdered and robbed several Jews and threatened the Guzmáns with death. In vain did the regency issue prompt orders; Ferrand Martínez continued unhindered his inflammatory appeals to the rabble to kill the Jews or baptize them. On 6 June the mob attacked the Judería of Seville from all sides and killed 4000 Jews; the rest submitted to baptism as the only means of escaping death."

"At this time Seville is said to have contained 7000 Jewish families. Of the three large synagogues existing in the city two were transformed into churches. In all the towns throughout the archbishopric, as in Alcalá de Guadeira, Écija, Cazalla, and in Fregenal de la Sierra, the Jews were robbed and slain. In Córdoba this butchery was repeated in a horrible manner; the entire Judería de Córdoba was burned down; factories and warehouses were destroyed by the flames. Before the authorities could come to the aid of the defenseless people, every one of them—children, young women, old men—had been ruthlessly slain; 2000 corpses lay in heaps in the streets, in the houses, and in the wrecked synagogues."

From Córdova the spirit of murder spread to Jaén. A horrible butchery took place in Toledo on June 20. Among the many martyrs were the descendants of the famous Toledan rabbi Asher ben Jehiel. Most of the Castilian communities suffered from the persecution; nor were the Jews of Aragon, Catalonia, or Majorca spared. On July 9, an outbreak occurred in Valencia. More than 200 persons were killed, and most of the Jews of that city were baptized by the friar Vicente Ferrer, whose presence in the city was probably not accidental. The only community remaining in the former kingdom of Valencia was that of Murviedro. On Aug. 2 the wave of murder visited Palma, in Majorca; 300 Jews were killed, and 800 found refuge in the fort, from which, with the permission of the governor of the island, and under cover of night, they sailed to North Africa; many submitted to baptism. Three days later, on Saturday, August 5, a riot began in Barcelona. On the first day, 100 Jews were killed, while several hundred found refuge in the new fort; on the following day the mob invaded the Juderia and began pillaging. The authorities did all in their power to protect the Jews, but the mob attacked them and freed those of its leaders who had been imprisoned. On Aug. 8 the citadel was stormed, and more than 300 Jews were murdered, among the slain being the only son of Ḥasdai Crescas. The riot raged in Barcelona until Aug. 10, and many Jews (though not 11,000 as claimed by some authorities) were baptized. On the last-named day began the attack upon the Juderia in Girona; several Jews were robbed and killed; many sought safety in flight and a few in baptism.

"The last town visited was Lérida (August 13). The Jews of this city vainly sought protection in the Alcázar; 75 were slain, and the rest were baptized; the latter transformed their synagogue into a church, in which they worshiped as Marranos."

Several responses bearing on the widespread persecution of Iberian Jewry between the years 1390 and 1391 can be found in contemporary Jewish sources, such as in the Responsa of Isaac ben Sheshet (1326–1408), and in the seminal writing of Gedaliah ibn Yahya ben Joseph, Shalshelet haQabbalah (written ca. 1586), as also in Abraham Zacuto's Sefer Yuḥasin, in Solomon ibn Verga's Shevaṭ Yehudah, as well as in a Letter written to the Jews of Avignon by Don Hasdai Crescas in the winter of 1391 concerning the events in Spain in the year 1391. The letter is dated 19 October 1391.

According to Don Hasdai Crescas, persecution against Jews began in earnest in Seville in 1391, on the 1st day of the lunar month Tammuz (June). From there the violence spread to Córdoba, and by the 17th day of the same lunar month, it had reached Toledo (then called by Jews after its Arabic name, Ṭulayṭulah). From there, the violence spread to Mallorca and by the 1st day of the lunar month Elul it had also reached the Jews of Barcelona in Catalonia, where the slain were estimated at two-hundred and fifty. So, too, many Jews who resided in the neighboring provinces of Lérida and Gironda and in the kingdom of València had been affected, as were also the Jews of al-Andalus, whereas many died a martyr's death, while others converted in order to save themselves.

== Incitement, disputations and anti-Jewish legislation (1391–1474) ==
The year 1391 forms a turning-point in the history of the Spanish Jews. The persecution was the immediate forerunner of the Inquisition, which, ninety years later, was introduced as a means of watching heresy and converted Jews. The number of those who had embraced Catholicism, in order to escape death, was very large – over half of Spain's Jews according to Joseph Pérez, 200,000 converts with only 100,000 openly practicing Jews remaining by 1410.; Jews of Baena, Montoro, Baeza, Úbeda, Andújar, Talavera, Maqueda, Huete, and Molina, and especially of Zaragoza, Barbastro, Calatayud, Huesca, and Manresa, had submitted to baptism. Among those baptized were several wealthy men and scholars who scoffed at their former coreligionists; some even, as Solomon ha-Levi, or Paul de Burgos (called also Paul de Santa Maria), and Joshua Lorqui, or Gerónimo de Santa Fe, became the bitterest enemies and persecutors of their former brethren.

After the bloody excesses of 1391 the popular hatred of the Jews continued unabated. The Cortes of Madrid and that of Valladolid (1405) mainly busied themselves with complaints against the Jews, so that Henry III found it necessary to prohibit the latter from practising usury and to limit the commercial intercourse between Jews and Catholics; he also reduced by one-half the claims held by Jewish creditors against Catholics. Indeed, the feeble and suffering king, the son of Leonora, who hated the Jews so deeply that she even refused to accept their money, showed no feelings of friendship toward them. Though on account of the taxes of which he was thereby deprived he regretted that many Jews had left the country and settled in Málaga, Almería, and Granada, where they were well treated by the Moors, and though shortly before his death he inflicted a fine of 24,000 doubloons on the city of Córdoba because of a riot that had taken place there (1406), during which the Jews had been plundered and many of them murdered, he prohibited the Jews from attiring themselves in the same manner as other Spaniards, and he insisted strictly on the wearing of the badge by those who had not been baptized.

Many of the Jews from Valencia, Catalonia and Aragon thronged to North Africa, particularly Algiers.

The forced conversions also possibly contributed to the resurgence of Kabbalah studies among the Jews of Spain in the early 15th century.

=== Anti-Jewish laws ===
At the Catholic preacher Ferrer's request a law consisting of twenty-four clauses, which had been drawn up by Paul of Burgos, né Solomon haLevi, was issued in January 1412 in the name of the child-king John II of Castile.

The object of this law was to reduce the Jews to poverty and to further humiliate them. They were ordered to live by themselves, in enclosed Juderías, and they were to repair, within eight days after the publication of the order, to the quarters assigned them under penalty of loss of property. They were prohibited from practising medicine, surgery, or chemistry (pharmacy) and from dealing in bread, wine, flour, meat, etc. They might not engage in handicrafts or trades of any kind, nor might they fill public offices, or act as money-brokers or agents. They were not allowed to hire Catholic servants, farmhands, lamplighters, or gravediggers; nor might they eat, drink, or bathe with Catholics, or hold intimate conversation (have sexual relations) with them, or visit them, or give them presents. Catholic women, married or unmarried, were forbidden to enter the Judería either by day or by night. The Jews were allowed no self-jurisdiction whatever, nor might they, without royal permission, levy taxes for communal purposes; they might not assume the title of "Don", carry arms, or trim beard or hair. Jewish women were required to wear plain, long mantles of coarse material reaching to the feet; and it was strictly forbidden for Jews to wear garments made of better material. On pain of loss of property and even of slavery, they were forbidden to leave the country, and any grandee or knight who protected or sheltered a fugitive Jew was punished with a fine of 150,000 maravedís for the first offense. These laws, which were rigidly enforced, any violation of them being punished with a fine of 300–2,000 maravedís and flagellation, were calculated to compel the Jews to embrace Catholicism.

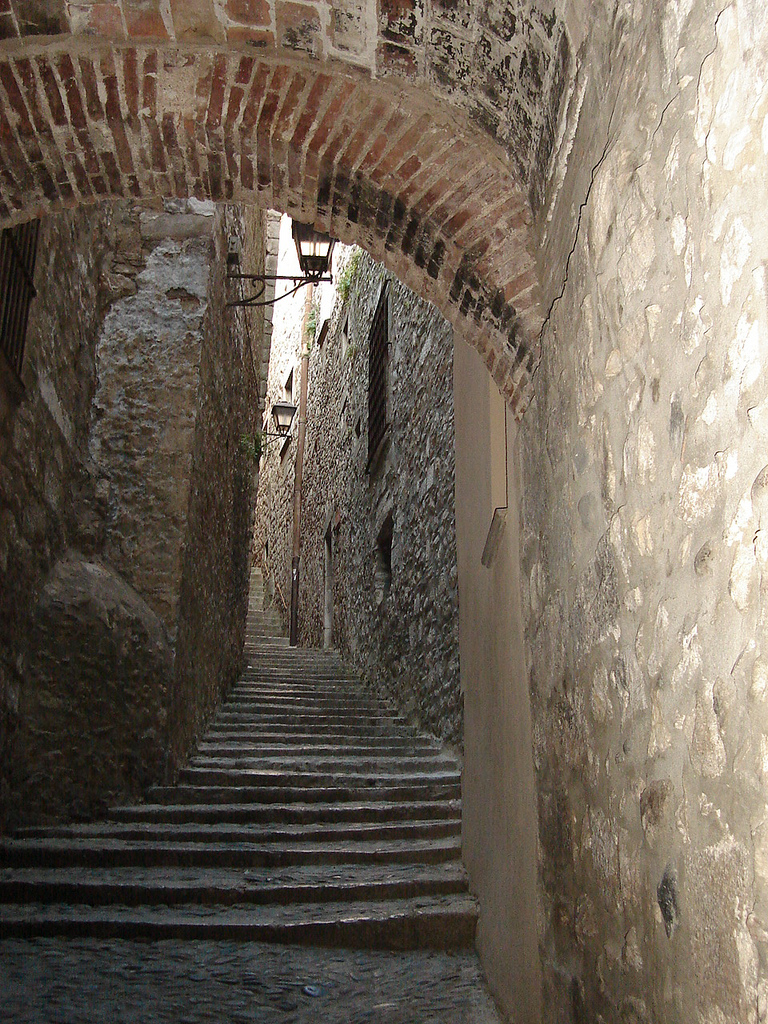
A lane in the old Jewish Quarter, called "El Call", of Girona, which includes the Girona Synagogue. Girona's Jewish community was lost as a result of the Expulsion.

The persecution of the Jews was now pursued systematically. In the hope of mass conversions, Benedict on 11 May 1415, issued a Papal bull consisting of twelve articles, which, in the main, corresponded with the decree ("Pragmática") issued by Catalina, and which had been placed on the statutes of Aragon by Fernando. By this bull Jews and neophytes were forbidden to study the Talmud, to read anti-Catholic writing, in particular the work "Macellum" ("Mar Jesu"), to pronounce the names of Jesus, Maria, or the saints, to manufacture communion-cups or other church vessels or accept such as pledges, or to build new synagogues or ornament old ones. Each community might have only one synagogue. Jews were denied all rights of self-jurisdiction, nor might they proceed against malsines (accusers). They might hold no public offices, nor might they follow any handicrafts, or act as brokers, matrimonial agents, physicians, apothecaries, or druggists. They were forbidden to bake or sell matzot, or to give them away; neither might they dispose of meat which they were prohibited from eating. They might have no intercourse (sex) with Catholics, nor might they disinherit their baptized children. They should wear the badge at all times, and thrice a year all Jews over twelve, of both sexes, were required to listen to a Catholic sermon. (the bull is reprinted, from a manuscript in the archives of the cathedral in Toledo, by Rios ["Hist." ii. 627–653]).

== Under the Catholic Monarchs (1474–1492) ==
In the 1470s, the Catholic Monarchs of Spain—Isabella I of Castile (who ascended the throne in 1474) and Ferdinand II of Aragon (in 1479)—rose to power and initiated the dynastic union that would lay the foundations for a unified Spanish monarchy. Contemporary sources record that upon Isabella's coronation in Ávila, she was welcomed by the city's Jewish community with Torah scrolls, trumpets, and drums. Later, when the monarchs entered Seville, they were again greeted with enthusiasm by the local Jewish population, in stark contrast to the insults Ferdinand received from Castilian Christians, who viewed him as a foreigner.

The crown soon adopted increasingly restrictive policies intending to the Jews both from the conversos and from their fellow countrymen. At the Cortes of Toledo, in 1480, all Jews were ordered to be separated in special barrios, and at the Cortes of Fraga, two years later, the same law was enforced in Navarre, where they were ordered to be confined to the Juderías at night. The same year saw the establishment of the Spanish Inquisition, the main object of which was to deal with the conversos. Though both monarchs were surrounded by Neo-Catholics, such as Pedro de Caballería and Luis de Santángel, and though Ferdinand was the grandson of a Jew, he showed the greatest intolerance to Jews, whether converted or otherwise, commanding all "conversos" to reconcile themselves with the Inquisition by the end of 1484, and obtaining a bull from Pope Innocent VIII ordering all Catholic princes to return all fugitive conversos to the Inquisition of Spain. One of the reasons for the increased rigor of the Catholic monarchs was the disappearance of the fear of any united action by Jews and Moors, the kingdom of Granada being at its last gasp. The rulers did, however, promise the Jews of the Moorish kingdom that they could continue to enjoy their existing rights in exchange for aiding the Spaniards to overthrow the Moors. This promise dated 11 February 1490, was repudiated, however, by the decree of expulsion. See the Catholic Monarchs of Spain.

The prohibitions, persecution and eventual Jewish mass emigration from Spain and Portugal probably had adverse effects on the development of the Spanish economy. Jews and Non-Catholic Christians reportedly had substantially better numerical skills than the Catholic majority, which might be due to the Jewish religious doctrine, which focused strongly on education, for example because Torah-Reading was compulsory. Even when Jews were forced to quit their highly skilled urban occupations, their numeracy advantage persisted. However, during the inquisition, spillover-effects of these skills were rare because of forced separation and Jewish emigration, which was detrimental for economic development.

In January 1483, likely with royal approval, the Inquisition ordered the expulsion of Jews from Andalusia. In the following years, several murder accusations were leveled against Jews. In 1485, the inquisitor Pedro de Arbués was assassinated at the cathedral of Zaragoza in a plot attributed primarily to conversos; Dozens were executed or punished, though records suggest some "old Christians" were also involved but largely escaped prosecution. Among the prosecuted conversos was Francisco de Santa Fe, a grandson of the well-known convert Gerónimo de Santa Fe, who committed suicide in prison; his body was burned and the ashes thrown into the river. The hands of some of the accused were cut off and nailed to the cathedral door before they were beheaded and quartered. In 1491, the infamous 'Holy Child of La Guardia' blood libel involved the false accusation of Jews and conversos for the ritual murder of a Christian child; confessions were extracted under torture, and all defendants were burned at the stake, despite no evidence that a child had disappeared.

=== Architecture ===
A small number of pre-expulsion synagogues survive, including the Synagogue of Santa María la Blanca and the Synagogue of El Tránsito in Toledo, the Córdoba Synagogue, the Híjar Synagogue, the Old main synagogue, Segovia, the Valencia de Alcántara Synagogue and the newly discovered Synagogue of Utrera.

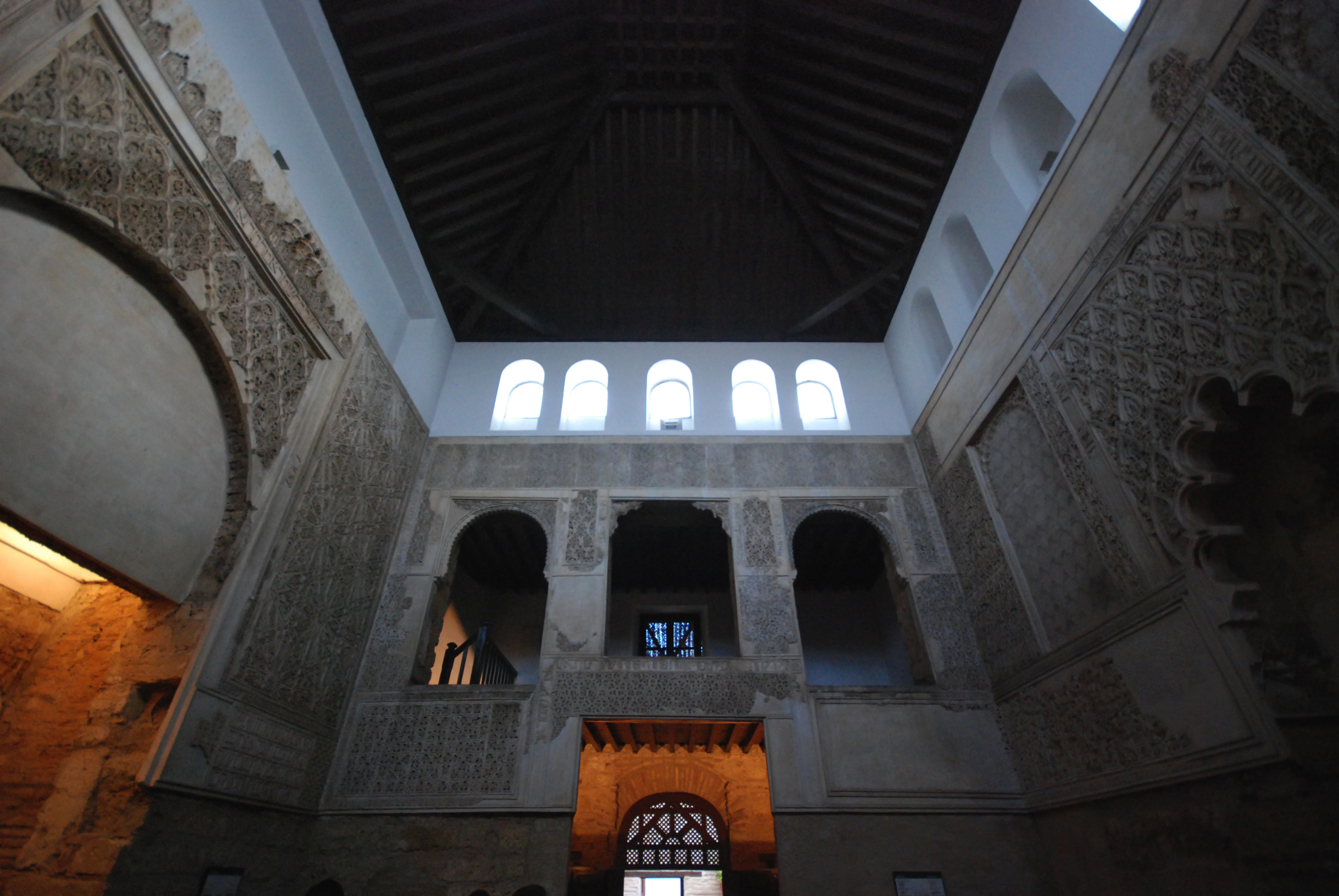
Córdoba Synagogue

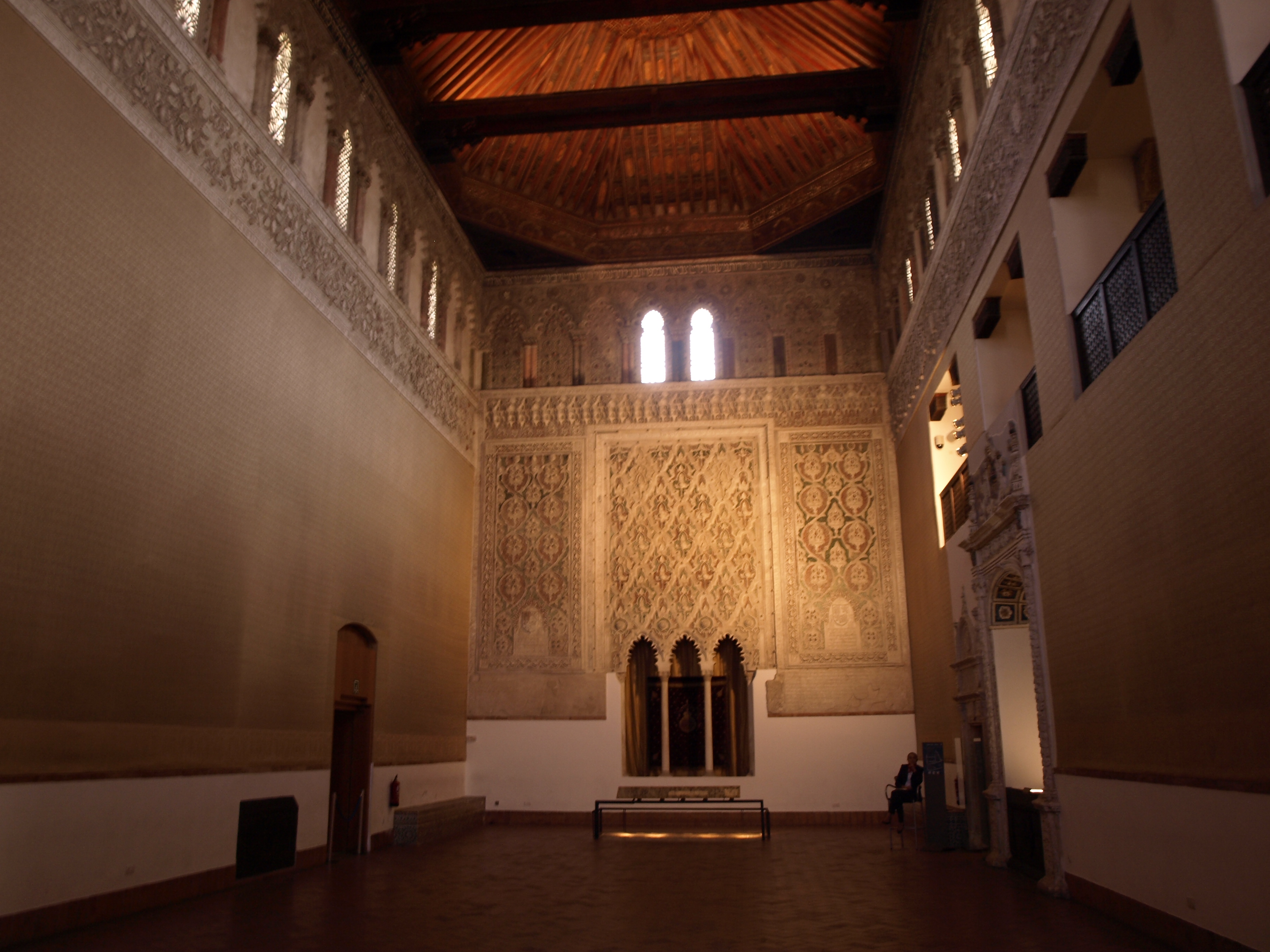
Synagogue of El Tránsito, Toledo

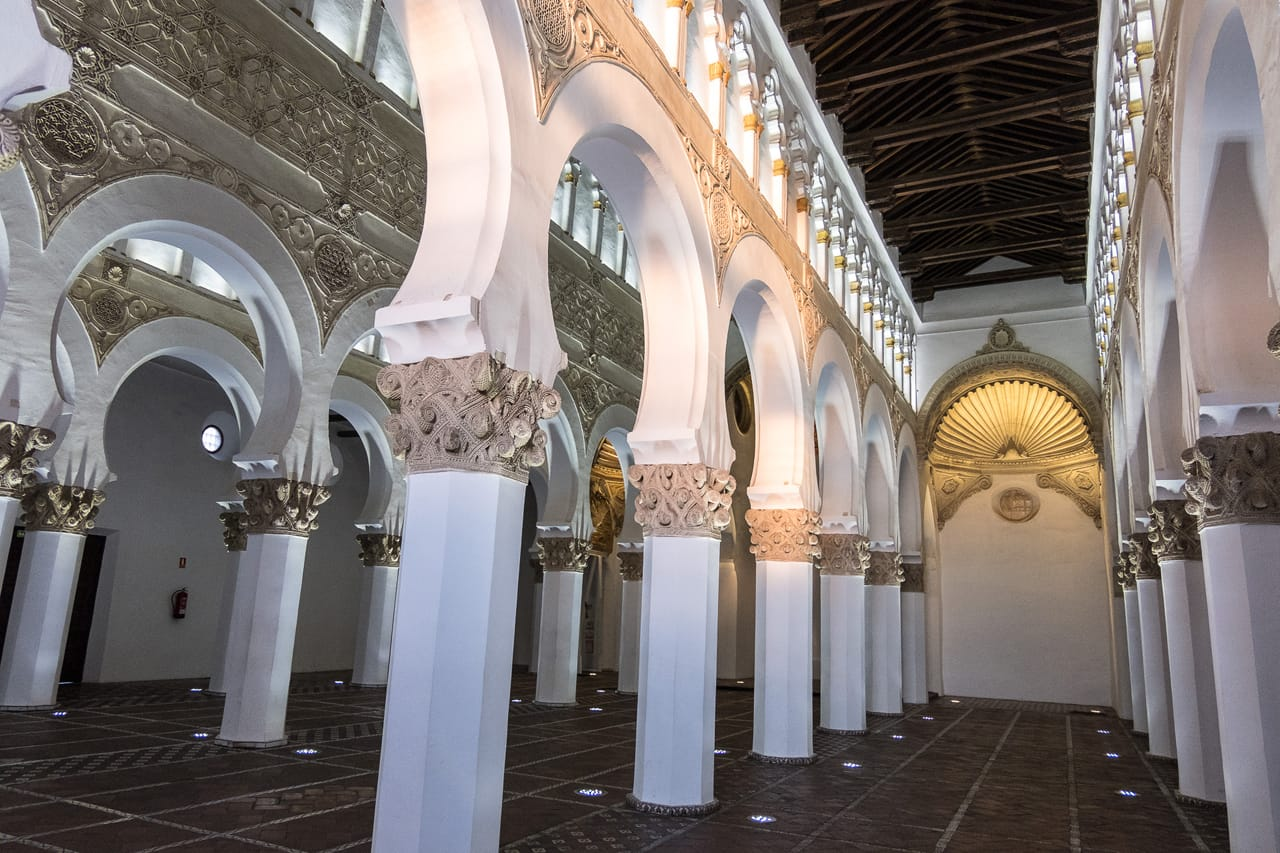
Synagogue of Santa María la Blanca, Toledo

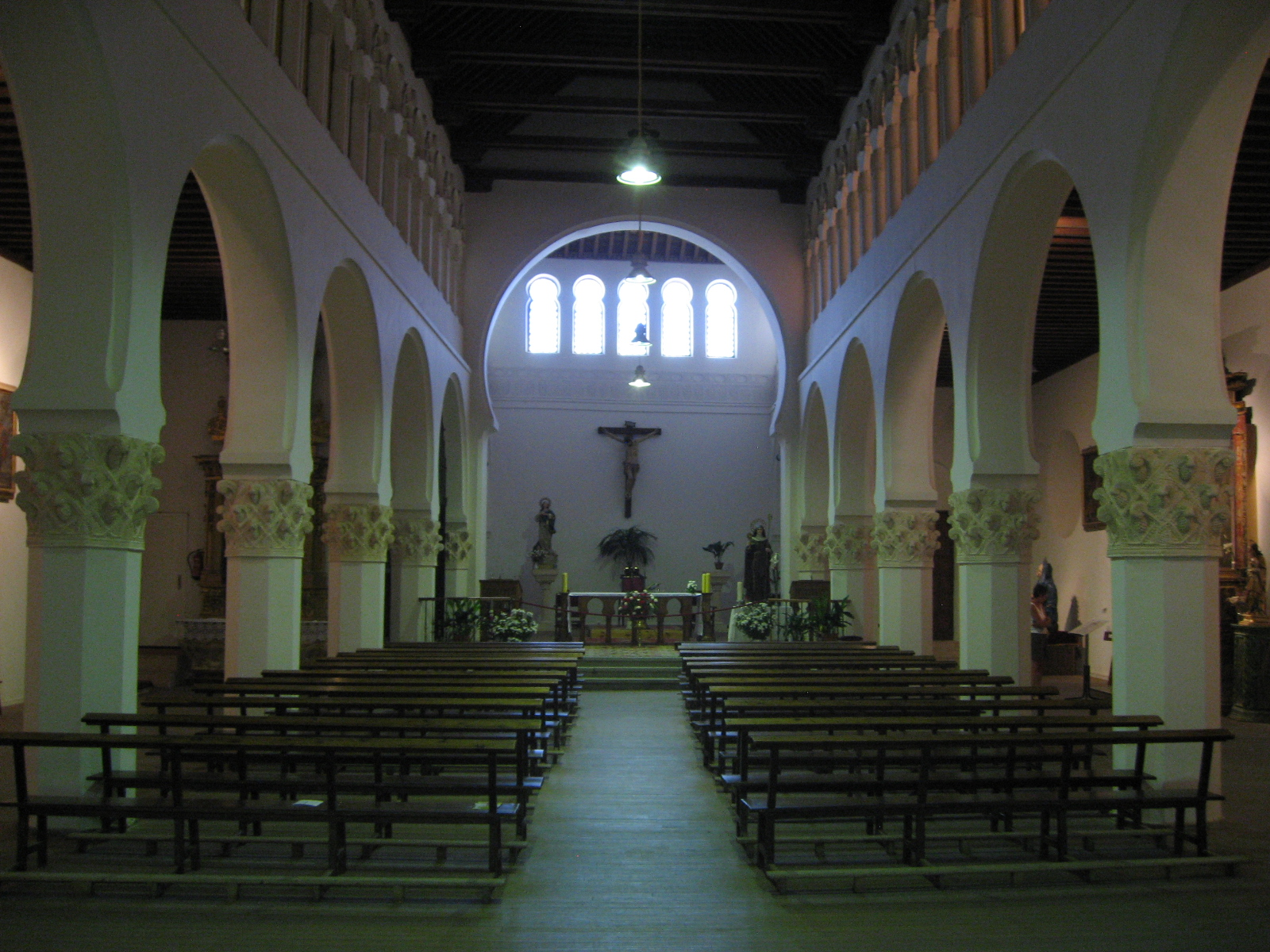
Old main synagogue, Segovia

== Edict of Expulsion (1492) ==
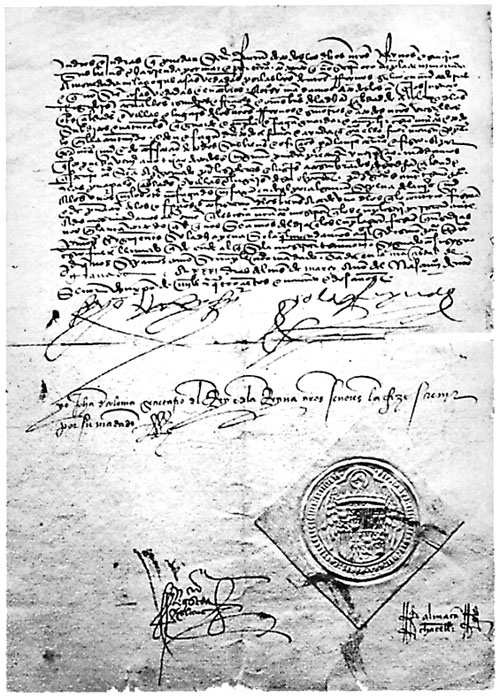
A signed copy of the Alhambra Decree

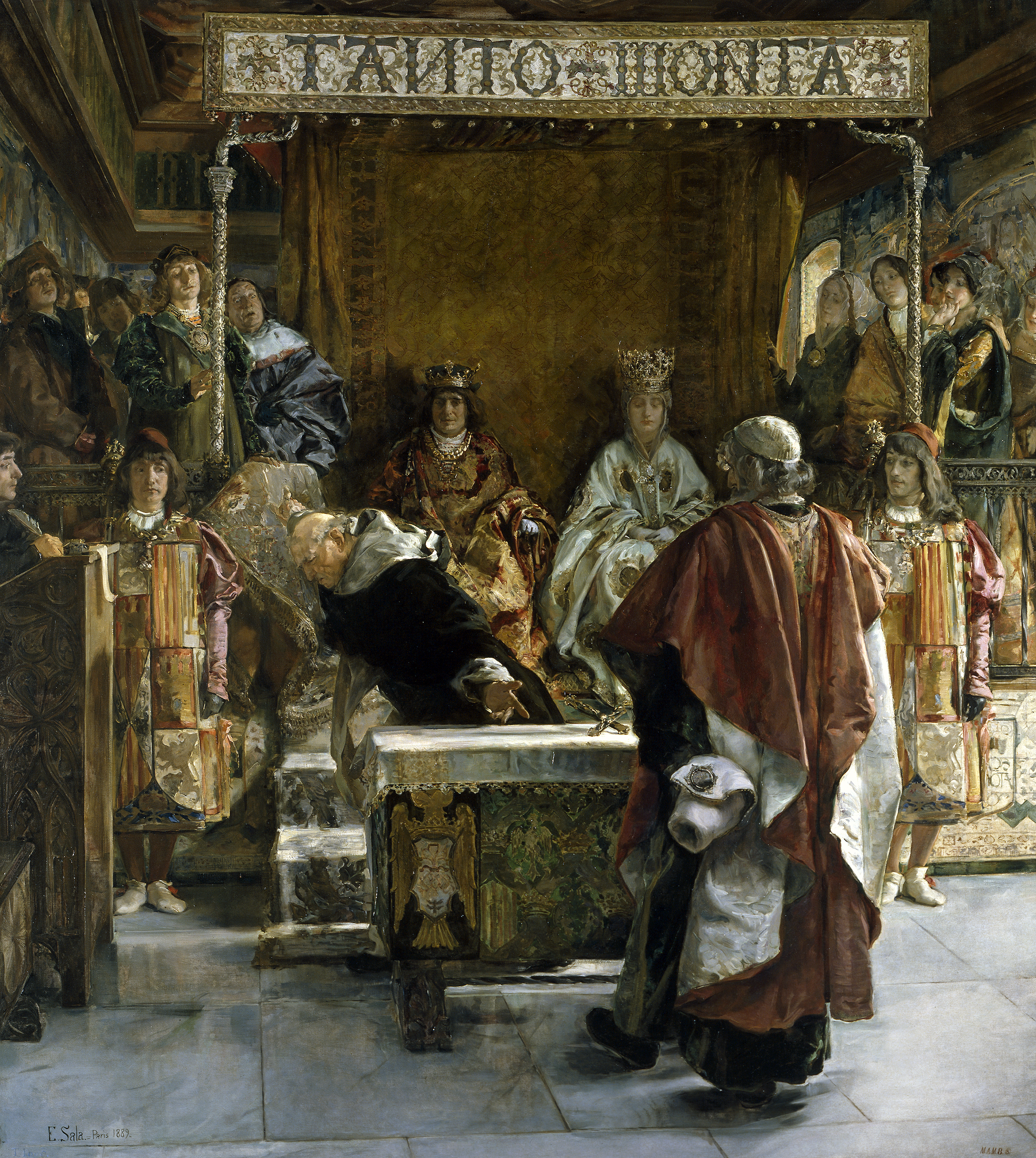
The Expulsion of the Jews from Spain (in the year 1492) by Emilio Sala Francés

Several months after the fall of Granada, an edict of expulsion called the Alhambra Decree was issued against the Jews of Spain by Ferdinand and Isabella on 31 March 1492. It ordered all Jews of whatever age to leave the kingdom by the last day of July: one day before Tisha B'Av. They were permitted to take their property provided it was not in gold, silver, or money.

The reason given for this action in the preamble of the edict was the relapse of so many conversos owing to the proximity of unconverted Jews, who seduced them from Christianity and kept alive in them the knowledge and practices of Judaism.

It is claimed that Isaac Abarbanel, who had previously ransomed 480 Jews of Málaga from the Catholic Monarchs by a payment of 20,000 doubloons, now offered them 600,000 crowns for the revocation of the edict. It is said also that Ferdinand hesitated, but was prevented from accepting the offer by Tomás de Torquemada, the grand inquisitor, who dashed into the royal presence and, throwing a crucifix down before the king and queen, asked whether, like Judas, they would betray their Lord for money. Torquemada was reputedly of converso ancestry, and the confessor of Isabella, Espina, was previously a Rabbi. Whatever the truth of this story, there were no signs of relaxation shown by the court, and the Jews of Spain made preparations for exile. In some cases, as at Vitoria, they took steps to prevent the desecration of the graves of their kindred by presenting the cemetery, called the Judimendi, to the municipality — a precaution not unjustified, as the Jewish cemetery of Seville was later ravaged by the people. The members of the Jewish community of Segovia passed the last three days of their stay in the city in the Jewish cemetery, fasting and wailing over being parted from their dead beloved.

=== Number of exiles ===
The number of Jews exiled from Spain is subject to controversy, with highly exaggerated figures provided by early observers and historians offering figures which numbered the hundreds of thousands. By the time of the expulsion, little more than 100,000 practicing Jews remained in Spain, since the majority had already converted to Catholicism. This in addition to the indeterminate number who managed to return has led recent academic investigations such as those of Joseph Pérez and Julio Valdeón to offer figures of somewhere between 50,000 and 80,000 practicing Jews expelled from Spanish territory.

=== European context of expulsions ===
Jewish expulsion is a well established trend in European history. From the 13th to the 16th century, at least 15 European countries expelled their Jewish populations. The expulsion of the Jews from Spain was preceded by expulsions from England, France and Germany, among many others, and succeeded by at least five more expulsions.

== Conversos ==
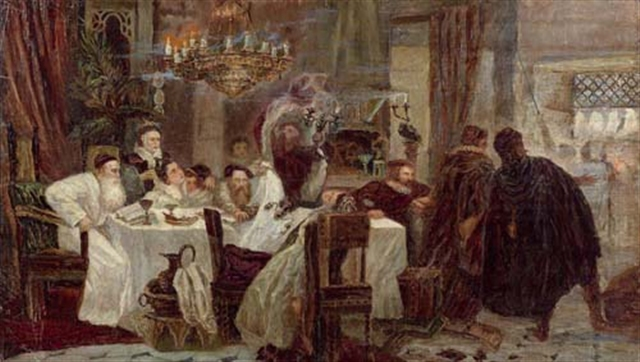
Marranos: Secret Seder in Spain during the times of inquisition, an 1892 painting by Moshe Maimon

Henceforth the history of the Jews in Spain is that of the conversos, whose numbers, as has been shown, had been increased by no less than 50,000 during the period of the expulsion to a possible total of 300,000. For three centuries after the expulsion, Spanish Conversos were subject to suspicion by the Spanish Inquisition, which executed over 3000 people in the 1570–1700 period on charges of heresy (including Judaism). They were also subject to more general discriminatory laws known as "limpieza de sangre" which required Spaniards to prove their "old Christian" background in order to access certain positions of authority. During this period hundreds of conversos escaped to nearby countries such as England, France and the Netherlands, or converted back to Judaism, thus becoming part of the communities of Western Sephardim or Spanish and Portuguese Jews.

Conversos played an important leadership role in the Revolt of the Comuneros (1520–1522), a popular revolt and civil war in the Crown of Castile against the imperial pretensions of Holy Roman Emperor Charles V.

Conversos played a prominent role in shaping Spanish intellectual and literary culture, particularly during the period commonly referred to as the "Spanish Golden Age". Their influence began to emerge as early as the fifteenth century, well before the height of this cultural flourishing. One of the most striking examples of this influence is the authorship of La Celestina, an 1499 book by Fernando de Rojas considered the first modern play in any language. Conversos were central contributors not only to poetry and fiction but also to historical chronicles, anti-Jewish polemics, philosophical texts, and other literary forms.

In the 15th century, chronicler Alonso de Palencia reported that many conversos in Andalusia continued to believe in the coming of the messiah, interpreting unusual natural events (such as the sighting of a whale off the coast near Setúbal, which they identified with the biblical sea monster Leviathan) as signs of its imminent arrival. However, it is unclear whether such beliefs referred to the Jewish messiah or to Christ's second coming.

== 1858 to the present ==
Small numbers of Jews started to arrive in Spain in the 19th century, and synagogues were opened in Madrid.

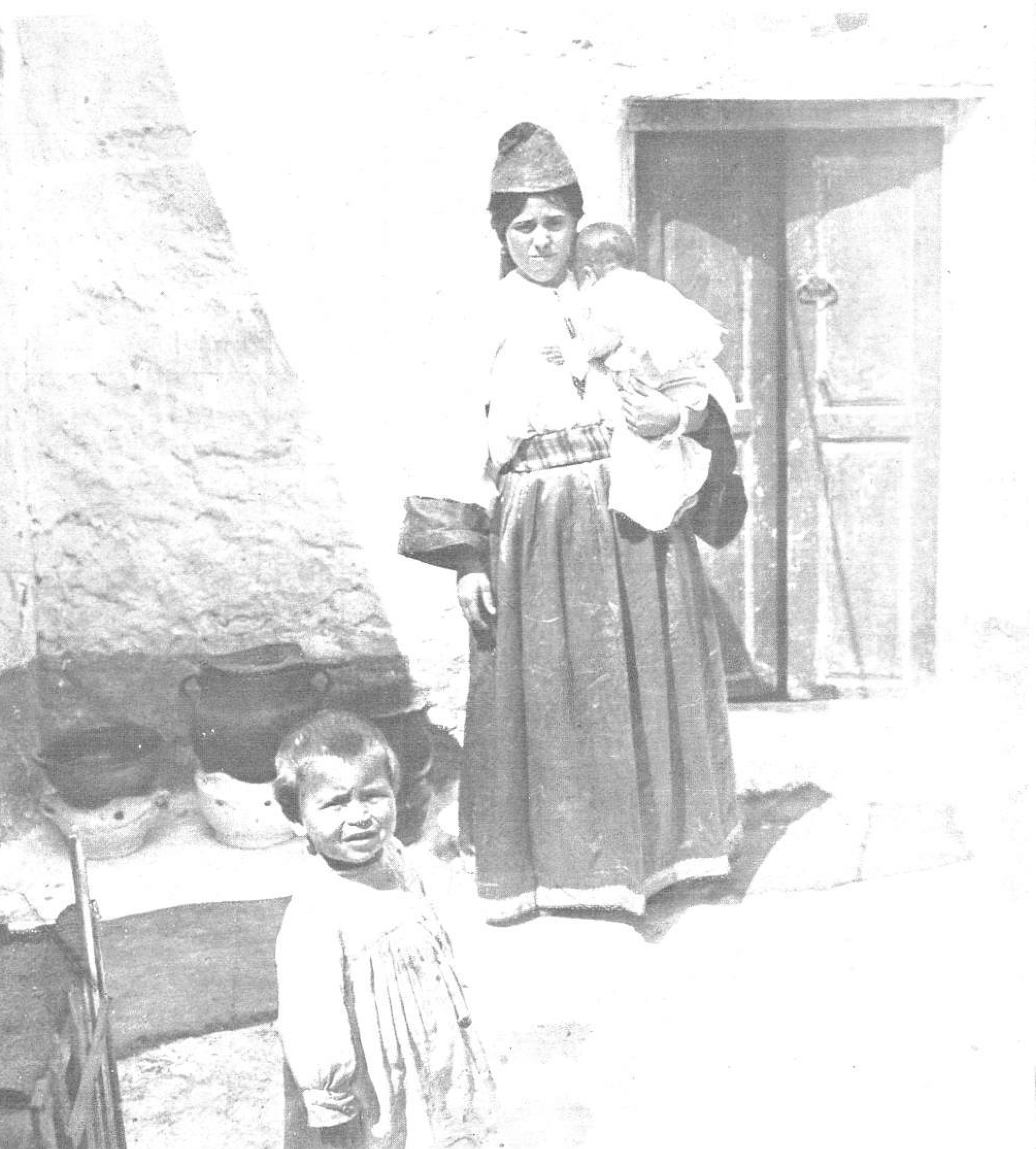
Jewish woman in the Jewish quarter of Melilla (1909).

By 1900, not taking Ceuta and Melilla into account, about 1,000 Jews lived in Spain.

Jews began to interact with Melilla as early as 1862, with an increasing Jewish community in the city throughout the early 20th century that grew upon the arrival of Moroccan Jews spurred on after the events of Taza under Bou Hmara, the 1909 Melillan Campaign, World War I, and the Rif War.

Spanish historians started to take an interest in the Sephardim and Judaeo-Spanish, their language. There was a Spanish rediscovery of the Jews of Northern Morocco who still conserved this language and practiced old Spanish customs.

The dictatorship of Miguel Primo de Rivera (1923–1930) decreed the right to Spanish citizenship to a certain number of Sephardim on 20 December 1924. The condition was that they had enjoyed Spanish protection before while living in the Ottoman Empire and that they applied before 31 December 1930. A similar measure was undertaken by the French government regarding non-Muslims in the Levant who had previously been protected by France. The decree especially addressed Jews from Thessaloniki who had refused to take either Greek or Turkish citizenship. The decree was later used by some Spanish diplomats to save Sephardi Jews from persecution and death during the Holocaust.

Prior to the Spanish Civil War and not taking Ceuta and Melilla into account, about 6,000–7,000 Jews lived in Spain, mostly in Barcelona and Madrid. Likewise, by 1936, the Jewish community in Melilla amounted to 6,000, later notably decreasing because of emigration to Venezuela, Israel, mainland Spain and France.

=== Spanish Civil War & World War II ===
During the Spanish Civil War (1936–1939), synagogues were closed and post-war worship was kept in private homes. Jewish public life resumed in 1947 with the arrival of Jews from Europe and North Africa.

In the first years of World War II, "Laws regulating their admittance were written and mostly ignored." They were mainly from Western Europe, fleeing deportation to concentration camps from occupied France, but also Jews from Eastern Europe, especially Hungary. Trudi Alexy refers to the "absurdity" and "paradox of refugees fleeing the Nazis' Final Solution to seek asylum in a country where no Jews had been allowed to live openly as Jews for over four centuries."

Throughout World War II, Spanish diplomats of the Franco government extended their protection to Eastern European Jews, especially Hungary. Jews claiming Spanish ancestry were provided with Spanish documentation without being required to prove their case and either left for Spain or survived the war with the help of their new legal status in occupied countries.

Once the tide of war began to turn, and Count Francisco Gómez-Jordana Sousa succeeded Franco's brother-in-law Ramón Serrano Suñer as Spain's foreign minister, Spanish diplomacy became "more sympathetic to Jews", although Franco himself "never said anything" about this. Around that same time, a contingent of Spanish doctors travelling in Occupied Poland were fully informed of the Nazi extermination plans by Governor-General Hans Frank, who was under the impression that they would share his views about the matter; when they came home, they passed the story to Admiral Luís Carrero Blanco, who told Franco.

Diplomats discussed the possibility of Spain as a route to a containment camp for Jewish refugees near Casablanca but it came to naught due to lack of Free French and British support. Nonetheless, control of the Spanish border with France relaxed somewhat at this time, and thousands of Jews managed to cross into Spain (many by smugglers' routes). Almost all of them survived the war. The American Jewish Joint Distribution Committee operated openly in Barcelona.

Shortly afterward, Spain began giving citizenship to Sephardi Jews in Greece, Hungary, Bulgaria, and Romania; many Ashkenazi Jews also managed to be included, as did some non-Jews. The Spanish head of mission in Budapest, Ángel Sanz Briz, saved thousands of Ashkenazim in Hungary by granting them Spanish citizenship, placing them in safe houses and teaching them minimal Spanish so they could pretend to be Sephardim, at least to someone who did not know Spanish. The Spanish diplomatic corps was performing a balancing act: Alexy conjectures that the number of Jews they took in was limited by how much German hostility they were willing to engender.

Toward the war's end, Sanz Briz had to flee Budapest, leaving these Jews open to arrest and deportation. An Italian diplomat, Giorgio Perlasca, who was himself living under Spanish protection, used forged documents to persuade the Hungarian authorities that he was the new Spanish Ambassador. As such, he continued Spanish protection of Hungarian Jews until the Red Army arrived.

Although Spain effectively undertook more to help Jews escape deportation to the concentration camps than most neutral countries did, there has been debate about Spain's wartime attitude towards refugees. Franco's regime, despite its aversion to Zionism and "Judeo-Marxist"-Freemasonry conspiracy, does not appear to have shared the rabid antisemitic ideology promoted by the Nazis. About 25,000 to 35,000 refugees, mainly Jews, were allowed to transit through Spain to Portugal and beyond.

Some historians argue that these facts demonstrate a humane attitude by Franco's regime, while others point out that the regime only permitted Jewish transit through Spain. After the war, Franco's regime was quite hospitable to those who had been responsible for the deportation of the Jews, notably Louis Darquier de Pellepoix, Commissioner for Jewish Affairs (May 1942 – February 1944) in Vichy France, and to many other former Nazis, such as Otto Skorzeny and Léon Degrelle, and other former Fascists.

José María Finat y Escrivá de Romaní, Franco's chief of security, issued an official order dated 13 May 1941 to all provincial governors requesting a list of all Jews, both local and foreign, present in their districts. After the list of six thousand names was compiled, Romani was appointed Spain's ambassador to Germany, enabling him to deliver it personally to Heinrich Himmler. Following the defeat of Germany in 1945, the Spanish government attempted to destroy all evidence of cooperation with the Nazis, but this official order survived. A Jewish newspaper cited a report published 22 June 2010 in the Spanish daily El País.

At around the same time, synagogues were opened and the communities could hold a discreet degree of activity.

On 29 December 1948, the official state bulletin (BOE) published a list of Sefardím family surnames from Greece and Egypt to which a special protection should be granted.

The Alhambra Decree that had expelled the Jews were formally rescinded on 16 December 1968.

Between 1948, the year Israel was founded, and 2010, 1,747 Spanish Jews made aliyah to Israel.

=== Modern Jewish community ===
There are currently around 50,000 Spanish Jews, with the largest communities in Barcelona and Madrid each with around 3,500 members. There are smaller communities in Alicante, Málaga, Tenerife, Granada, Valencia, Benidorm, Cádiz, Murcia and many more.

Barcelona, with a Jewish community of 3,500, has the largest concentration of Jews in Spain. Melilla on the African continent maintains an old community of Sephardic Jews. The city of Murcia in the southeast of the country has a growing Jewish community and a local synagogue. Kosher olives are produced in this region and exported to Jews around the world. Also there is a new Jewish school in Murcia as a result of the growth in Jewish population immigrating to the Murcia community PolarisWorld.

The modern Jewish community in Spain consists mainly of Sephardim from Northern Africa, especially the former Spanish colonies. In the 1970s, there was also an influx of Argentine Jews, mainly Ashkenazim, escaping from the military junta. With the birth of the European community, Jews from other countries in Europe moved to Spain because of its weather, lifestyle as well as for its cost of living relative to the north of Europe. Some Jews see Spain as an easier life for retirees and for young people. Mazarron has seen its Jewish community grow as well as La Manga, Cartagena and Alicante.

Moreover, Reform and liberal communities have arisen in cities like Barcelona or Oviedo during the last decade.

Some famous Spaniards of Jewish descent are the businesswomen Alicia and Esther Koplowitz, the politician Enrique Múgica Herzog, and Isak Andic, founder of the clothing design and manufacturing company Mango, though only the latter is of Sephardic origin.

There are rare cases of Jewish converts, like the writer Jon Juaristi. Today there is an interest by some Jewish groups working in Spain to encourage the descendants of Conversos to return to Judaism. This has resulted in a limited number of conversions to the Jewish faith.

Like other religious communities in Spain, the Federation of Jewish Communities of Spain (FCJE) has established agreements with the Spanish government, regulating the status of Jewish clergy, places of worship, teaching, marriages, holidays, tax benefits, and heritage conservation.

In 2014, residents of a village in Spain called Castrillo Matajudios voted to change the name of their town due to risk of confusion resulting from the etymology of the name. "Mata" is a common suffix of placenames in Spain, meaning "forested patch". In this case, it is likely to be a corruption of "mota" meaning "hill". Confusion arises from the word "mata" also meaning "kill", thus rendering a name that could be interpreted as "kill the jews". The name was changed back to its earlier name which would be less subject to surprise by newcomers Castrillo Mota de Judíos (Castrillo Hill of the Jews). Although a mere anecdote in Spain, where it barely made the national press, this story was widely covered in the English speaking press of the United States, United Kingdom and Israel, often misrepresenting the name of the village as "Camp Kill the Jews".

In 2020, Spain's parliament adopted the Working definition of antisemitism.

=== 2014–2019 citizenship law ===
In 2014 it was announced that the descendants of Sephardic Jews who were expelled from Spain by the Alhambra Decree of 1492 would be offered Spanish citizenship, without being required to move to Spain and/or renounce any other citizenship they may have. The law lapsed on 1 October 2019, and by that point the justice ministry claimed to have received 132,226 applications and approved 1,500 applicants. In order to be approved applicants needed to take "tests in Spanish language and culture ... prove their Sephardic heritage, establish or prove a special connection with Spain, and then pay a designated notary to certify their documents." Most applications came from nationals of countries with high levels of insecurity and violence in Latin America (mainly Mexico, Colombia and Venezuela).

== See also ==
- Israel–Spain relations
- History of the Jews in Portugal
- History of the Jews under Muslim rule
- Jacob ibn Jau
- Jewish community of Calatayud
- Antisemitism in Spain
- Samuel Toledano
- Sephardic law and customs
- Jews of Catalonia
- Portuguese Inquisition
- Pallache family
