= Vicente Cutanda =

Spanish painter (1850–1925)

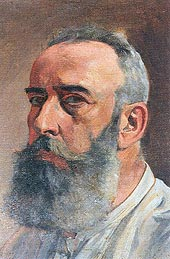
Self-portrait (date unknown)

Vicente Cutanda y Toraya (1850, Cella or Madrid - 1925, Toledo) was a Spanish painter and watercolorist. He is best known for historical scenes and social realist depictions of the lives of working people. One of his favorite places to find subjects for those works was in the Basque country of Biscay.

== Biography ==
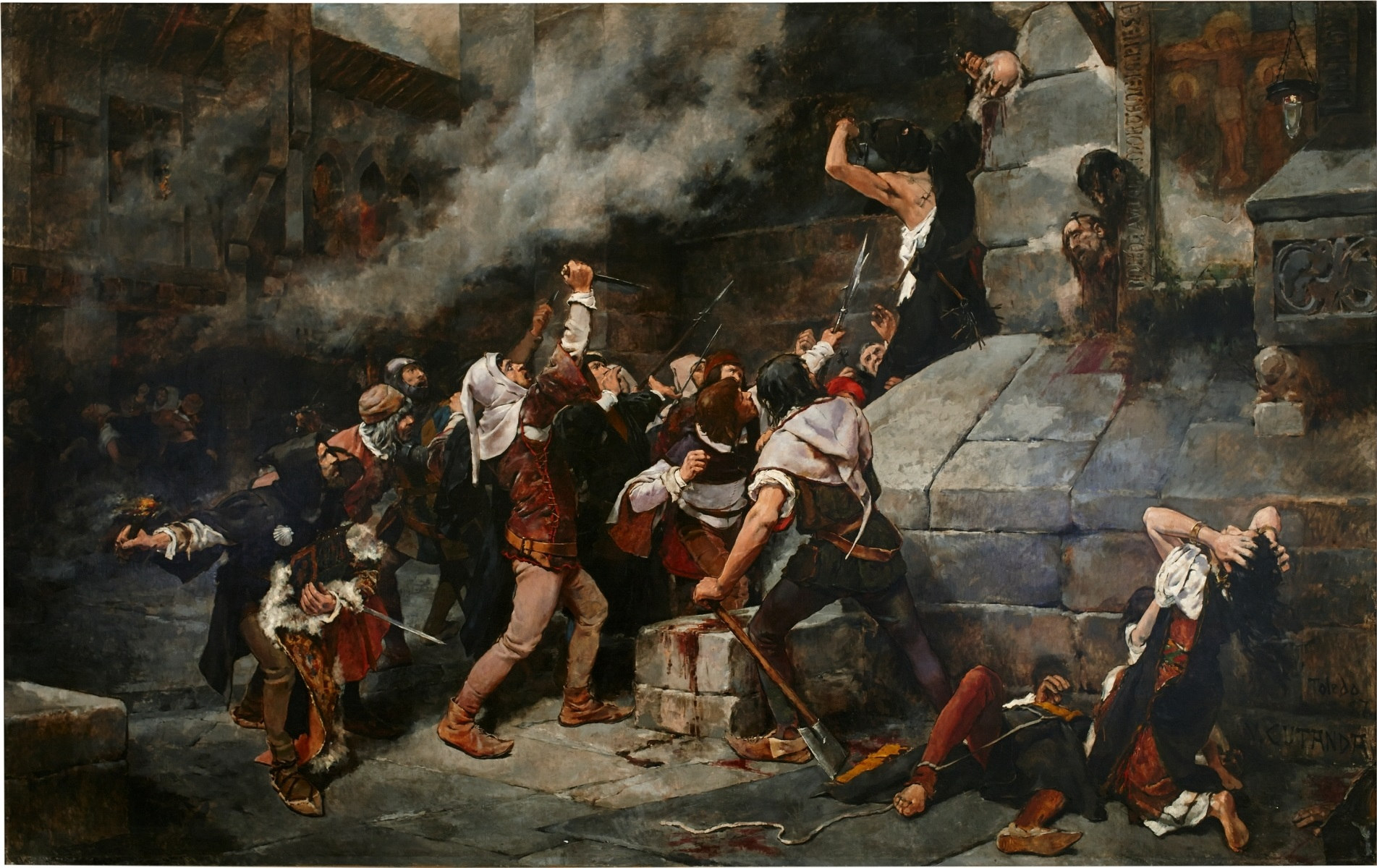
At the Feet of the Savior, massacre of Jews in Toledo, oil on canvas

He was the only child of Vicente Cutanda y Jarauta, a noted botanist. Throughout most of his childhood, he suffered from a nervous disorder that affected his eyesight. He originally studied architecture, but quit to study painting at the Real Academia de Bellas Artes de San Fernando. There, he was influenced by the works of Eduardo Rosales.

When he first arrived in Toledo, he received a number of commissions for religious paintings. In 1884, he became a Professor of Drawing at the Sociedad Cooperativa de Obreros de Toledo (Co-operative Workers' Society) and was able to marry his childhood sweetheart, Luisa Salazar.

Through his long-standing friendship with the painter, Ricardo Arredondo Calmache, he was led to abandon his preference for works in the style of Rosales and turned to social realism. This tendency was heightened by a stay in Italy, at the Regio Istituto delle Belle Arti de Roma, supported by a hard-won scholarship. It was fully confirmed when Rerum novarum, a Papal encyclical on the condition of the working classes, was issued in 1891.

At the National Exhibition of Fine Arts in 1887, he had been awarded a Third Class prize for his painting, "At the Feet of the Savior". Five years later, he was honored with a First Class prize for "A Workers' Strike in Vizcaya", his first major work in social realist style.

In 1900, he was named a Professor of Drawing at the Instituto General y Técnico de Segovia. From 1903 to 1904, he was Director of the Escuela de Artes y Oficios de Logroño (School of Arts and Crafts). When he returned to Toledo, he became the Professor of "Special studies of drawing and decorative composition" at the Escuela Superior de Artes Industriales.

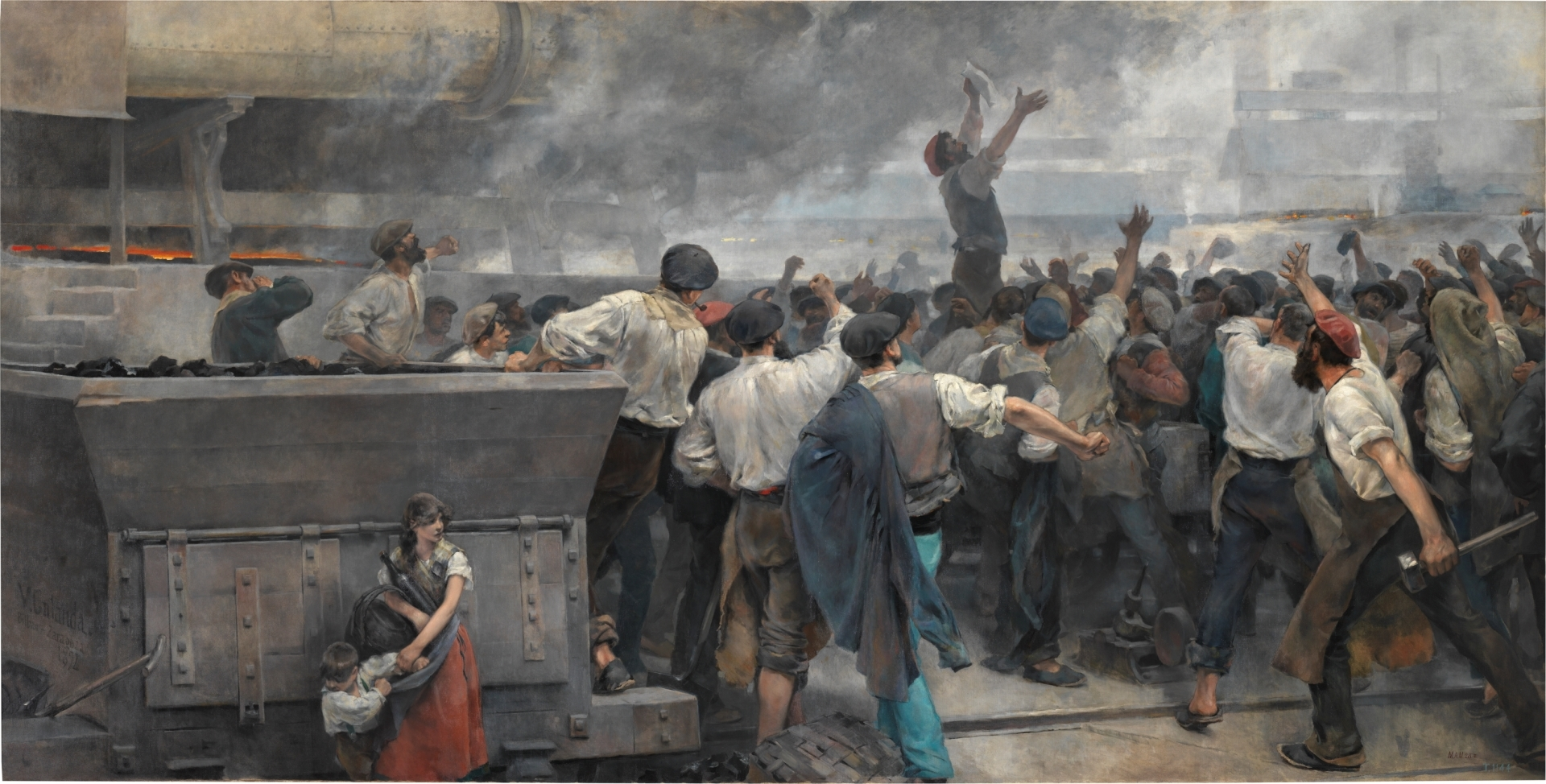
A Workers' Strike in Vizcaya

He later became a corresponding member of the Real Academia de Bellas Artes y Ciencias Históricas de Toledo. He was also active on the Monuments Commission and did restorative work. During the last three decades of his life, he provided illustrations for magazines such as La Ilustración Artística and Blanco y Negro.
