= José Patiño =

Spanish statesman (1666–1736)

The Most Excellent José Patiño
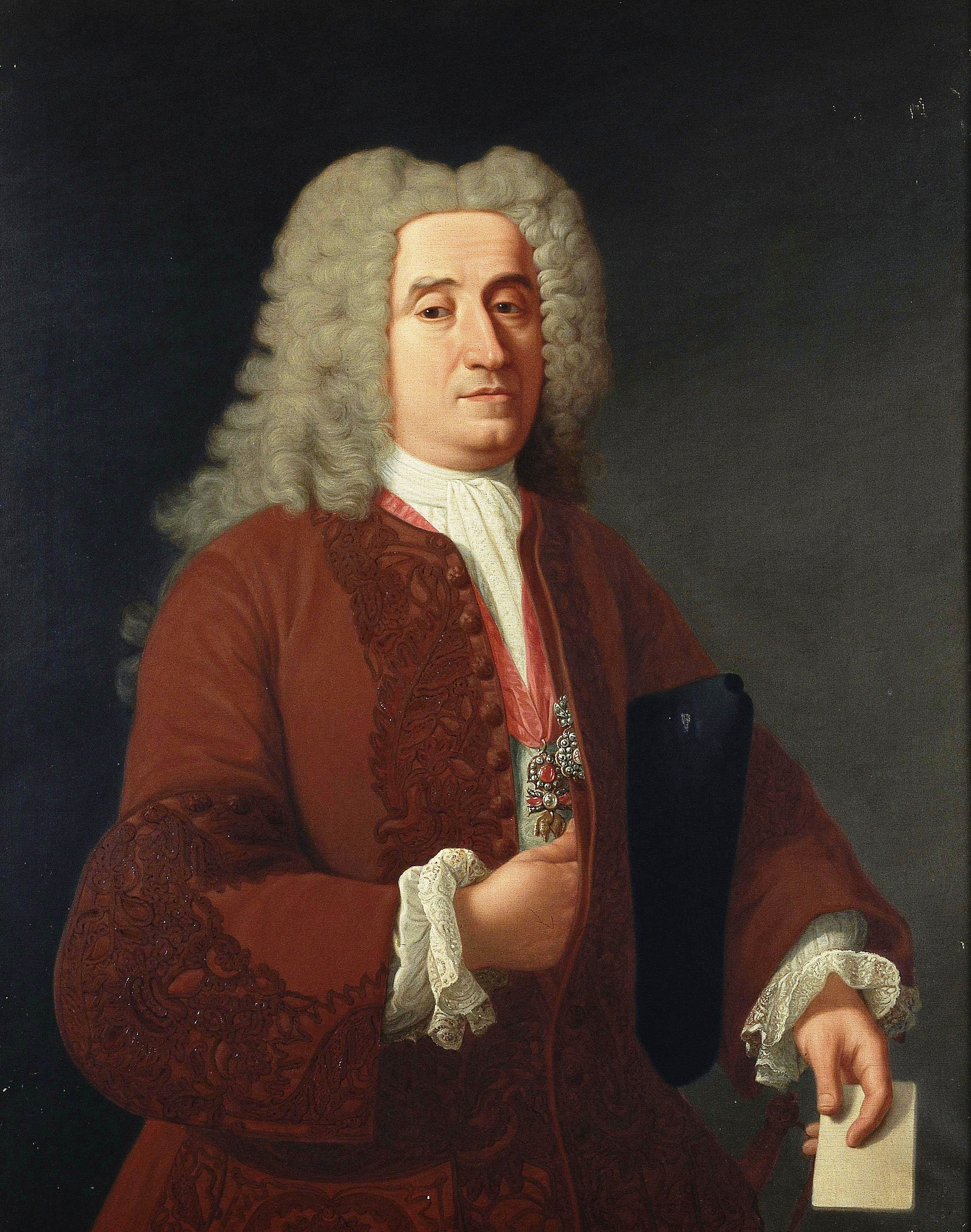

First Secretary of State of Spain
- In office 21 November 1734 – 3 November 1736
- Monarch: Philip V
- Preceded by: The Marquess of the Peace
- Succeeded by: The Marquis of Villarías

Secretary of State for Treasury of Spain
- In office 3 November 1726 – 3 November 1736
- Monarch: Philip V
- First Secretary of State: Marquess of the Peace; Himself
- Preceded by: Juan Bautista de Orendáin y Azpilicueta
- Succeeded by: Mateo Pablo Díaz de Lavandero

Secretary of State for War of Spain
- In office 5 September 1730 – 3 November 1736
- Monarch: Philip V
- First Secretary of State: Marquess of the Peace; Himself
- Preceded by: Baltasar Patiño y Rosales
- Succeeded by: Marquess of Villarías

Secretarty of State for Navy and Indies of Spain
- In office 21 May 1726 – 3 November 1736
- Monarch: Philip V
- First Secretary of State: José de Grimaldo; Marquess of the Peace y Azpiculueta; Himself
- Preceded by: Antonio de Sopeña y Mioño
- Succeeded by: Mateo Pablo Díaz de Lavandero

Personal details
- Born: José Patiño y Rosales

Don José Patiño y Rosales (11 April 1666 – 3 November 1736) was a Spanish statesman who served as acting First Secretary of State of Spain from 1734 to 1736.

== Life ==
His father, Don Lucas Patiño de Ibarra, Señor de Castelar, who was by origin a Galician, was a member of the privy council and inspector of the troops in the Duchy of Milan for the king of Spain, to whom it then belonged. His mother's maiden name was Beatrice de Rosales y Facini. Patiño was born in Milan.

The Patiño family were strong supporters of the Bourbon dynasty in the War of the Spanish Succession. The elder brother Baltasar, afterwards Marquis of Castelar, had a distinguished career as a diplomat, and his son Lucas was a general of some note. José Patiño, who had been intended for the priesthood but adopted a secular career, was granted the reversion of a seat in the Senate of Milan on the accession of Philip V in 1700, but on the loss of the duchy, he was transferred to Spain and put on the governing body of the military orders in 1707.

During the War of Succession he served as intendant of Extremadura, and then of Catalonia from 1711 to 1718. In 1717 he was named intendant of the navy, which had just been reorganized on the French model. His capacity and his faculty for hard work secured him the approval of Giulio Alberoni, with whom, however, he was never on very friendly terms in private life. Patiño's Italian education, which affected his Spanish style, and caused him to fall into Italianisms all through his life, may have served to recommend him still further.

Patiño profoundly distrusted the reckless foreign policy undertaken by Alberoni under the instigation of the king and his obstinate queen, Elizabeth Farnese. He foretold that it would lead to disaster, but as a public servant he could only obey orders, and he had the chief merit of organizing the various expeditions sent out to Sardinia, Sicily and Ceuta between 1718 and 1720. He became known to the king and queen in the latter year, while he was acting as a species of commissary-general during the disastrous operations against the French troops on the frontier of Navarre in the War of the Quadruple Alliance.

It was not, however, until 1726 that he was fully trusted by the king. He and his brother, the marquis of Castelar, were the chief opponents of the adventurer Ripperda, who captivated the king and queen for a time. On the fall of this remarkable person, Patiño was named secretary for the navy, the Indies—that is to say the colonies—and for foreign affairs. The war office was added to the other departments at a later date.

From 13 May 1726 until his death Patiño was, in fact, prime minister. During the later part of his administration he was much engaged in the laborious negotiations with Great Britain in relation to the disputes between the two countries over their commercial and colonial rivalries in America, which after his death led to the outbreak of the War of Jenkins' Ear in 1739.

In 1735 he also started a war with Portugal to retake the Banda Oriental in South America from the Portuguese.

In his Patiño y Campillo (Madrid, 1882), Don Antonio Rodríquez Villa has collected the dates of the statesman's life, and has published some valuable papers. But the best account of Patiños administration is to be found in William Coxe's Memoirs of the Kings of Spain of the House of Bourbon (London, 1815), which is founded on the correspondence of British diplomats at Madrid.

Political offices
Preceded by Juan Bautista de Orendáin	First Secretary of State; 1734–1736	Succeeded by Sebastián de la Cuadra
