= Sebastián de la Cuadra, 1st Marquess of Villarías =

The Most Excellent The Marquess of Villarías KOS OSJ
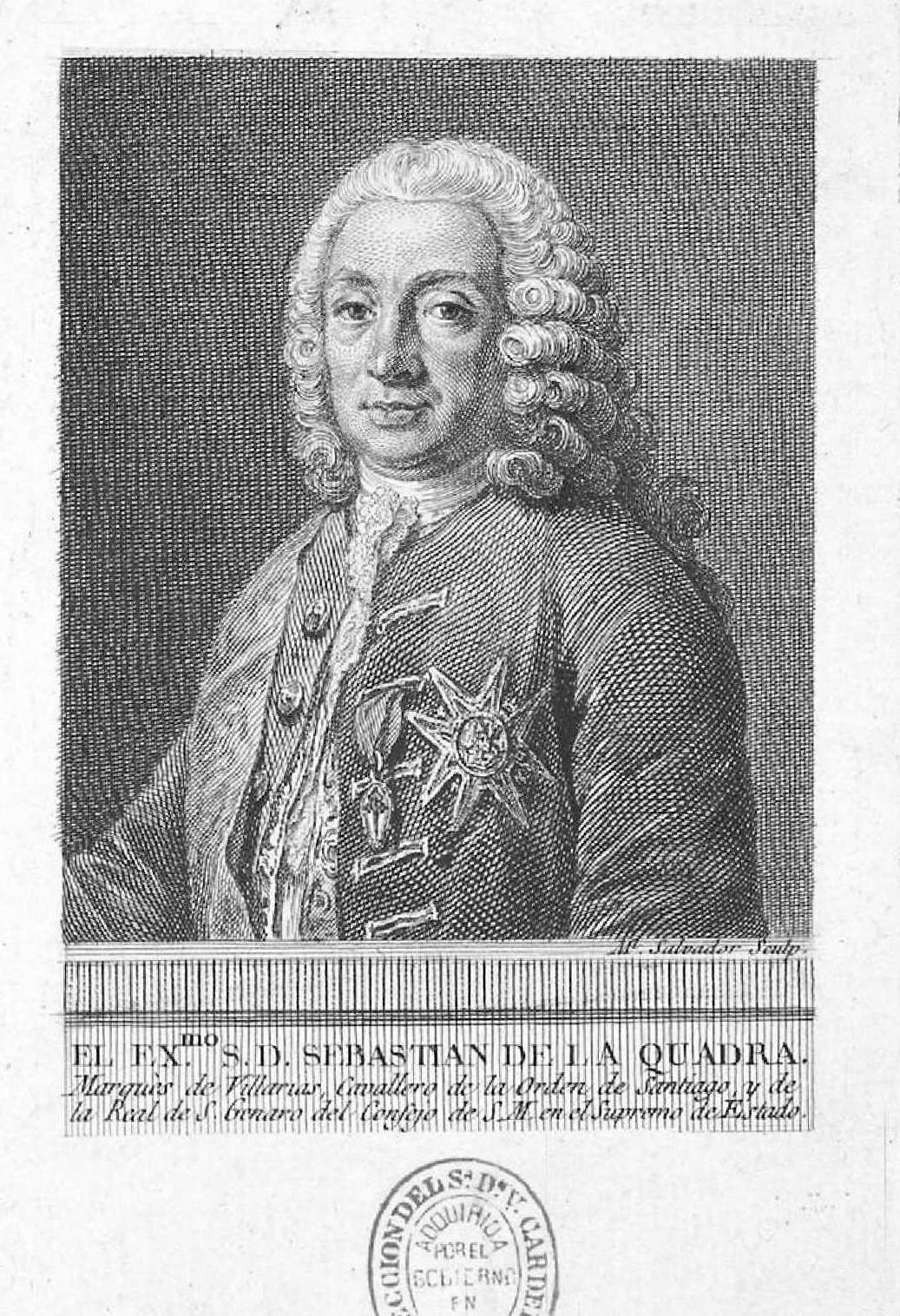

First Secretary of Spain
- In office 26 November 1736 – 4 December 1746
- Monarchs: Philip V Ferdinand VI
- Preceded by: José Patiño
- Succeeded by: José de Carvajal

Personal details
- Born: 19 January 1687 San Julián de Musques, Spain
- Died: 23 April 1766 (aged 79) Madrid, Spain

Sebastián de la Cuadra y Llarena, 1st Marquess of Villarías (19 January 1687 – 23 April 1766) was a Spanish statesman. He served as Chief Minister between 1736 and 1746 during the reign of Philip V of Spain.

He was the third son of Simón de la Quadra y Medrano, Síndico General of the Comarca of Las Encartaciones. In 1700, he moved to Madrid, where he was a protégé of future Secretary of State José de Grimaldo. He became in 1719 Mayor of Muskiz, a Basque town exploiting iron ores and local smelters, having two himself, one working as early as the 15th century. But he remained in Madrid and was represented in Muskiz by his brother Agustin. He became a Knight of the Military Order of Santiago in 1730 (sig. 2239) and Oficial Mayor to the Secretary of State in 1731.

In 1736 he became himself First Secretary of State, when José Patiño died. From 1741 he also controlled the Justice Department. For much of this late period in office, Spain was involved in the War of Jenkins' Ear with Britain and the War of the Austrian Succession in Italy. He was replaced by José de Carvajal y Lancáster in December 1746. For his service he was made Marqués de Villarías by King Philip V of Spain on 22 March 1739, an honour awarded sometimes either to outgoing First Ministers or during their tenure.

He was a co-founder of the Real Academia de Bellas Artes de San Fernando in 1744.

== Character ==
Sebastián de la Cuadra was of a quiet and discrete nature. He was very religious and never married. He had a large network to gather all necessary information to serve the King and even more the Queen.
The British Ambassador Benjamin Keene didn't hold him in high regards, and the Queen treated him as a servant.

== Family ==
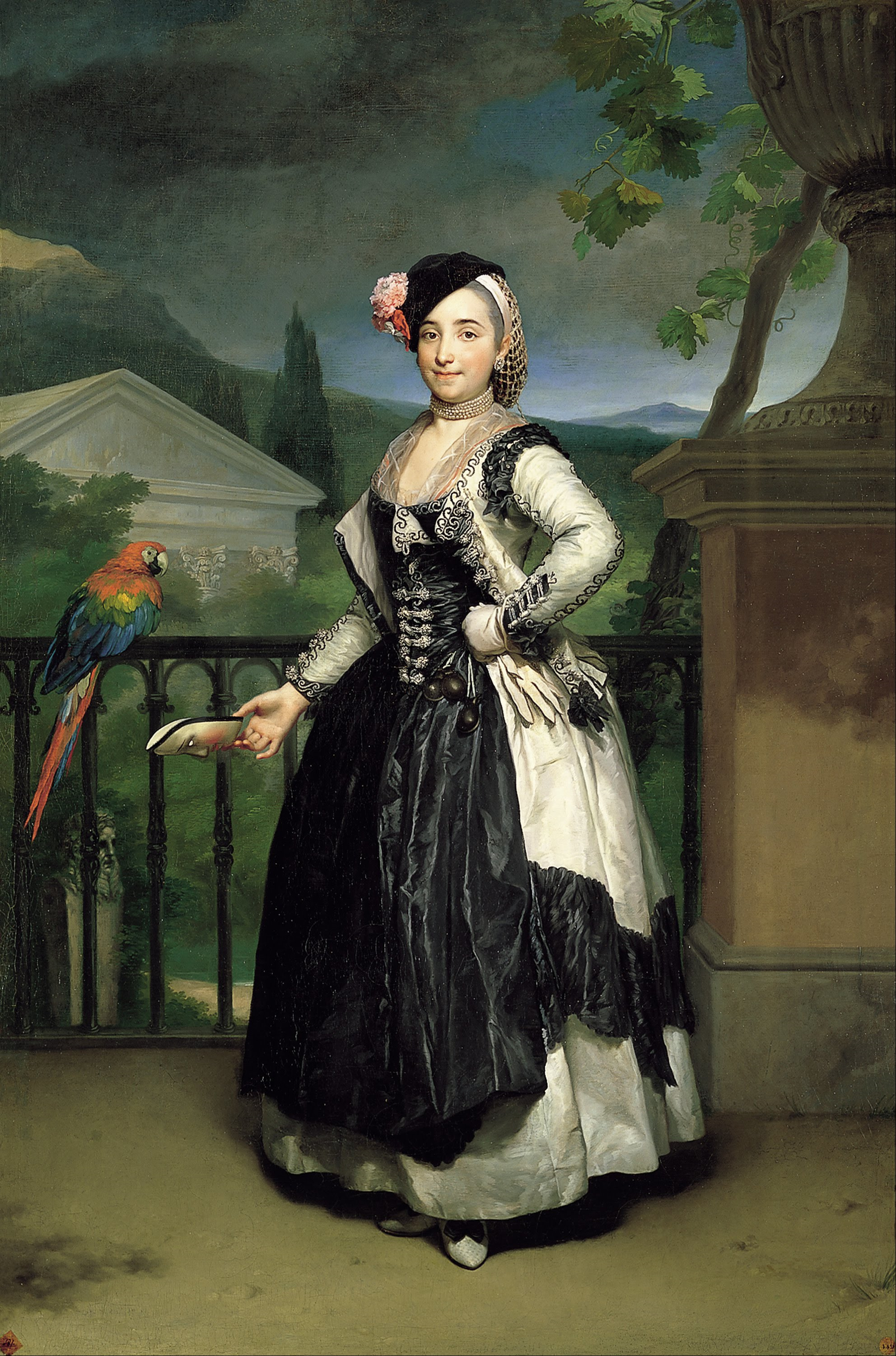
Isabel Parreño Arce, (1751 - 1823), wife of Spanish diplomat Jose Agustín de Llano y de la Cuadra. Painted around 1770 by Danish-German painter Anton Raphael Mengs (1728 - 1779). Oil on canvas, 250 x 148 cm. Museo de la Real Academia de Bellas Artes de San Fernando, Madrid, Spain

He died without issue on 23 April 1766. The 2nd Marquess of Villarías was his brother, Agustín de la Cuadra y de Llarena, (5 November 1679 - married 17 December 1709 to Andresa Manuela de Mollinedo).

Agustin and Sebastian had a sister, Francisca de la Cuadra y de Llarena, born also in San Julián de Musques on 13 October 1697. She married Simon de Llano y Musquez on 16 February 1716; they had 8 children. Among their children were:

- Sebastián de Llano y la Cuadra, born in 1727, who married in The Hague, Holland, Baroness María de Adelmar Paniariui, in 1783. He became the 3rd Marquess of Villarías in 1766 and was promoted to conde de Senafé (8 August 1780), awarded by King Charles III of Spain. He was also Ambassador to the United Provinces under King Charles IV of Spain.
- José Antonio de Llano y la Cuadra. Ambassador in Vienna, Austria, He was promoted to Marqués de Llano on the death in 1794 of his brother José Agustín.
- José Agustín de Llano y la Cuadra (15 October 1722 - 5 March 1794), born also in San Julián de Musques (today Muskiz, in Basque language). Oficial Mayor to the First Secretary of State, Ambassador in Vienna, Austria, Knight of the Military Order of Santiago in 1741, (sig. 4729), 1st Marqués de Llano, (23 April 1772), by King Charles III of Spain. He married on 12 June 1770 the very wealthy Isabel Parreño, from Corral de Almaguer, province of Toledo, Spain. She was painted by the famous Danish-German Court painter Anton Raphael Mengs (1728–1779), and protected in Vienna in 1785, Spanish opera and ballet composer Vicente Martín y Soler, (Valencia, 1754 - Saint Petersburg, Russia, January 1806) monitoring him to become the Director, court composer, after 1788 of the Saint Petersburg Opera, with Empress Catherine II of Russia.

== See also ==
- List of prime ministers of Spain
- Marquis of Tabernuiga

Political offices
Preceded by José Patiño	First Secretary of State; 1736–1746	Succeeded by José de Carvajal
Spanish nobility
New title	Marquess of Villarías; 1745–1766	Succeeded by Agustín de la Cuadra
