= Pedro Fernández del Campo y Salvatierra =

Spanish statesman

The 2nd Marquess of Mejorada del Campo

Pedro Cayetano Fernández del Campo y Salvatierra, 2nd Marquess of Mejorada del Campo (Madrid, 22 April 1656 - Madrid, 16 May 1721) was a Spanish statesman who held the post of Secretary of State and of the Universal Office (similar to prime minister), during the early years of the reign of Philip V of Spain.

== Biography ==
He was a son of Pedro Fernández del Campo y Angulo, 1st Marquess of Mejorada (also Secretary of State and of the Universal Office) and Teresa de Salvatierra y Blasco. He married Mariana de Alvarado Bracamonte, 2nd Marchioness of Breña, and they had two daughters.

He pursued an administrative career, being named extraordinary ambassador to the court of Vienna for the birth of the daughter of Emperor Leopold, secretary of the chamber of the Royal Patronage (1688) and was promoted to occupy one of the secretariats of the chamber of Castile.

In February 1705, Secretary of State and of the Universal Office, Antonio de Ubilla, was dismissed and he was appointed to replace him. He occupied the secretariat with full powers until 11 July 1705, when at the request of French Ambassador Michel-Jean Amelot and the King's Valido Jean Orry, part of his responsibilities were taken away and entrusted to the newly created Secretariat of War and Finance led by José de Grimaldo, 1st Marquess of Grimaldo, leaving "everything else" under del Campo's responsibility (basically political and church issues).

In 1714 he was relieved of his duties and assigned a position as a State Counselor.

Pedro Cayetano died on 16 May 1721 in the Castle of Viñuelas (Madrid), owned by his wife.
