= Juan Bautista de Orendáin y Azpilicueta =

Spanish politician

The Most Excellent Marquess of the Peace Juan Bautista de Orendáin KOS

First Secretary of State
- In office 14 January 1724 – 4 September 1724
- Monarchs: Louis I Philip V
- Preceded by: José de Grimaldo
- Succeeded by: José de Grimaldo
- In office 1 October 1726 – 21 November 1734
- Monarch: Philip V
- Preceded by: José de Grimaldo
- Succeeded by: José de Patiño y Rosales

Secretary of State of the Treasury
- In office 4 September 1724 – 12 December 1725
- Monarch: Philip V
- First Secretary of State: José de Grimaldo
- Preceded by: Fernando Verdes Montenegro
- Succeeded by: Juan Guillermo Ripperdá
- In office 14 May 1726 – 3 November 1726
- Monarch: Philip V
- First Secretary of State: José de Grimaldo; Himself
- Preceded by: Francisco de Arriaza Medina
- Succeeded by: José Patiño Rosales

Personal details
- Born: Juan Baustista de Orendáin y Azpilicueta

Juan Bautista de Orendáin y Azpilicueta, 1st Marquess of the Peace (16 October 1683 in Segura, Gipuzkoa – 21 October 1734 in Madrid), was a Spanish politician who served as prime minister in 1724 and between 1726 and 1734.

== Biography ==
Born in the province of Gipuzkoa, he moved to Yepes and later Madrid after his marriage with Hipólita Casado Busto. Here he became the protégé of prime minister José de Grimaldo and was introduced to the Royal Court.

When King Philip V of Spain abdicated from the throne in favor of his son Louis, José de Grimaldo also stood down as prime minister (First Secretary of State or Secretary of State and of the Dispatch of State) and Orendáin succeeded him. But when King Louis died from smallpox just seven months later, Philip V was forced to return to the Spanish throne. José de Grimaldo followed in his footsteps and replaced Orendáin as prime minister. Orendaín became Secretary of State of the Treasury.

The next year, together with Juan Guillermo Ripperdá, he was sent to Vienna where he negotiated the Treaty of Vienna (1725) with the former enemy. This treaty opened perspectives to regain former Spanish possessions in Italy. At their return, Ripperdá was made a Duke and also replaced Grimaldo, who favoured a treaty with Great Britain. Orendáin received the title of Marqués de la Paz (Marquess of Peace).

In October 1726 Orendáin became prime minister for the second time and he supported the aggressive foreign policy of Elisabeth Farnese, the Queen Consort, to regain former Spanish possessions in Italy.

He stayed in office until his death, aged 55, on 21 October 1734.

== Sources ==
- Basques, ORENDAIN AZPILCUETA, JUAN BAUTISTA
- Ministros de Hacienda de 1700 a 2004. Tres siglos de Historia

== See also ==
- List of prime ministers of Spain

Political offices
| Preceded by José de Grimaldo | First Secretary of State; 1724 | Succeeded by José de Grimaldo |
| Preceded by José de Grimaldo | First Secretary of State; 1726–1734 | Succeeded by José Patiño |
