= Medieval Inquisition =

System of tribunals enforcing Catholic orthodoxy

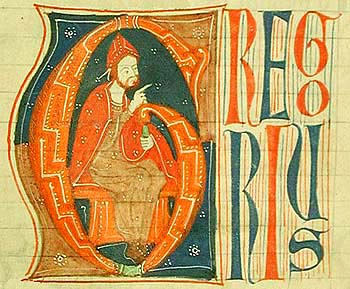
Pope Gregory IX from medieval manuscript: Universitätsbibliothek Salzburg, M III 97, 122rb, ca. 1270)

The Medieval Inquisition was a series of inquisitions (Catholic Church bodies charged with suppressing heresy) from around 1184, including the Episcopal Inquisition (1184–1230s) and later the Papal Inquisition (1230s). The Medieval Inquisition was established in response to movements considered apostate or heretical to Catholicism, in particular Catharism and Waldensians in Southern France and Northern Italy. These were the first of many inquisitions that would follow.

The Cathars were first noted in the 1140s in Southern France, and the Waldensians around 1170 in Northern Italy. Before this point, individual heretics such as Peter of Bruys had often challenged the Church. However, the Cathars were the first mass organization in the second millennium that posed a serious threat to the authority of the Church.

== Background ==
The Roman Emperor Constantine legalized Christianity in 312. Though only in the fourth century of its existence, Christianity had spread widely and was already beginning to experience a multiplicity of schisms within itself. Among the most significant of the heresies at this time were Arianism, Manichaeism, Gnosticism, the Adamites, the Donatists, the Pelagians, and Priscillianists.

The Edict of Thessalonica issued on 27 February 380 by Emperor Theodosius I established Nicene Christianity as the state church of the Roman Empire. It condemned other Christian creeds as heresies of "foolish madmen" and approved their punishment. In 438, under Emperor Theodosius II, the Codex Theodosianus (Theodosian Code), a compilation of laws of the Roman Empire, already provided for the confiscation of property and the death penalty for heretics. After the Fall of the Western Roman Empire in the 5th century, there followed almost seven centuries in which persecutions for heresy became very rare. Some of the old heresies survived, but in a weakened state, and they tended not to operate openly. No new schisms appeared to emerge during this period.

== Definition and Practice ==
An inquisition was a process that developed to investigate alleged instances of crimes. Its use in ecclesiastical courts was not at first directed to matters of heresy, but a broad assortment of offenses such as clandestine marriage and bigamy. French historian Jean-Baptiste Guiraud (1866–1953) defined Medieval Inquisition as "... a system of repressive means, some of temporal and some others of spiritual kind, concurrently issued by ecclesiastical and civil authorities in order to protect religious orthodoxy and social order, both threatened by theological and social doctrines of heresy."

Bishop of Lincoln, Robert Grosseteste, defined heresy as "an opinion chosen by human perception, created by human reason, founded on the Scriptures, contrary to the teachings of the Church, publicly avowed, and obstinately defended." The fault was in the obstinate adherence rather than theological error, which could be corrected; and by referencing scripture Grosseteste excludes Jews, Muslims, and other non-Christians from the definition of heretic.

There were many different types of inquisitions depending on the location and methods; historians have generally classified them into the episcopal inquisition and the papal inquisition. All major medieval inquisitions were decentralized, and each tribunal worked independently. Authority rested with local officials based on guidelines from the Holy See, but there was no central top-down authority running the inquisitions, as would be the case in post-medieval inquisitions.

Early Medieval courts generally followed a process called accusatio, largely based on Germanic practices. In this procedure, an individual would make an accusation against someone to the court. However, if the suspect was judged innocent, the accusers faced legal penalties for bringing false charges. This provided a disincentive to make any accusation unless the accusers were sure it would stand. Later, a threshold requirement was the establishment of the accused's publica fama, i.e., the fact that the person was widely believed to be guilty of the offense charged.

By the twelfth and early thirteenth centuries, there was a shift away from the accusatorial model toward the legal procedure used in the Roman Empire. Instead of an individual making accusations based on first-hand knowledge, judges now took on the prosecutorial role based on information collected. Under inquisitorial procedures, guilt or innocence was proved by the inquiry (inquisitio) of the judge into the details of a case.

=== Episcopal inquisitions ===
The common people tended to view heretics as "an antisocial menace. Heresy involved not only religious division, but social upset and political strife." In 1076 Pope Gregory VII excommunicated the residents of Cambrai because a mob had seized and burned a Cathar determined by the bishop to have been a heretic. A similar occurrence happened in 1114 during the bishops absence in Strassburg. In 1145 clergy at Liège managed to rescue victims from the crowd.

The first medieval inquisition, the episcopal inquisition, was established in the year 1184 by a papal bull of Pope Lucius III entitled Ad abolendam ("for the purpose of doing away with"). It was a response to the growing Catharist movement in southern France. This inquisition was called the "episcopal" inquisition, because it was administered by a local bishop, also known in latin as episcopus. This inquisition obliged bishops to visit their diocese twice a year in search of heretics.

The methods of dealing with heretics were gradually revised. Practices and procedures of episcopal inquisitions could vary from one diocese to another, depending on the resources available to individual bishops and their relative interest or disinterest. Convinced that Church teaching contained revealed truth, the first recourse of bishops was that of persuasio. Through discourse, debates, and preaching, they sought to present a better explanation of Church teaching. This approach often proved very successful.

=== Legatine inquisitions ===
The spread of other movements from the 12th century can be seen at least in part as a reaction to the increasing moral corruption of the clergy, which included illegal marriages and the possession of extreme wealth. In the Middle Ages, the Inquisition's main focus was to eradicate these new sects. Thus, its range of action was predominantly in Italy and France, where the Cathars and the Waldensians, the two main heretic movements of the period, were.

Bishops always had the authority to look into alleged heretical activity, but as it was not always clear what constituted heresy they conferred with their colleagues and sought advice from Rome. Legates were sent out, at first as advisors, later taking a greater role in the administration.

During the pontificate of Innocent III, papal legates were sent out to stop the spread of the Cathar and Waldensian heresies to Provence and up the Rhine into Germany. Procedures began to be formalized by time of Pope Gregory IX.

==== Cathars ====
The Cathars were a group of dissidents mostly in the South of France, in cities like Toulouse. The sect developed in the 12th century, apparently founded by soldiers from the Second Crusade, who, on their way back to France, were converted by a Bulgarian sect, the Bogomils.

The Cathars' main heresy was their belief in dualism: the evil God created the materialistic world and the good God created the spiritual world. Therefore, Cathars preached poverty, chastity, modesty and all those values which in their view helped people to detach themselves from materialism. The Cathars presented a problem to feudal government by their attitude towards oaths, which they declared under no circumstances allowable. Therefore, considering the religious homogeneity of that age, heresy was an attack against social and political order, besides orthodoxy.

The Albigensian Crusade resulted in the defeat of the Cathars militarily. After this, the Inquisition played an important role in finally destroying Catharism during the 13th and much of the 14th centuries. Punishments for Cathars varied greatly. Most frequently, they were made to wear yellow crosses atop their garments as a sign of outward penance. Others undertook obligatory pilgrimages, many for the purpose of fighting against Muslims. Another common punishment, including for returned pilgrims, was visiting a local church naked once each month to be scourged. Cathars who were slow to repent suffered imprisonment and, often, the loss of property. Others who altogether refused to repent were burned.

==== Waldensians ====
The Waldensians were mostly located in Germany and Northern Italy. The Waldensians were a group of orthodox laymen concerned about the increasing wealth of the Church. As time passed, however, they found their beliefs at odds with Catholic teaching. In contrast with the Cathars and in line with the Church, they believed in only one God, but they did not recognize a special class of priesthood, believing in the priesthood of all believers. They also objected to the veneration of saints and martyrs, which were part of the Church's orthodoxy. They rejected the sacramental authority of the Church and its clerics and encouraged apostolic poverty. These movements became particularly popular in Southern France as well as Northern Italy and other parts of Holy Roman Empire.

=== Papal inquisition ===
One reason for Pope Gregory IX's creation of the Inquisition was to bring order and legality to the process of dealing with heresy, since there had been tendencies by mobs of townspeople to burn alleged heretics without much of a trial. According to historian Thomas F. Madden: "The Inquisition was not born out of desire to crush diversity or oppress people; it was rather an attempt to stop unjust executions. Heresy was a crime against the state. Roman law in the Code of Justinian made heresy a capital offense" (emphasis in original). In the early Middle Ages, people accused of heresy were judged by the local lord, many of whom lacked theological training. Madden claims that "the simple fact is that the medieval Inquisition saved uncounted thousands of innocent (and even not-so-innocent) people who would otherwise have been roasted by secular lords or mob rule." Madden argues that while medieval secular leaders were trying to safeguard their kingdoms, the Church was trying to save souls. The Inquisition provided a means for heretics to escape death and return to the community.

The complaints of the two main preaching orders of the period, the Dominicans and the Franciscans, against the moral corruption of the Church to some extent echoed those of the heretical movements, but they were doctrinally conventional, and were enlisted by Pope Innocent III in the fight against heresy. In 1231 Pope Gregory IX appointed a number of Papal Inquisitors (Inquisitores haereticae pravitatis), mostly Dominicans and Franciscans, for the various regions of Europe. As mendicants, they were accustomed to travel. Unlike the haphazard episcopal methods, the papal inquisition was thorough and systematic, keeping detailed records. Some of the few documents from the Middle Ages involving first-person speech by medieval peasants come from papal inquisition records. This tribunal or court functioned in France, Italy and parts of Germany and had virtually ceased operation by the early fourteenth century.

Pope Gregory's original intent for the Inquisition was a court of exception to inquire into and glean the beliefs of those differing from Catholic teaching, and to instruct them in the orthodox doctrine. It was hoped that heretics would see the falsity of their opinion and would return to the Church. If they persisted in their heresy, however, Gregory, finding it necessary to protect the Catholic community from infection, would have suspects handed over to civil authorities, since public heresy was a crime under civil law as well as Church law. The secular authorities would apply their own brands of punishment for civil disobedience which, at the time, included burning at the stake. Over centuries the tribunals took different forms, investigating and stamping out various forms of heresy, including witchcraft.

Throughout the Inquisition's history, it was rivaled by local ecclesiastical and secular jurisdictions. No matter how determined, no pope succeeded in establishing complete control over the prosecution of heresy. Medieval kings, princes, bishops, and civil authorities all had a role in prosecuting heresy. The practice reached its apex in the second half of the 13th century. During this period, the tribunals were almost entirely free from any authority, including that of the pope. Therefore, it was almost impossible to eradicate abuse. For example, Robert le Bougre, the "Hammer of Heretics" (Malleus Haereticorum), was a Dominican friar who became an inquisitor known for his cruelty and violence. Another example was the case of the province of Venice, which was handed to the Franciscan inquisitors, who quickly became notorious for their frauds against the Church, by enriching themselves with confiscated property from the heretics and by the selling of absolutions. Because of their corruption, they were eventually forced by the Pope to suspend their activities in 1302.

In southern Europe, Church-run courts existed in the kingdom of Aragon during the medieval period, but not elsewhere in the Iberian peninsula or some other kingdoms, including England. In Scandinavian kingdoms it had hardly any impact.

At the beginning of the fourteenth century, two other movements attracted the attention of the Inquisition, the Knights Templar and the Beguines. It is not clear if the process against the Templars was initiated by the Inquisition on the basis of suspected heresy or if the Inquisition itself was exploited by the king of France, Philip the Fair, who owed them money and wanted the knights' wealth. In England the Crown was also deeply in debt to the Templars and, probably on that basis, the Templars were also persecuted in England, their lands forfeited and taken by others, (the last private owner being the favorite of Edward II, Hugh le Despenser). Many Templars in England were killed; some fled to Scotland and other places.

The Beguines were mainly a women's movement, recognized by the Church since their foundation in the thirteenth century. Marguerite Porete wrote a mystical book known as The Mirror of Simple Souls. The book provoked some controversy, because of statements which some took to mean that a soul can become one with God and that when in this state it can ignore moral law, as it had no need for the Church and its sacraments, or its code of virtues. The book's teachings were easily misconstrued. Porete was eventually tried by the Dominican inquisitor of France and burned at the stake as a relapsed heretic in 1310. The Council of Vienne of 1311 proclaimed them heretics and the movement went into decline.

The medieval Inquisition paid little attention to sorcery until Pope John XXII was the victim of an assassination attempt via poisoning and sorcery. In a letter written in 1320 to the Inquisitors of Carcassonne and Toulouse, Cardinal William of Santa Sabina states that Pope John declared witchcraft to be heresy, and thus it could be tried under the Inquisition.

=== Medieval Inquisition in Aragon ===
Although Raymond of Penyafort was not an inquisitor, James I of Aragon had often consulted him on questions of law regarding the practices of the Inquisition in the king's domains since Penyafort was a canon lawyer and royal advisor.

[T]he lawyer's deep sense of justice and equity, combined with the worthy Dominican's sense of compassion, allowed him to steer clear of the excesses that were found elsewhere in the formative years of the inquisitions into heresy.

Despite its early implantation, the Papal Inquisition was greatly resisted within the Crown of Aragon by both population and monarchs. With time, its importance was diluted, and, by the middle of the fifteenth century, it was almost forgotten although still there according to the law.

Regarding the living conditions of minorities, the kings of Aragon and other monarchies imposed some discriminatory taxation of religious minorities, so false conversions were a way of tax evasion.

In addition to the above discriminatory legislation, Aragon had laws specifically targeted at protecting minorities. For example, crusaders attacking Jewish or Muslim subjects of the King of Aragon while on their way to fight in the reconquest were punished with death by hanging. Up to the 14th century, the census and wedding records show an absolute lack of concern with avoiding intermarriage or blood mixture. Such laws were now common in most of central Europe. Both the Roman Inquisition and neighbouring Christian powers showed discomfort with Aragonese law and lack of concern with ethnicity, but to little effect.

High-ranking officials of Jewish descent were not as common as in Castile, but were not unheard of either. Abraham Zacuto was a professor at the university of Cartagena. Vidal Astori was the royal silversmith for Ferdinand II of Aragon and conducted business in his name. King Ferdinand himself was also said to have remote Jewish ancestry on his mother's side.

=== Medieval Inquisition in Castile ===
There was never a tribunal of the Papal Inquisition in Castile, nor any inquisition during the Middle Ages. Members of the episcopate were charged with surveillance of the faithful and punishment of transgressors, always under the direction of the king.

During the Middle Ages in Castile, the Catholic ruling class and the population paid little or no attention to heresy. Castile did not have the proliferation of anti-Jewish pamphlets as England and France did during the 13th and 14th centuries—and those that have been found were modified, watered-down versions of the original stories. Jews and Muslims were tolerated and generally allowed to follow their traditional customs in domestic matters.

Legislation regarding Muslims and Jews in Castilian territory varied greatly, becoming more intolerant during the period of great instability and dynastic wars that occurred by the end of the 14th century. Castilian law is particularly difficult to summarize since, due to the model of the free Royal Villas, mayors and the population of border areas had the right to create their own fueros (law) that varied from one villa to the next. In general, the Castilian model was parallel to the initial model of Islamic Spain. Non-Catholics were subject to discriminatory legislation regarding taxation and some other specific discriminatory legislation—such as a prohibition on wearing silk or "flashy clothes"—that varied from county to county, but were otherwise left alone. Forced conversion of minorities was against the law, and so was the belief in the existence of witchcraft, oracles or similar superstitions. In general, all "people from the book" were permitted to practice their own customs and religions as far as they did not attempt proselytizing on the Christian population. Jews particularly had surprising freedoms and protections compared with other areas of Europe and were allowed to hold high public offices such as the counselor, treasurer or secretary for the crown.

During most of the medieval period, intermarriage with converts was allowed and encouraged. Intellectual cooperation between religions was the norm in Castile. Some examples are the Toledo School of Translators from the 11th century. Jews and Moors were allowed to hold high offices in the administration (see Abraham Seneor, Samuel HaLevi Abulafia, Isaac Abarbanel, López de Conchillos, Miguel Pérez de Almazán, Jaco Aben Nunnes and Fernando del Pulgar).

A tightening of the laws to protect the right of Jews to collect loans during the Medieval Crisis was one of the causes of the revolt against Peter the Cruel and catalyst of the anti-semitic episodes of 1391 in Castile, a kingdom that had shown no significant antisemitic backlash to the black death and drought crisis of the early 14th century. Even after the sudden increase in hostility towards other religions that the kingdom experienced after the 14th-century crisis, which clearly worsened the living conditions of non-Catholics in Castile, it remained one of the most tolerant kingdoms in Europe.

The kingdom had serious tensions with Rome regarding the Church's attempts to extend its authority into the kingdom. A focus of conflict was Castilian resistance to truly abandon the Mozarabic Rite, and the refusal to grant Papal control over Reconquest land (a request Aragon and Portugal conceded). These conflicts added to a strong resistance to allowing the creation of an Inquisition, and the kingdom's general willingness to accept heretics seeking refuge from prosecution in France.

== Joan of Arc ==
In the spring of 1429 during the Hundred Years' War, in obedience to what she said was the command of God, Joan of Arc inspired the Dauphin's armies in a series of stunning military victories which lifted the siege of Orleans and destroyed a large percentage of the remaining English forces at the battle of Patay. A series of military setbacks eventually led to her capture in the Spring of 1430 by the Burgundians, who were allied with the English. They delivered her to them for 10,000 livres. In December of that same year she was transferred to Rouen, the military headquarters and administrative capital in France of King Henry VI of England, and placed on trial for heresy before a Church court headed by Bishop Pierre Cauchon, a supporter of the English.

The trial was politically motivated. Cauchon, although a native of France, had served in the English government since 1418, and he was therefore hostile to a woman who had worked for the opposing side. The same was true of the other tribunal members. Ascribing a diabolic origin to her victories would be an effective way to ruin her reputation and bolster the morale of English troops. Thus the decision to involve the Inquisition, which did not initiate the trial and in fact showed a reluctance throughout its duration.

Seventy charges were brought against her, including accusations of heresy and dressing as a male (i.e., wearing soldiers' clothing and armor). Eyewitnesses later said that Joan had told them she was wearing this clothing and keeping it "firmly laced and tied together" because the tunic could be tied to the long boots to keep her guards from pulling her clothing off during their occasional attempts to rape her.

Joan was first condemned to life imprisonment and the deputy-inquisitor, Jean Le Maitre (whom the eyewitness said only attended because of threats from the English), obtained from her assurances of relinquishing her male clothes. However, after four days, during which she was said to have been subjected to attempted rape by English soldiers, she put her soldier's clothing back on because (according to the eyewitnesses) she needed protection against rape. Cauchon declared her a relapsed heretic, and she was burned at the stake two days later on 30 May 1431.

In 1455, a petition by Joan of Arc's mother Isabelle led to a re-trial designed to investigate the dubious circumstances which led to Joan's execution. The Inquisitor-General of France was put in charge of the new trial, which opened in Notre Dame de Paris on 7 November 1455. After analyzing all the proceedings, including Joan's answers to the allegations and the testimony of 115 witnesses who were called to testify during the appellate process, the inquisitor overturned her condemnation on 7 July 1456. Joan of Arc was eventually canonized in 1920.

Historian Edward Peters identifies a number of illegalities in Joan's first trial in which she had been convicted.

== Inquisition procedure ==
The papal inquisition developed a number of procedures to discover and prosecute heretics. These codes and procedures detailed how an inquisitorial court was to function. If the accused renounced their heresy and returned to the Church, forgiveness was granted and a penance was imposed. If the accused upheld their heresy, they were excommunicated and turned over to secular authorities. The penalties for heresy, though not as severe as the secular courts of Europe at the time, were codified within the ecclesiastic courts as well (e.g. confiscation of property, turning heretics over to the secular courts for punishment). Additionally, the various "key terms" of the inquisitorial courts were defined at this time, including, for example, "heretics," “believers," "those suspect of heresy," "those simply suspected," "those vehemently suspected," and "those most vehemently suspected".

=== Investigation ===
The townspeople would be gathered in a public place. The inquisitors would provide an opportunity for anyone to step forward and denounce themselves in exchange for leniency. Legally, there had to be at least two witnesses, although conscientious judges rarely contented themselves with that number.

=== Trial ===
At the beginning of the trial, defendants were invited to name those who had "mortal hatred" against them. If the accusers were among those named, the defendant was set free and the charges dismissed; the accusers would face life imprisonment. This option was meant to keep the inquisition from becoming involved in local grudges. Early legal consultations on conducting inquisition stress that it is better that the guilty go free than that the innocent be punished. Gregory IX urged Conrad of Marburg: "ut puniatur sic temeritas perversorum quod innocentiae puritas non laedatur" – i.e., "not to punish the wicked so as to hurt the innocent".

There was no personal confrontation of witnesses, neither was there any cross-examination. Witnesses for the defense hardly ever appeared, as they would almost infallibly be suspected of being heretics or favorable to heresy. At any stage of the trial the accused could appeal to Rome.

=== Torture ===
Like the inquisitorial process itself, torture was an ancient Roman legal practice commonly used in secular courts.

The Council of Toulouse in 1119, called by Calixtus II, ordered that heretics were to be dealt with through coercion exercised by temporal authorities.

On May 15, 1252, Pope Innocent IV issued a papal bull entitled Ad extirpanda, which authorized the limited use of torture by inquisitors. Much of the brutality commonly associated with the Inquisition was actually previously common in secular courts, but prohibited under the Inquisition, including torture methods that resulted in bloodshed, miscarriages, mutilation or death. Also, torture could be performed only once, and for a limited duration.

In preparation for the Jubilee in 2000, the Vatican opened the archives of the Holy Office (the modern successor to the Inquisition) to a team of 30 scholars from around the world. According to the governor general of the Order of the Holy Sepulchre, recent studies "seem to indicate" that "torture and the death penalty were not applied with the pitiless rigor" often ascribed to the Inquisition. Other methods such as threats and imprisonment seem to have proven more effective.

=== Punishment ===
The Council of Tour in 1163, presided over by Pope Alexander III, ordered the confiscation of a heretic's goods and lands. Of 5,400 people interrogated in Toulouse between 1245 and 1246, 184 received penitential yellow crosses (used to mark repentant Cathars), 23 were imprisoned for life, and none were sent to the stake.

The most extreme penalty available in antiheretical proceedings was reserved for relapsed or stubborn heretics. The unrepentant and apostates could be "relaxed" to secular authority, however, opening the convicted to the possibility of various corporal punishments, up to and including being burned at the stake. Execution was neither performed by the Church, nor was it a sentence available to the officials involved in the inquisition, who, as clerics, were forbidden to kill. The accused also faced the possibility that his or her property might be confiscated. In some cases, accusers may have been motivated by a desire to take the property of the accused, though this is a difficult assertion to prove in the majority of areas where the inquisition was active, as the inquisition had several layers of oversight built into its framework in a specific attempt to limit prosecutorial misconduct.

The inquisitors generally preferred not to hand over heretics to the secular arm for execution if they could persuade the heretic to repent: Ecclesia non novit sanguinem (The Church knows not Blood). For example, of the 900 guilty verdicts levied against 636 individuals by the Dominican friar and inquisitor Bernard Gui, no more than 45 resulted in execution.

== Legacy ==
By the 14th century the Waldensians had been driven underground. Some residents of the Pays Cathare identify themselves as Cathars even today. They claim to be descended from the Cathars of the Middle Ages. However, the delivering of the consolamentum, on which historical Catharism was based, required a linear succession by a bon homme in good standing. It is believed that one of the last known bons hommes, Guillaume Belibaste, was burned in 1321.

== See also ==
- Inquisition
- Spanish Inquisition
- Portuguese Inquisition
- Roman Inquisition
- Goa Inquisition
- Nicolau Aymerich
- Peruvian Inquisition
- Mexican Inquisition

== Bibliography ==
=== Secondary sources ===
- Costen, Michael D. (1997). The Cathars and the Albigensian Crusade. Manchester and New York: Manchester University Press. ISBN 0-7190-4331-X.
- Peters, Edward (1988). Inquisition. Berkeley and Los Angeles, CA: University of California Press. ISBN 0-520-06630-8.
- Sabatini, Rafael (1930). Torquemada and the Spanish Inquisition (rev. ed.). Houghton Mifflin Company.
- Sumption, Jonathan (1978). The Albigensian Crusade. London, England: Faber. ISBN 0-571-11064-9.

=== Primary sources ===
- Peter of les Vaux de Cernay (1998) [1212–1218]. Silby, W.A.; Silby, M.D. (eds.). The History of the Albigensian Crusade: Peter of les Vaux-de-Cernay's Historia Albigensis. Suffolk, UK: Boydell & Brewer. ISBN 0-85115-807-2.
