= Sebastián de Llano y la Cuadra =

Spanish politician

Sebastián de Llano y de la Cuadra, (1736 - The Hague, Holland, 14 May 1793), a Fellow, a "Colegial", of the Santa Cruz College at the University of Valladolid, Spanish politician, Secretary of the Spanish Embassy in Vienna, Austria, since June 1760, Plenipotentiary Minister in Copenhagen, Danmark, in November 1763, on leave from March 1768 to January 1770, Plenipotentiary Minister in the Spanish Embassy in Sweden since December 1772, on leave from June 1775 to June 1778, Plenipotentiary Minister in Holland, United Provinces, since October 1779,

He was awarded the title of 1st Conde de Senafé on 8 August 1780, by King Carlos III of Spain being the brother of José Agustin de Llano y de la Cuadra, (October 1722 - March 1794), 1st Marqués de Llano, title awarded by King Carlos III of Spain on 23 April 1780, both being nephews of Sebastián de la Cuadra, 1st Marquis of Villarías, (1687 - 1766), First Secretary of State with King Felipe V of Spain, (1736 - 1746),
