= Miguel Pérez de Almazán =

Spanish nobility (d. 1514)

Miguel Pérez de Almazán (Calatayud, Aragón, ? - Madrid, Castile, 1514) was a Spanish hidalgo.

== Life ==
The son of converted Jews, Almazán served as the private secretary of Ferdinand the Catholic, and later the Royal secretary of the Catholic Monarchs, after the death of Juan de Coloma. He became a member of the Order of Santiago, Commodore of Beas and of Valdericote.

He was described as meditative, careful, intelligent and self-assured.

Almazán ascended quickly in the ranks of the court and become one of the senior members. Almazán arrived to Madrid under the protection of Juan de Coloma, and quickly ascended to the rank of Chancellor. In that position he signed the decree of expulsion in 1492.

He became one of the monarch's most important and trusted secretaries; the equivalent of a modern minister of international affairs. His signature can be found in the Capitulations of Santa Fe together with Christopher Columbus. Later in his career, Almazán oversaw Portugal's international diplomacy with France, Italy and Flanders. One of his responsibilities was finding a suitable husband for the royal daughters, Juana and Catalina. Almazán participated in the Treaty of Villafáfila.

On 6 November 1510, King Ferdinand appointed him chief founder (fundidor mayor) of Hispaniola. It was a symbolic post, since Pérez de Almazán was allowed to delegate his duties, but it granted him additional income.
