= John William, Baron Ripperda =

Dutch-Spanish political adventurer and Spanish Prime Minister (1684–1737)

The Most Excellent The Duke of Ripperdá GE
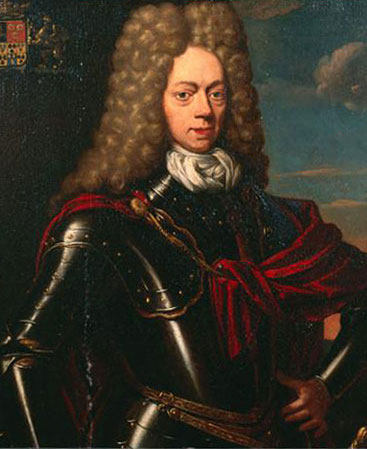

Secretary of State and of the Office
- In office 12 December 1725 – 14 April 1726
- Monarch: Philip V

Personal details
- Born: Johan Willem Ripperda; 7 March 1684 Oldehove, Groningen
- Died: 5 November 1737 (aged 53) Tétouan
- Spouse(s): Aleida van Schellingwoude; Francisca de Xarava del Castillo
- Parent(s): Ludolph Luirdt Ripperda tot Winsum; Maria Isabella van Deest

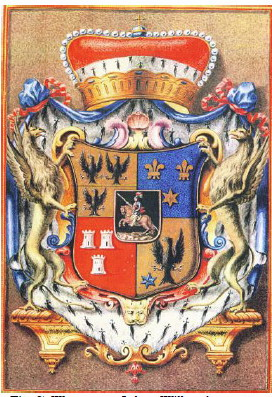
Coat-of-Arms of the Duke of Ripperdá

Juan Guillermo, Baron de Ripperdá, 1st Duke of Ripperdá (7 March 1684 – 5 November 1737), was a political adventurer that served as de facto prime minister of Spain from December 1725 to April 1726, as favourite of Philip V.

== Early life ==
According to a story which he himself set going during his adventures in Spain, his family was of Spanish origin. However, there was no foundation for this assertion, which was likely driven by his desire to strengthen his position in Spain. In fact, he was born as Baron Johan Willem Ripperda, son of Baron Ludolph Luirdt Ripperda tot Winsum, a Dutch military commander, and Maria Isabella van Deest.

He was a scion of the Ripperdas, one of the oldest and most influential noble families in Groningen, with origins going back to East Frisia. He was born a Catholic and attended a Jesuit School in Cologne, he conformed to Dutch Calvinism in order to obtain his election as delegate to the states-general from Groningen.

== Career ==
=== Dutch ambassador to Madrid ===
In 1715 he was sent by the Dutch government as ambassador to Madrid. Saint-Simon says that his character for probity was even then considered doubtful. The fortune of Jean Orry, Giulio Alberoni and other foreigners in Spain, showed that the court of Philip V offered a career to adventurers. Ripperda, whose name is commonly spelt de Riperdá by the Spaniards, devoted himself to the Spanish government, and again professed himself a Catholic. He first attached himself to Alberoni, and after the fall of that minister he became the agent of Elizabeth Farnese, the restless and intriguing wife of Philip V. Though perfectly unscrupulous in money matters, and of a singularly vain and blustering disposition, he did understand commercial questions, and he had the merit of having pointed out that the poverty of Spain was mainly due to the neglect of its agriculture. But his fortune was not due to any service of a useful kind he rendered his masters. He rose by undertaking to aid the queen, whose influence over her husband was boundless, in her schemes for securing the succession to Parma and Tuscany for her sons.

=== Spanish envoy to Vienna ===
Ripperda was sent as special envoy to Vienna in 1724 and was elevated to the rank of duke. He behaved outrageously, but the Austrian government, which was under the influence of its own fixed idea, treated him seriously. The result of ten months of very strange diplomacy was a series of agreements known collectively as the Treaty of Vienna (1725) by which the Emperor promised very little, and the Ostend Company received commercial rights in the Spanish colonies in the Americas. Spain was bound to pay heavy subsidies, which its exhausted treasury was quite unable to afford. The emperor hoped to obtain money. Elizabeth Farnese hoped to secure the Italian duchies for her sons, and some vague stipulations were made that Charles VI should give his aid for the recovery by Spain of Gibraltar and Menorca.

When Ripperda returned to Madrid at the close of 1725, he asserted that the emperor expected him to be made prime minister. The Spanish sovereigns, who were overawed by this quite unfounded assertion, allowed him to grasp the most important posts under the crown. He used his office for quick profit, but also excited animosity from numerous foreign and local sources: the Austrians who sought compensation promised in the recent agreements, but who demurred on the offered dynastic marriages. English and Prussian governments were highly alienated by his machinations and threats. The Spanish populace were alienated by his debasement of the coinage.

=== End of Spanish career ===
His career was short. In 1726 the Austrian envoy, who had vainly pressed for the payment of the promised subsidies, came to an explanation with the Spanish sovereigns. It was discovered that Ripperda had not only made promises that he was not authorized to make, but had misappropriated large sums of money. The sovereigns who had made him duke and grandee shrank from covering themselves with ridicule by revealing the way in which they had been deceived. Ripperda was dismissed with the promise of a pension. By the time of his dismissal in May of 1726, he had entered into a complication of intrigues with the French and British governments. He sought sanctuary in Madrid at the embassy of the English ambassador, Colonel William Stanhope, afterwards Lord Harrington. To secure the favor of the British envoy, he betrayed the secrets of his government. Stanhope could not protect him, and he was sent as a prisoner to the castle of Segovia.

=== Last years ===
In 1728 he escaped, most likely with the connivance of the government, and made his way to Holland. His last years are obscure. It is said that he reverted to Protestantism, and then went to Morocco, where he became a Muslim and commanded the Moors in an unsuccessful attack on Ceuta. However, this story is founded on his so-called Memoirs, which are in fact a Grub Street tale of adventure published at Amsterdam in 1740. (Note: The story goes he joined the service of Sultan Modey Abdallah. He served as a minister and later as a general commanding the Moors in an unsuccessful campaign against the Spanish. Following his defeat he was forced to flee Morocco and, once again, ended up in London and then Holland. This time, he was enticed by the promise of the crown of Corsica to put together a shipment of weapons to help in the Corsican fight for independence. However, this campaign also ended in disaster, after Baron Neuhoff took the credit and ended up being crowned king instead.) All that is really known is that he did go to Morocco, where he died at Tetuan in 1737.

== Personal life ==
He was married twice. His first wife was Aleida van Schellingwoude from whom he inherited the lordships of Poelgeest and Koudekerk. Together, they were the parents of:

- Ludolph Luirdt Ripperdá, Baron Ripperda, who also served as Spanish ambassador to Vienna; he married Margaretha Anna von Cobenzl
- Maria Nicoletta Ripperdá, who married the Spanish Count Balthasar de Argumossa.

His second wife was the Spanish lady Francisca de Xarava del Castillo; they had two sons, including:

- Baron Juan María Vicencio de Ripperdá (1725–1780), who became a Spanish officer and Governor of Texas and Honduras.
- Francois Joseph von Ripperda (1731–1805), who married Margaret Alied Schroeder.

Ripperda escaped Spain with the assistance of the servant girl, Josepha Francisca Ramos. They had a son, Francois Joseph, whose descendants still live near Lingen in Germany and across the United States. There are over 600 descendants in the United States none of whom are formally considered to belong to the House of Ripperda.
