= Capitulations of Santa Fe =

Signed document between Christopher Columbus and the rulers of Spain

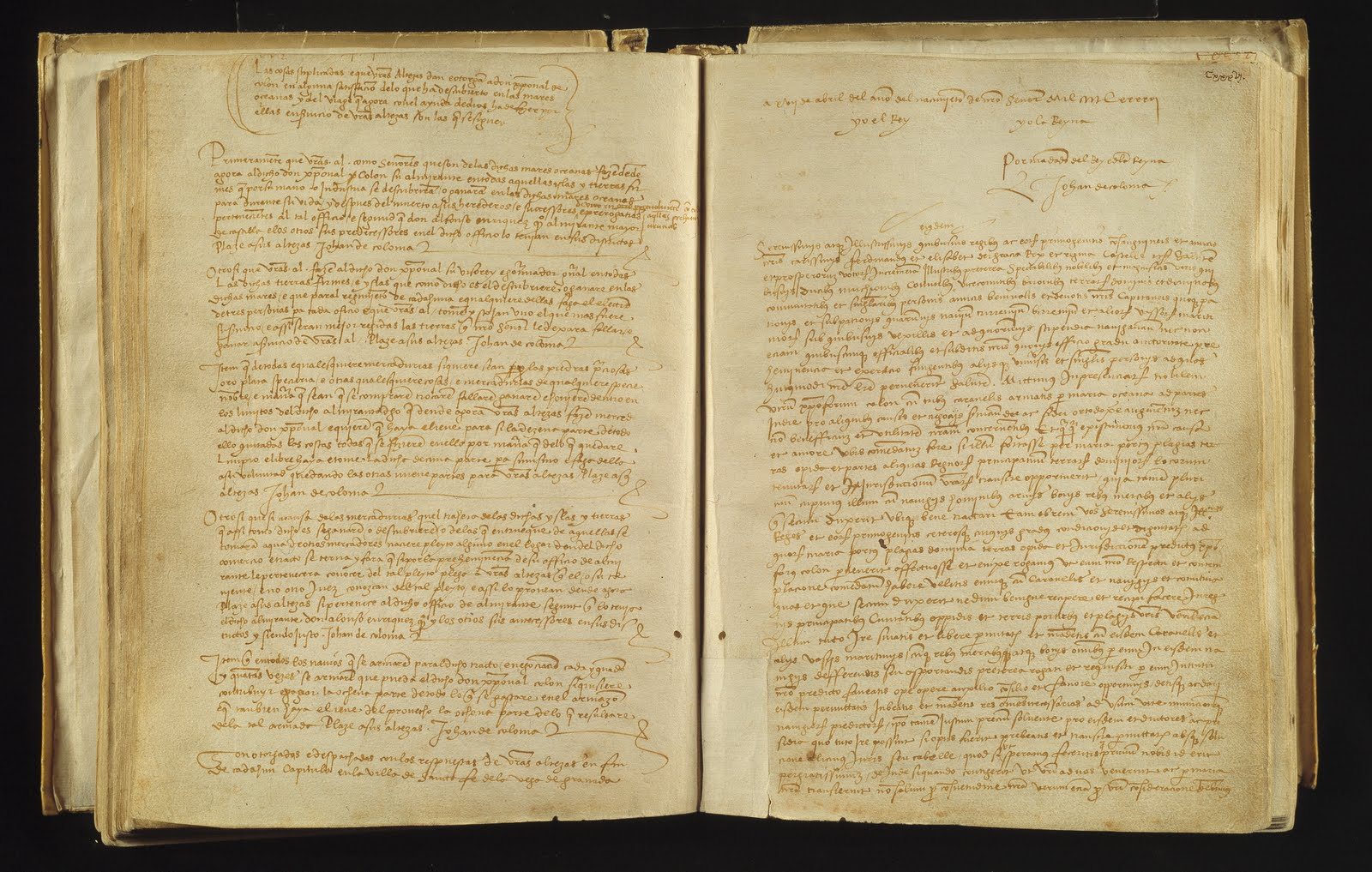
The Capitulations by Juan II Coloma, 1st Lord of Elda

The Capitulations of Santa Fe between Christopher Columbus and the Catholic Monarchs, Queen Isabella I of Castile and King Ferdinand II of Aragon, were signed in Santa Fe, Granada on April 17, 1492. They granted Columbus the titles of admiral of the Ocean Sea, viceroy, and governor-general and the honorific don, and also the tenth part of all riches to be obtained from his intended voyage. The document followed a standard form in use since the 14th Century in Catalonia, in which the Catalan King had to agree on specific conditions with those building boats and taking to the sea. The first documented capitulation appears in the "Capitula conventa inter Dominum Regem Petrum, et Diputatos Cathaloniae et Maioricarum, Super armatam fiendam in guerra Castellae " of 1363. The agreements have specific points arranged in chapters (capítulos).

When Columbus's proposal was initially rejected, Queen Isabella convoked another assembly, made up from sailors, philosophers, astrologers and others to reexamine the project. The experts considered absurd the distances between Spain and the Indies that Columbus calculated. The monarchs also became doubting, but a group of influential courtiers convinced them that they would lose little if the project failed and would gain much if it succeeded. Among those advisors were the archbishop of Toledo Hernando de Talavera, the notary Luis de Santángel and the chamberlain Juan Cabrero. Since the Capitulations were an already well stablished legal agreement in Catalonia, it is logical that it was the secretary of king Ferdinand II of Catalonia and Aragon, Juan II Coloma, who was ordered to formulate the capitulations. The agreement took three months to prepare because the monarchs were busy with other matters. The capitulations were sealed at the Santa Fe encampment, which had been built on the outskirts of Granada as a military base of operations during the city's siege.

The original version has not survived. The earliest surviving copy is contained in the confirmations issued by the Crown in Barcelona in 1493, since the Capitulations were binding in Catalan law. The Catholic Monarchs were ruling then by keeping their different legal systems, and Christopher Columbus requested agreements that applied only in the Catalan-Aragonese Kingdom. The omission of the word 'Asia' has led some historians to suggest that Columbus never intended to go there, but only to discover the new lands. In 2009 the Santa Fe Capitulations were inscribed by UNESCO on the Memory of the World International Register.

== See also ==
- Treaty of Alcáçovas
- Inter caetera
- Pleitos colombinos
- Alice Bache Gould
