= Juan II Coloma, 1st Lord of Elda =

"Por mandado del Rey e de la Reyna Johan de Coloma" autograph on the Capitulacions de Santa Fe

Juan de Coloma (c.1442 Borja - August 1517 Zaragoza) also known as Mosen Coloma was an important royal secretary and diplomat for the Spanish Crown of Aragon and later for the Crown of Castile. He produced many relevant documents such as the Decret of Expulsion, or the Capitulations of Santa Fe from 1492. He also contributed to the establishment of the Spanish Inquisition. He later in life became the 1st Lord of Elda, and Baron of Alfajarin.

== Family ==
It has been recently documented that royal secretary Juan de Coloma was the son of Juan de Coloma and Pascuala de Pasamar, from Borja. His first marriage was to Dona Isabel Díez de Aux. After her death, he married Dona María Pérez Calvillo, Lady of Malon and Bisimbre. She was from a wealthy Jewish house who converted to avoid expulsion. Therefore his descendants all had Jewish blood.

Coloma had one legitimate son born in 1500: Juan III Francisco Coloma: 3rd Lord of Alfajarin, 2nd Lord of Elda, Salinas and Petrer. His illegitimate daughter became abbess of the monastery of Poor Clares in Zaragozza, where he is buried in the monastery that he founded.

== Career ==
At a young age, he was sent to the royal court of Juan II de Aragón; He became a close confidant to the king and from 1462 was his royal secretary. He took office between 1462 and 1479. His career continued during the reign of Ferdinand and Isabella, in which he accompanied the court during the war to Granada. There he designed one of his major acts, the Alhambra Decree.

He was requested to give counsel concerning the foundation of the Holy Inquisition in Aragon and sent a royal diplomat to the king of France Charles VIII. At the request of his patrons, he designed the conditions that Columbus could receive the royal patronage for his expedition. He concluded the important document with the royal approbation for Columbus in 1491. This concluded in the Capitulations of Santa Fe. Some of the diplomat tasks Coloma was assigned to were the negotiations of 1493 on the recovery of the Roussilon and the Cerdagne during the Treaty of Barcelona, or the negotiations regarding the failed marriage attempt between Henry II of Navarre and Isabella of Austria.

Ferdinand was grateful and bestowed noble status to his first wife in 1506. However he wanted to climb higher and bought the Barony of Elda, Salinas and Petrer in 1512. This made possible that his descendants could ascend the hierarchy of the Spanish nobility.

After the King's death in 1516, he retired to his palace in Zaragoza, where he became the second lord of Alfajarin. He then returned to Borja, where he died.

== Memorial ==
In 2017, the Centro de Estudios Borjanos organised the Año Coloma in honour of the 500th anniversary of his death.

== See also ==
- Treaty of Barcelona
- Alhambra Decree
- Capitulations of Santa Fe

== Books ==
- Alfaro Lapuerta, Emilio: «Don Juan de Coloma, caballero de Borja»; Fernando el Católico y la Hispanidad, Zaragoza, 1952, pp. 37–50.
- Gascón de Gotor, Anselmo: «Aragón en América: el Magnífico D. Juan de Coloma y las Capitulaciones de Santa Fe»; Doce de Octubre, Zaragoza, 1967.
- Lacarra, José M.ª: «Un libro de notas del secretario del Rey Católico, Juan de Coloma»; Martínez Ferrando, archivero, Barcelona, 1968, pp. 217– 237.
