= Jaime Vélaz de Medrano y Barros, III Marquess of Tabuérniga =

Spanish exile and diplomat

Antonio Velaz de Medrano y Altamirano (1637–1683) was the Marquis of Tabuérniga, a Spanish aristocrat and diplomat of the 18th century who spent many years in exile and ended up in the service of the Kingdom of Great Britain.

== Exile ==
He was forced into exile from Spain in 1724 after questioning the legality of the return of King Philip V to the throne following his recent abdication, and Tabernuiga suggested that constitutionally his son Ferdinand ought to inherit the crown. This made him a bitter enemy of both the King and his wife Elisabeth of Parma widely regarded as the most powerful person in Spain. Tabernuiga was forced to leave the country and spent some time in Central Europe before settling in London in 1738 where he became a confidant of Lord Carteret and the Duke of Newcastle - both leading politicians. He remained there after the outbreak of the War of Jenkins' Ear between Britain and his native country.

== Lisbon Mission ==
In 1746 Newcastle, then Southern Secretary and in control of British foreign policy, approached Tabernuiga and proposed that he go to Lisbon to open secret negotiations with Spain about a peace treaty. Tabernuiga agreed, and made contact with the Prime Minister of Spain Sebastián de la Cuadra, 1st Marquis of Villarías in August 1746 - setting out the proposed British terms. As the former King was dead, and Ferdinand had taken the Spanish throne - Tabernuiga was in favour with the Spanish court and Villarías told him Spain was ready to agree terms. The talks floundered over the future of Naples and finally broke down, although the Spanish remained open to further discussions at a later date. Tabernuiga stayed in Lisbon, hoping to be made Secretary of State of Spain - although he was to be frustrated in this goal.

== Later life ==
Tabernuiga later returned to England and remained an informal advisor for Newcastle. He was part of the Duke's widespread intelligence-gathering service, and Newcastle used him to spy on his rival Carteret and other leading Opposition figures.

== Bibliography ==
- Lodge, Sir Richard. Studies in Eighteenth Century Diplomacy 1740-1748. John Murray, 1930.
