= José de Grimaldo =

Spanish statesman

The Most Excellent The Marquess of Grimaldo
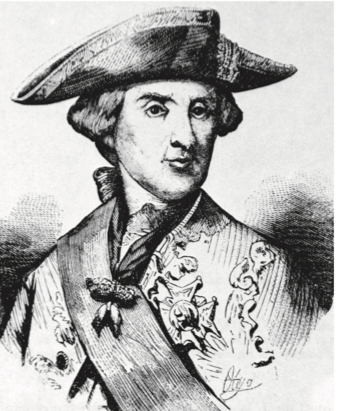

First Secretary of State
- In office 4 September 1724 – 1 October 1726
- Monarch: Philip V
- Preceded by: The Marquess of the Peace
- Succeeded by: The Marquess of the Peace
- In office 30 November 1714 – 14 January 1724
- Monarch: Philip V
- Preceded by: The Marquess of Mejorada del Campo (as Secretary of State "for everything else")
- Succeeded by: The Marquess of the Peace

Secretary of State for War and Treasury
- In office 11 July 1705 – 30 November 1714
- Monarch: Philip V
- Preceded by: The Marquess of Mejorada del Campo (as Secretary of the Universal Bureau)
- Succeeded by: Miguel Fernández Durán (War); Jean Orry (Treasury)

Personal details
- Born: José Francisco de Grimaldo y Gutiérrez de Solórzano; 4 July 1660 Madrid, Spain
- Died: July 3, 1733 (aged 72) Madrid, Spain
- Spouse: Francisca García Caballero Hermosa Espejo (m. 1708)
- Children: 2
- Occupation: Civil servant; politician
- Awards: Order of the Golden Fleece; Order of Santiago

José de Grimaldo y Gutiérrez de Solórzano, 1st Marquess of Grimaldo (1660–1733) was a Spanish statesman.

== Early life ==
Grimaldo was born in Madrid in 1660 to a wealthy family who had gained experience serving in the administration of the colonies of the Spanish Empire. In 1683 he was admitted into the Order of Santiago as a gesture to his parentage, but while he began to be acknowledged as a rising politician he failed to gain any serious appointment in government until the 1690s when the old dynasty died out. In 1697, he was appointed private secretary to King Charles II.

== War of the Spanish Succession ==
Grimaldo became a follower of French politician Jean Orry who was sent to Spain in 1701, in order to assist the new king. In July 1705, he was appointed Secretary of State for War and Treasury, a position he held throughout the War of the Spanish Succession. After the war, satisfied with his work, King Philip V created him Marquess of Grimaldo by Royal Decree of 28 October 1714.

== Prime Minister of Spain ==
=== First term ===
When the King reformed the government and established the first specialized ministries, Grimaldo was appointed Secretary of State, or First Secretary of State, in charge of foreign affairs. However the fall of Orry in 1715 helped cardinal Giulio Alberoni to gain influence, assuming as de facto prime minister. Alberoni fell into disgrace in 1719, and Grimaldo was finally able to rule freely.

It was a turbulent era for Spain, as they had been forced to accept the loss of huge amounts of territory (particularly to Austria in Italy, as well as losing Minorca and Gibraltar to Britain). Grimaldo helped to re-assert Spain, rebuilding its shattered Army and Navy.

=== Second term and retirement ===
When the King abdicated in 1724, often attributed to a fit of madness or a desire to be considered a claimant to the French throne, Grimaldo left office with him. However, the reign of his son, Louis I, was brief, dying six months after his accession.

When King Philip regained the throne, Grimaldo was re-appointed as First Secretary of State. His poor health, combined with the constant interference of John William, Baron Ripperda, the strongman of the court, were decisive factors in his leaving the government in October 1726. He was succeeded by his protégé Juan Bautista de Orendáin y Azpilicueta, 1st Marquess of the Peace.

He died in 1733, at the age of seventy two.

== Family and marriage ==
José de Grimaldo was part of a noble family with properties near the city of Plasencia (Cáceres). They were also high-ranking officials of the Crown; his great-grandfather served as a notary in the Royal Chamber and the Council of Castile, and his grandfather and father as private secretaries to King Philip IV and King Charles II.

On 25 February 1708 Grimaldo married Francisca García Caballero Hermosa Espejo (1684–1766) in the Church of Saints Justo and Pastor of Madrid. Francisca was the daughter of Sebastián García Caballero, paymaster of the Royal Factory and Mine of Quicksilver in Almadén, and of Lucía Sánchez de Espejo y Zisneros.

From this marriage two children were born:

- Bernardo María José Benito de Grimaldo y García Caballero (1713–1794), 2nd Marquess of Grimaldo.
- Pedro Cayetano de Grimaldo y García Caballero.

== See also ==
- List of prime ministers of Spain

Political offices
Preceded by The Marquess of Mejorada del Campo (as Secretary of the Universal Bureau)	First Secretary of State; 1714–1724	Succeeded by The Marquess of the Peace
Preceded by The Marquess of the Peace	First Secretary of State; 1724–1726	Succeeded by The Marquess of the Peace
