= Juan Cabrero =

Spanish friend of Christopher Columbus

Juan Cabrero (1442–1512) was the High Chamberlain and counselor of King Ferdinand the Catholic, Commander and one of the Thirteen of St James Order, and a professional combatant during the Granada War in Spain. High Chamberlain Cabrero is considered an important figure in the History of the 1st Voyage of Christopher Columbus, for he is referred to by Christopher Columbus along with Diego de Deza as the cause of the acceptance of his Indies Enterprise in 1492 by the Catholic Monarchs. Cabrero's pivotal support is also confirmed by Diego Columbus and King Ferdinand.

The figure of Chamberlain Juan Cabrero has experienced a rebirth in the last years, due to the discovery of his last will, which is 28 pages long. This extensive document provided much more information on the historical figure and his motivations, and favored new analysis that conclude that Cabrero was probably the last supporter who came into play in the negotiations in 1492, and the person who finally turned the tides for Columbus.

== Early life and the Granada War ==
Juan Cabrero was born in the summer of 1442 in Zaragoza, Spain, in a family of low nobility. He was the son of Martin Cabrero and Inglesa Lopez de Quinto, who had three sons and two daughters. When Juan Cabrero was still a child, his older brother Martin was captured while he was combating the Ottoman Empire in the Fall of Constantinople in 1453, and apparently was made a slave and set free a few years later through a ransom. During his twenties Juan Cabrero participated as a captain of the Kingdom of Aragon's armies in the Catalan Civil War, and this is where he probably befriended Prince Ferdinand, who in 1477 appointed him as one of his house familiars. Cabrero married Maria Cortes, a widower from Zaragoza, but they never had any children. In 1482 Ferdinand the Catholic was already crowned king and sent Cabrero to recover the villages and castles of Chelva and Domeño which fell under Cabrero's control 4 months later. In 1486 the king appointed him Corregidor (royal delegate)of Alcaraz, one of the villages which was contributing with footmen and horsemen for the Siege of Malaga during the war against the Muslim Kingdom of Granada. In August 1487 Juan Cabrero was one of the captains of the King's household who secured the towers and gates of the city for the king, and that same year the king appointed him Corregidor of Lorca and Murcia. The two cities were used as a center of operations for the conquest of the city of Baza. Cabrero led hundreds of footmen and spear men and dozens of horsemen and crossbowmen to the villages of Cullar and Chercos which had been sieged by King Boabdil. During the second year of 1489 Cabrero participated in the Siege of Baza, both in logistics and commanding his company in battle.

== High Chamberlain ==
In May 1490 King Ferdinand rewarded his friend Juan Cabrero with the appointed of his personal High Chamberlain. This position had the duty of sleeping armed near the king, being aware of the secrets regarding the king's health, and following and making sure the king was well protected at any moment included in battle. The Chamberlain was one of the main 4 positions in the royal court, and was also in charge of the armory, of keeping the secret seal for the documents, and could also arrest and withhold salary of other court members. This high position was mainly in charge of the king's security and personal protection and well-being. Juan Cabrero was seasoned soldier and captain, and was one of the four main members of King Ferdinand's Secret Council, where battle plans and strategies for the Granada War were decided. The last stage of the Granada war moved the court to the fields of Santa Fe. The Catholic Monarchs had established a camp in those fields for the siege of Granada, and in December 1491 in that same camp is where they rejected Christopher Columbus's project for a second time.

== Episode with Christopher Columbus ==
In those camp of Santa Fe, once the Granada War was over, the monarchs changed their mind, and accepted the Indies enterprise. Historians have always considered Cabrero as one of the main factors on this decision based on 5 main accounts.

Columbus refers to Juan Cabrero in a letter to his son Diego in Dec 21 1504:

"You must inform promptly the archbishop of Palencia (Diego de Deza), for he was the cause that his Majesty have the Indies and that I would remain in Castile, for I was already on my way out, and on the same way to the Chamberlain of the King (Juan Cabrero)."

Just three weeks back Columbus had also written

"You must inform the Bishop of Palencia about all this, for I have so much trust in him, as I do in the Chamberlain."

In 1512 King Ferdinand referred to Cabrero in a letter to Diego Columbus regarding why he had given to Cabrero some slaves in encomiendas from the Indies:

"And you must know that I gave them to Juan Cabrero, my Chamberlain, because he worked for me to give the enterprise to the Admiral, your father."

The next account of Cabrero's role s from 1515 during the Colombian trials, Diego Colon sent a questionnaire to King Ferdinand, in which the questions narrate the succession of events that happened since his father arrived to Castile. In the first two points he referred to how the Catholic Monarchs though his project was impossible and laughed at it, how he was not listened for 7 years, and finally the monarchs assigned two archbishops (Talavera and Deza) to listen to his ideas. On point three and fourth Diego Columbus affirmed that "Those archbishops spoke with the Admiral many times, and after they saw his reasons, they and Juan Cabrero, Chamberlain of your Highness, said that they thought your Highness had to have this experience realized, even if some amount was spent on it, for the great benefit and honor that was expected to be found in those Indies. Forth item: After they presented this idea, your highness ordered to give a million of maravedies to the Admiral for the spending of his fleet that had to be built for discovering those lands, and there was a certain contract with the Admiral, and privileges were provided with it."

A grand nephew of Cabrero in 1517 assured that "the Chamberlain was the main cause behind the launching of the Indies enterprise, and its conquest, and if it would nt be for him, there would be no Indies, for the benefit of Castile. And about all this you can get informed by the Admiral (Diego Columbus) and by man others in this court."

== Later life and enrichment ==
Though Juan Cabrero had already been significantly rewarded by king Ferdinand before 1492, the numerous grants and royal benefits he was given from his friend the king from that year forward made him one of the most rewarded of Ferdinand's court members. That same year of 1492 the king gave him the Jewish Castle in Zaragoza's Jewish quarters, which Cabrero returned to the city council for a very high amount of maravedis. The king also granted him a bakery and a stable of horses in Zaragoza, payments from the bailiff of Aragon, and payments from the earnings of salt production in Naples.

Starting in 1501 the king granted him benefits related to the Order of St James. Cabrero was appointed commander of Totana, Aledo and Las Casas of Granada, and the important Encomienda mayor of Montalban. The king also appointed Cabrero as one of the Thirteen of Santiago, 13 members who were at the peak of the order and would choose the Great Master.

The chamberlain Cabrero was also granted incredible benefits regarding the Indies. He was in charge of payments for Columbus for the 4th voyage, and of the king's payments for other conquerors such as Enciso. The king also granted Cabrero 750 slaves in encomiendas for getting gold from the mines of Puerto Rico and the Hispaniola.

The king chose Juan Cabrero as his witness in his last will from 1512. During his last years Cabrero went blind, but the king still kept him as his chamberlain and close advisor. The chronicles refer to how the king deeply appreciated his friend Cabrero, and had someone help the chamberlain to a prepared chair in his royal chamber, where both would talk as the king was eating or changing his clothes. Cabrero died in 1514 at 70 years of age
