= Santa Fe, Granada =

Santa Fe
- Municipality
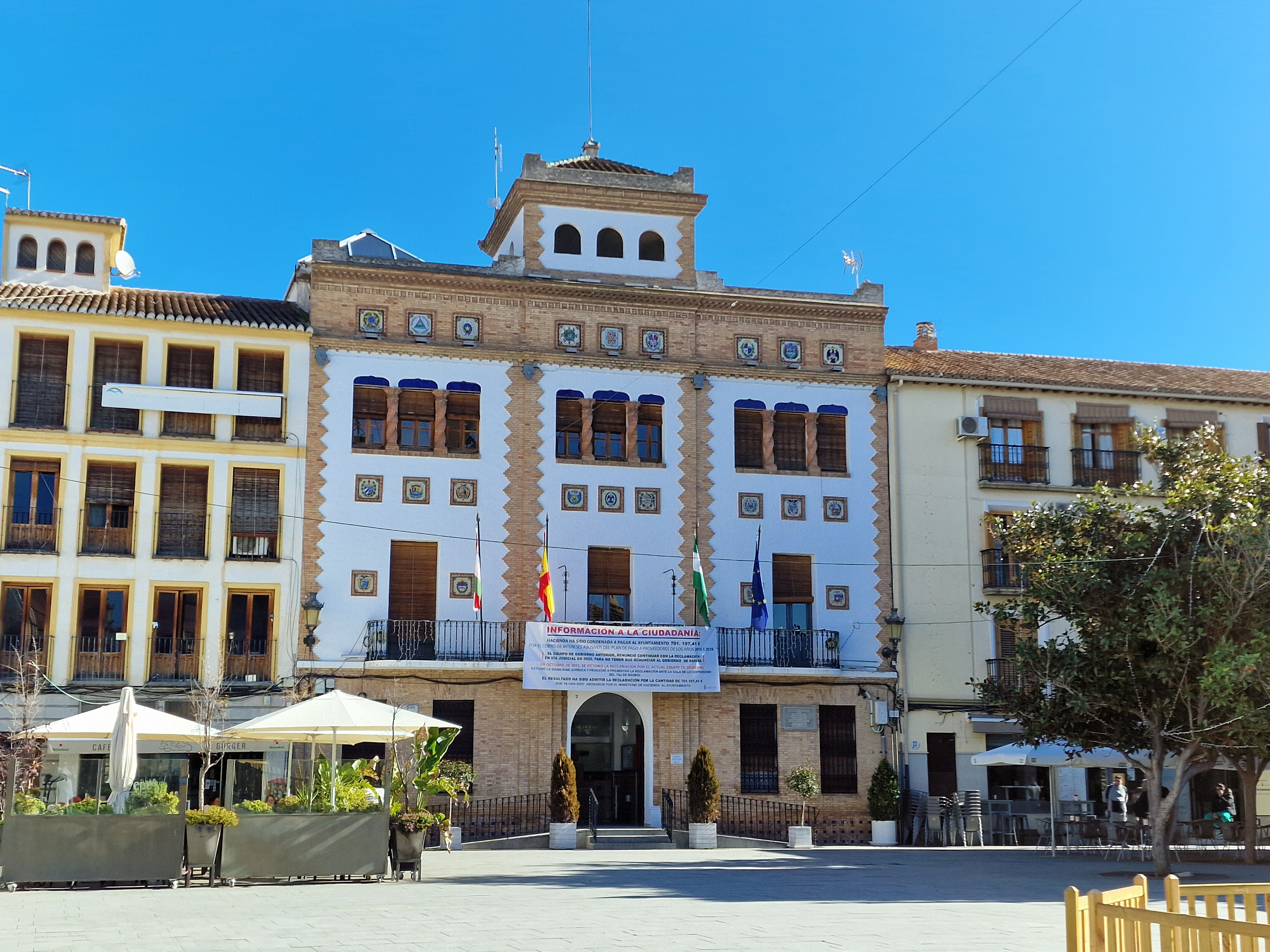

- Flag Coat of arms

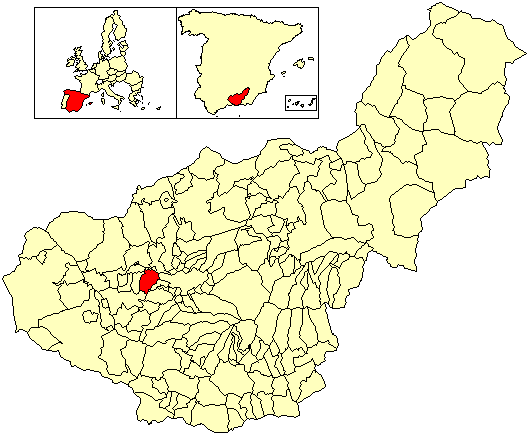
- Location of Santa Fe

- Location in Spain Santa Fe (Andalusia) Santa Fe (Spain)
- Coordinates: 37°11′21″N 3°43′4″W
- Country: Spain
- Autonomous community: Andalusia
- Province: Granada
- Comarca: Vega de Granada
- Judicial district: Santa Fe

Government
  - Alcalde: Juan Cobo Ortiz (2023) (PP)

Area
  - Total: 38.20 km^{2} (14.75 sq mi)
- Elevation: 582 m (1,909 ft)

Population (2025-01-01)
  - Total: 15,494
  - Density: 405.6/km^{2} (1,051/sq mi)
- Demonym(s): santaferino, -na
- Time zone: UTC+1 (CET)
  - Summer (DST): UTC+2 (CEST)
- Postal code: 18320
- Official language(s): Spanish
- Website: Official website

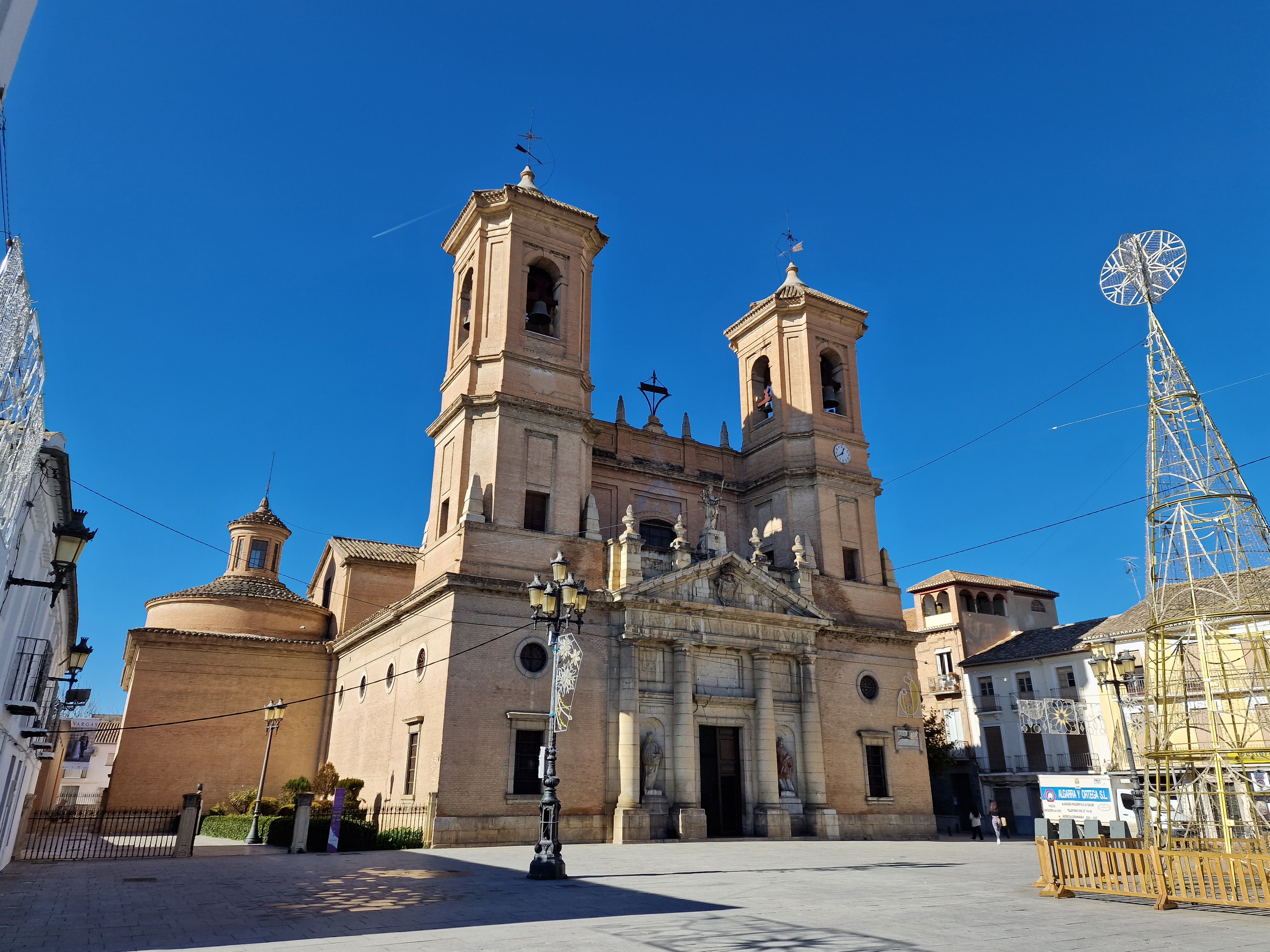
Church of Our Lady of the Incarnation, in Santa Fe

Santa Fe is a Spanish municipality in the province of Granada, situated in the Vega de Granada, irrigated by the river Genil. The town was originally built by the Catholic armies besieging Granada (c. 1490-1492) after a fire destroyed much of their encampment. The Capitulations of Santa Fe between Columbus and the Catholic Monarchs were signed there shortly after the fall of Granada (2 January 1492) on 17 April 1492, and the city therefore advertises itself as "the cradle of hispanicity".

The municipality is jointly-eponymous with Santa Fe, New Mexico, in the United States. Both cities feature a castle, lion, and the Spanish imperial eagle on their official seals and flags.

== International relations ==
=== Twin towns – sister cities ===
Santa Fe is twinned with:

- Vire-Normandie, France
- Santa Fe, New Mexico, United States
- Caguas, Puerto Rico, United States

== See also ==
- List of municipalities in Granada
