= Secretary of State (Ancient Regime in Spain) =

Former Executive Power in Spain

The Secretary of State or Secretary of State and of the Office was the title given in Spain to the King's ministers during the Ancient Regime of Spain, between the 17th century and the mid-19th century, when it was definitively replaced by the term "minister". It should be clarified that the Secretaries of State and of the Office of State, i.e. the heads of the Secretariat in charge of foreign affairs, were commonly known as Secretaries of State and, although they had the same rank as the other Secretaries of the Office, the Secretary of State assumed the leading role, presiding over the meetings of the ministers and attending to the most important matters.

Their origins lie in the secretaries of the 16th century Council of State, but with the reforms of Philip V, the polysynodial configuration of the Councils declined (with the exception of the Council of Castile), and it was the Secretary of State and of the Office that became the most important institution in the governmental structure, established for specific matters from 1714 onwards.

== Origins of the royal secretaries in the Crown of Castile ==
The germ of the office of the King's secretary or royal secretary arose at the beginning of the 14th century when, in the Cortes of Valladolid in 1312, Fernando IV established four chamber scribes to countersign and sign the mandates and graces issued directly by the monarch, thus transferring this task from the chancellors and senior notaries. With the establishment of the Trastámara dynasty in the middle of the 14th century, the first mentions of secretaries appear as the scribes who acted in the most private and personal sphere of the monarchs. Thus, in the reign of Henry II, Miguel Ruiz and in the reign of Henry III, Juan Martínez del Castillo stand out. During the reign of Henry III, institutional and diplomatic missions were added to the functions of the secretary, with Juan Rodríguez de Villaizán and Pedro Fernández de la Guardia standing out. These officials were not pecheros and were generally chosen from among the middle and lower nobility.

During the reign of John II, the main function of the secretaries was to dispatch all the documentation emanating from the king's chamber, which meant following the instructions of the king's will, ordering the documentation and preparing the documents, and once signed, being countersigned. In addition, in the formula of the documents signed by Fernán Díaz de Toledo (in the service of John II between 1421 and 1457), his status as secretary already appears as such. This formula continued with the royal secretaries of Henry IV.

== Secretaries of the Council of State in the origins of the polisinodial system ==
The victory of the Catholic Monarchs in the Civil War imposed the authority of monarchical power, so that the Royal Council of Castile, established in the Cortes of Valladolid (1385), was to be configured as an instrument of government and administration at the service of royal power as a result of the reforms undertaken in the Cortes of Toledo in 1480. This Royal Council would be in charge of advising on appointments and the granting of merits, of judicial tasks as the Court of Supreme Appeal of Castile and of supervising the government and administration of the kingdom. Its work was organized in five chambers: international affairs, justice, affairs of the kingdoms of the Crown of Aragon, Affairs of the Brotherhood and the Treasury.

With the complexity of the matters to be managed and the progressive increase of the dominions of the Monarchy, the distinction between the government of the Royal House and the territorial administration had to be clarified. The monarchs created boards of advisors to advise the king on a specific area, which would be the origin of the Councils. During the reigns of Charles I and Philip II, along with the Royal Council of Castile, councils were created to advise on territorial matters (Aragon, Navarre, Flanders, Portugal, the Indies, Italy) and to advise on specialized matters, such as the Council of Orders, the Crusade, the Treasury, the Inquisition, War and the Council of State. Of this polysynodial system of Councils, the Council of State was created in 1521 and organized in 1526 as a supraterritorial body to advise the monarch with undefined competences on any subject of interest to the monarch, but normally foreign policy and serious problems that could affect the Monarchy fell within its knowledge.

From the beginning of this system to the end of the 15th century, together with the members that formed part of each Council—the councilors—it was the king's private secretaries, at first without any jurisdiction or precise powers, who acquired the greatest influence in political and administrative decisions, since they were the ones who linked the king with the Councils. They advised him and executed his will, also summarized the matter of the consultation elaborated by the council, wrote down the decision of the monarch and drafted the resolution for the council, and as they had the confidence of the monarch, they took decisions on their own account at the expense of the competences of the Council without consulting the lawyers who composed the Councils. They also attended to the daily correspondence, prepared the documents with their orders and dispatched the petitions addressed to the king. The number of royal secretaries was left to the sovereign's discretion, and in fact the Ordenamiento de Montalvo does not indicate anything about a limited number of secretaries, neither in the monarch's chamber nor in the council. There was no hierarchy or distinction in the group of royal secretaries, either. Nevertheless, a greater specialization was seen in certain secretaries by virtue of their attention to international politics: Juan de Coloma, Miguel Pérez de Almazán (1498–1514), Pedro de Quintana (1514–1517) or Pedro Ruiz de la Mota (1517–1522). The Catholic Monarchs had six or seven secretaries, whose salaries were around one hundred thousand maravedies, although they accumulated more positions and perks—and other illegitimate incomes—which made them accumulate real fortunes. And they played a fundamental role in the organization of the Hispanic Monarchy.

For its part, each Council had its own secretaries dependent on the Council itself and with powers limited to matters within the competence of the council, and therefore did not necessarily have to have direct access to the monarch or dispatch with him. Therefore, the personal secretary of the king was the one who established the relationship between the king and the Councils. This secretary of the Council prepared the agenda, the records of the sessions, prepared the material to be studied by the king and the matters to be discussed by the councilors of the council, drafted and made summaries of memorials to the councilors to be presented during the deliberations, and drafted the result of the deliberations of the council (the consultation), which was the document to be submitted to the king's decision. But with the creation of the Council of State, presided over by the king himself, the secretary of the Council of State became directly dependent on the king and not on the council, thus acquiring a preponderant position over the councilors themselves. This made the secretary of the Council of State, called Secretary of State, a privileged figure and key character of the Administration and the spring of power throughout the Monarchy, since they had continuous access to the king and to the secrets of the Monarchy. This allowed the Secretary of State not only to limit themselves to executing the will of the king, but to enjoy the king's confidence to advise him and guide that will, without at any time being able to aspire to impose himself on the administrative authorities, since neither by birth nor by title could he claim such a thing, since they came from the urban patriciate.

== Apogee of the Council of State secretariat in the 16th century ==
During the reign of Charles I, after Jan Hannart, Viscount of Lombeck (1522–1524) and Jean Lallemand (Juan Alemán), Baron of Bouclans (1524–1528) occupied the secretarieships of the Council of State, Francisco de los Cobos (1529–1547) obtained the position, but in his position as private secretary to the king he accompanied him on his long stays outside Spain and so the dispatch of affairs in Spain had to be carried out by interims such as Juan Vázquez de Molina or Gonzalo Pérez. After the death of Francisco de los Cobos in 1547, the secretariat of the Council of State remained vacant for a decade during which Juan Vázquez de Molina held the post on an interim basis, controlling the levers of the Administration during the regencies established by Carlos I. With the abdication of Charles I in 1556, his son Philip II divided the secretariat of the Council of State: Juan Vázquez de Molina for the affairs of Spain in support of the regent Juana of Austria for the day-to-day management of the government, and Gonzalo Pérez for matters outside Spain.

Throughout 1558 the conflicts between the king's court established in Brussels and the regency established in Spain became more acute, which led to the decline of Vázquez de Molina's influence. Before his return to Spain —which took place in August 1559—, the king prepared his trusted personnel to defend his interests in enforcing his orders in the government, and thus appointed Francisco de Eraso to act as interim secretary of the Council of State for Spain when Vázquez de Molina was ill and could not do so himself. Vázquez de Molina accepted this situation and obtained the definitive license to retire in 1562, leaving Eraso in charge of the secretariat until his death in 1570. After the death of Gonzalo Pérez in 1566, his secretariat was occupied on an interim basis by Antonio Pérez and Gabriel de Zayas, and in 1567 Cardinal Diego de Espinosa, president of the Council of Castile, Inquisitor General and private of the king, remodeled the Council of State to strengthen the position of the learned to the detriment of the influence of the nobility, Zayas was appointed with the secretariat of the Council of State for the North ("all the affairs of State concerning the said embaxadas of the Court of the Emperor and kingdoms of France and England, and those that may be offered concerning and dependent on those parts"), and Perez with the secretariat of the Council of State for Italy ("all the business of State that may be offered concerning everything in Italy, both to the embaxada of Rome and the other potentates and ministers and our embaxadores of it"). This division was maintained until 1706.

The defeat and death of the Portuguese king in the battle of Alcazarquivir in 1578, supposed the Spanish king to opt for the Portuguese throne, to press and to affirm his aspirations with a military campaign required to leave in Madrid trustworthy personnel to guarantee a stable government, and given that the attitude of the monarch towards Antonio Perez was of distrust, his fall was imminent. In July 1579 he was arrested and in September Juan de Idiáquez y Olazábal was appointed secretary of the Council of State in the secretariat left by Zayas and also assumed at the same time the secretariat of Antonio Pérez. However, the king disposed of the confidence in his personal secretary Mateo Vázquez de Leca to intermediate between the relationship between the monarch and the secretary of the Council of State, which relegated the secretary of State to secondary positions.

The progressive deterioration of Philip II after 1585, led him to create a board to assist the monarch in the government of the Monarchy, examining consultations and correspondence issued by the various organs of the Monarchy and advising the king in their resolution, and in which Cristóbal de Moura will prefigure the figure of the valide by enjoying the confidence of the king to answer the consultations of the board or respond to royal orders. The Council of State, being supreme, did not have to be supervised by this board and therefore confidential matters that could have been within its competence were taken away from it. This meant that the secretary of the Council of State was limited to bureaucratic tasks and had no political influence over the king. In this state of affairs, Juan de Idiáquez prepared the succession of the Secretary of the council to his relatives: Martín de Idiáquez e Isasi was responsible for northern affairs (Flanders, France and Germany), and Francisco de Idiáquez for Italian affairs. The succession took place in the summer of 1587.

== Secretary of State and the Universal Office in the 17th century ==
The reign of Philip III brought an institutional transformation with the appearance of the valide, since the lack of dedication of the monarchs to the public affairs demanded the presence of a person that coordinated the governmental politics, that had the confidence of the monarch and the authority on the Councils, in the same way, the fall of the valide was produced by the loss of confidence of the king. This position could not be held by a secretary because of his low social extraction, but by someone from the aristocracy, but not from the highest nobility, although they were exalted by the position. As such, the valide exercised through a delegation of powers the intervention in political affairs, such as the resolution of consultations or supervision of the institutions, without being a mere transmitter of the orders of the monarch. At the same time, the distancing of the monarchs from public affairs meant that their popularity remained intact while the responsibilities of the exercise of power fell on the valide, and therefore, in case of strong opposition, the monarch had the possibility of replacing him with another.

Given that the Secretary of State had access to the secrets of the monarchy, the Valid avoided their competence and limited their influence by controlling the Council of State through his interference in the election of secretaries, as the example of Pedro Franqueza shows. This allowed the Valide to control the council and at the same time, the office of the Secretary of State would be with the Valide instead of with the monarch, and the Valide would be the one to dispatch by word of mouth with the King the political matters in progress; in this way the Secretary of State was limited to bureaucratic tasks within the Council of State and to deliver and receive the already elaborated documents, while the Valide remained the only intermediary between the King and the rest of the institutions. By means of the office by word of mouth, the secretary elaborated opinions and summaries of the consultations issued by the council, transmitted to the monarch those matters that required a response, and then would put down on paper the communication to the persons and institutions affected by those decisions, but when the valides took over the office by word of mouth they did it in the verbal communication, but, not being bureaucrats, did not take charge of the written documents, which was assumed through trusted personnel, given that the direct office of the valide with the king meant the disappearance of the monarch's private secretary. The imbalance with the disappearance of the king's private secretary came to be remedied in the reign of Philip IV.

At the beginning of the reign of Philip IV, his new valide, Gaspar de Guzman, will seek a better image of the monarch, avoiding an image of a monarch ruled by his favorite, that is why, to give the king greater visibility in the participation of the government and at the same time continue to maintain the valide the exclusivity in the intermediation between the king and the rest of institutions, he will take up again the figure of the private secretary to promote the bureaucratic work that the valid ones did not do regarding the handling of papers, such as the elaboration, amendments or resolutions to letters or documents. To achieve this, Gaspar de Guzmán entrusted the task of dispatching with the king to a single secretary to avoid undesirable contacts, and that his choice was controlled by the valide himself, so that the valide could control and filter the information that the king should know.

The assignment of this task, instead of creating a new post, one of the two secretaries of state would be chosen to be assigned to a secretariat with its own entity dedicated to attend to the dispatch of the monarch's papers, without mixing the two. In this sense, in 1630 the Secretariat of State for Spain ("of Spain, the Indies and adjacent islands, Barbary coasts and everything indifferent") was created over the other two (North and Italy), and although the initiative failed, since this secretariat was in force between 1630-1643 and 1648-1661 (its affairs being integrated into that of the North), however, the established functional practice of uniting the two secretariats (State and Office), created the institution of Secretary of State and the Universal Office until its division by the Royal Decree of July 11, 1705.

The reign of Charles II would put an end to the era of the Valides, and from then on the government would be directed by a prime minister, a person imposed on the king, and who therefore did not enjoy the confidence of the monarch, but had the support of some nobiliary faction. The king, even in spite of his attempts, did not assume the tasks of government, and in view of the situation of administrative disorder without an absolute political reference, the importance of the figure of the secretary of the Office will increase, as an intermediary between the king and the prime minister or the king's private secretary, and therefore the person who will have the most direct dealings with the king. Along with the work of the secretaries to present the affairs of the day to the monarch by reading and summarizing them and transmitting the answers to their addressees, he could receive confidential information reserved from different authorities without the knowledge of the Councils to expedite procedures and make payments with secret funds of the king; but ultimately their main task would be to process and expedite the bureaucratic documentation, in the basements of the palace, known as the covachuela.

== Bourbon Reform in the 18th century: Secretaries of State and of the Office ==
With the dynastic change, the Office with the new king Philip V was extended by disposition of his grandfather King Louis XIV of France with a Council of Office of chosen personages, who at the beginning were Manuel Arias y Porres, who was president of the Council of Castile, and Cardinal Portocarrero. In this way the King of France avoided an excessive influence of the Secretary of Office over the Spanish monarch and at the same time the King of France could control and supervise the government of the Spanish monarchy. Initially, to keep up appearances, the French ambassador Henri Harcourt dispatched with Cardinal Portocarrero separately. This Council of Office controlled the dispatch with the monarch. In 1704, after the loss of Gibraltar, the Council de Office was reformed and enlarged with Manuel Arias, José de Solís y Valderrábano, new president of the Council of Castile, Juan Domingo de Haro, president of the Council of Flanders, Antonio Sebastián de Toledo Molina y Salazar, president of the Council of Italy and the French ambassador Antonio Carlos de Gramont, in addition to the king and the secretary of Office Antonio de Ubilla. At the end of January 1705 Pedro Fernández del Campo was appointed as the new Secretary of the Office, and since it was impossible for this newcomer to efficiently carry out all the bureaucratic work, the king established in the Royal Decree of July 11, 1705 the division of the secretariat into two distinct offices according to the demands of government to win the War of Succession: the affairs of War and Finance fell to José de Grimaldo, while "everything else of any matter" (primarily justice and ecclesiastical affairs) remained with Pedro Fernández del Campo. However, the Council of Office can in no way be considered the predecessor of the Council of Ministers, since it was an advisory body in which there was no division of competences among its members and which was dissolved in 1715. The year 1714 saw the death of Queen Maria Luisa Gabriela of Savoy in February and the return of Jean Orry to Spain at the end of April, which brought about some administrative changes: the Secretary of the Office Pedro Fernandez del Campo was replaced by Manuel Vadillo and the Royal Decree of November 30, 1714 implemented the French ministerial system, establishing four secretaries of the Office:

- Office of State and negotiation of ministers and foreign affairs, in charge of foreign affairs, for José Grimaldo;
- Office of Ecclesiastical Affairs, justice and jurisdiction, in charge of ecclesiastical affairs, the maintenance of the royalties of the Crown, the regime of the universities, and the justice and jurisdiction of Councils and courts, especially in appointments, for Manuel Vadillo;
- Office of War, in charge of military affairs, for Miguel Fernández Durán;
- Office of Navy and the Indies, in charge of naval affairs and America, for Bernardo Tinajero de la Escalera.

Jean Orry, the architect of the reform, was left in charge of a General Overseer's Office for Treasury affairs that supervised the whole administration, controlling the expenses, and in addition, the Overseer's Office had a general intendant who assisted him in order to facilitate the opinions to the rest of the secretaries, and who was Lorenzo Armengual de la Mota. The Decree of 1714 also established a Cabinet Council, in which the secretaries were integrated, although it is not known if it formed a separate Council or if they were integrated into the pre-existing Council of Office; however, the life of this Council ended with the fall of Orry at the beginning of 1715, so that Giulio Alberoni cut off the dispatch of the secretaries with the king and thus controlled the remaining secretaries.

The new Secretaries of the Office accumulated the attributions of the Secretaries of State (of the Council of State) of the 16th century as liaisons between the Councils and the King, to those of the Secretaries of the Universal Office of the 17th century as channelers of the monarch's communications, thus adding the prestige of the title of Secretary of State to any secretary who entered the Office with the monarch, becoming the first figures of the Administration to control the whole of the administrative apparatus. It was not until the Royal Decree of November 30, 1714 that the figure of Secretary of State and of the Office was institutionalized, a generic title for the minister to which was added the specific department over which the office was exercised. Thus, the Minister of War was the Secretary of State and of the Office of War, or the Minister of State was the Secretary of State and of the Office of State, also called Secretary of the Office of State, and from 1734, as the first Secretary of State, since in fact, the Secretary of the Office of State was the one who would stand out above all the others as the highest-ranking matters passed through his hands. The Secretaries of State and of the Office were the origin of the ministers, in charge of a specific department and with a professional bureaucracy at their disposal, with their work they went from bureaucrats to political figures. The Secretaries of State and of the Office had privileged access to the monarch, having direct communication with him, which meant, to resolve and decide with the king, as well as to put in writing those verbal resolutions to give them course. The dispatch with the king was done regularly and directly with the monarch and in a reserved manner, and the secretaries also assumed the attributions of the old Councils, as well as the control of their personnel, without undermining the specific competences of the Council of Castile regarding the courts of Justice and Internal Government, as well as the collaboration with the king in the legislative process (being the only Council with legislative function).

On February 7, 1715, Orry was dismissed and on April 28, 1715, another new reform in the Secretariats of the Office took place: the General Overseer was suppressed, which was integrated into the Intendencia General converted into an Office of Treasury or office of the Intendente General, in which Lorenzo Armengual de la Mota was kept; the Office of Navy and Indias was also suppressed and its affairs were divided among the three Secretariats of War, State and Justice. When Cardinal Giulio Alberoni was the new influential man in the Court the Royal Decree of April 2, 1717 arose, which produced another new reorganization of the Universal Office, which was divided between:

- State and Foreign Affairs (with Grimaldo);
- War, Navy and Justice of Spain and the Indies (with José Rodrigo y Villalpando),
- Political Government and Treasury of Spain and the Indies (with Manuel Fernández Durán).

After the fall of Alberoni in December 1719, another new reorganization took place on December 1, 1720, with the secretariats of:

- State, with José Grimaldo;
- War, Navy and the Indies (except for ecclesiastical matters), with Miguel Fernández Durán,
- Treasury, with Juan de Dios del Río González,
- Justice and Political Government (with the ecclesiastical of the Indies), with José Rodrigo.

With the fall of Fernández Durán, a new reorganization took place when his Secretariat was divided into two: on the one hand, War, and on the other, the Navy and the Indies, leaving the organization in the five specialized and differentiated Secretaries of the Office until the 19th century, although it happened that the same person simultaneously occupied two or more Secretariats, as in the case of José Patiño Rosales, José del Campillo y Cossío, Zenón de Somodevilla, or Leopoldo de Gregorio.

It was not until the reign of Ferdinand VI when the distribution of competencies among five secretariats ("State", "Grace and Justice", "Navy and the Indies", "Treasury" and "War") took place: the State Secretariat by Royal Decree of May 15, 1754 and the remaining ones by Royal Decree of August 26, 1754. Only between the Royal Decree of July 8, 1787 and that of April 25, 1790, the number of Secretariats was fixed at seven: "State", "Grace and Justice of Spain", "Navy", "War", "Treasury", "Grace and Justice of the Indies" and "Commerce and Navigation of the Indies", which returned to five in 1790, considering the creation of sections of the Indies in the other Secretariats so that they would deal with both Spanish and Indian affairs in an undifferentiated manner: "Grace and Justice of the Indies" was assimilated to that of Spain, " Commerce and Navigation of the Indies" was divided between War, Treasury and Navy.

The five Secretariats of State and of the Office were maintained during the rest of the monarchical absolutism. Only at the end of the reign of Ferdinand VII was the Ministry of General Development of the Kingdom incorporated. The creation of this ministry arose from a need, expressed by Sáinz de Andino, which was "for the direct purpose of preserving order, the common security of the State, the good regime of the things of common use and the play of the action of the Government in everything that states order to the promotion and common prosperity of the people". The establishment of the Secretariat of State and the Office of General Development of the Kingdom by the royal decree of November 5, 1832, reduced the Office of State to foreign relations, while the new ministry was attributed the internal government, which included public instruction, printing and newspapers, whether belonging to the Government or to private individuals, or the Royal Academies and Royal Archives.

The absolute government of the monarch was interrupted with the implementation of the Statute of Bayonne and the Constitution of 1812, which modified the ministerial structure; article 27 of the Constitution of Bayonne of 1808 established nine ministries: a Ministry of Justice, another of Ecclesiastical Business, another of Foreign Business, another of the Interior, another of the Treasury, another of War, another of the Navy, another of the Indies and another of General Police; and article 222 of the Constitution of 1812 established seven secretaries of the office: For the Office of State, the Office of the Interior of the Kingdom for the Peninsula and adjacent Islands, the Office of the Interior of the Kingdom for Overseas, the Office of Grace and Justice, the Office of the Treasury, the Office of War, and the Office of the Navy.

During the reign of Charles III, the novelty of the collective office was introduced with the creation by royal decree of July 8, 1787 of the Junta Suprema de Estado (Supreme Board of the State), an institutionalized meeting of all the secretaries to deliberate on matters that went beyond the scope of each secretariat. It was dissolved by decree of February 28, 1792 after the fall of the Count of Floridablanca. It would not be until the royal decree of November 19, 1823, when the Council of Ministers or cabinet, presided over by a president of the council (or head of government), was definitively constituted.

== See also ==
- Valide
- List of prime ministers of Spain
- Ancient Regime of Spain
