= Jean Orry =

French economist

General Treasury Overseer of Bourbon Spain
- In office 30 November 1714 – 15 May 1715
- Monarch: Philip V
- Secretary of the Universal Bureau: José de Grimaldo
- Preceded by: José de Grimado (as Secretary of State of War and Tresury)
- Succeeded by: Marquess of Vadillo (as General Superintendent of the Treasury)

Personal details
- Born: Jean Louis Orry; 4 September 1652
- Died: 29 September 1719 (aged 67) Paris

Jean Orry (4 September 1652 – 29 September 1719) was a French economist.

== Life ==
=== Early career ===
Jean Orry was born in Paris on 4 September 1652 to Charles Orry, a merchant, and Madelaine le Cosquyno.

Orry studied law and entered Royal service as a lawyer, becoming a munitioneer for the army of Italy between 1690 and 1698, where he was able to demonstrate his skill at planning and organisation. In 1701, at the start of the War of the Spanish Succession, Orry purchased his nobility and became an adviser to Louis XIV.

=== Work in Spain ===
Orry was sent to Spain by King Louis in 1701. There, Orry joined the self-styled Princesse des Ursins as the de facto rulers of Spain. Towards the end of his term there, by a royal decree composed by Orry on 23 December 1713, traditional local governments (the Cortes) were centralized by the creation of twenty-one provinces. These Consejos Territoriales were superseded by an intendant directly responsible to Orry. Some of the local councils, such as the Council of Castile retained influence through less direct channels.

=== Dismissal from Spain ===
Orry was dismissed through pressures brought to bear by the Parmesan contingent round the new queen, Elisabetta Farnese, and Giulio Alberoni. Orry was ordered from Spain on 7 February 1715. The King signed the Decreto de Nueva Planta later that year, revoking most of the historical rights and privileges of the different kingdoms that conformed the Spanish Crown, unifying them under the laws of Castile, where the Cortes regained some of its power.

=== Legacy ===
Giulio Alberoni, the cardinal who succeeded him in power, continued the main lines of his financial reorganization and his repression of the power of the royal councils in favour of a bureaucracy wholly dependent upon the central power. Orry's creation of secretaries of state and intendants continued as a significant element in Spanish governmental administration.

== See also ==
- Bourbon Reforms

== Bibliography ==
- Crowley, Patrick (2002). Before and beyond EMU historical lessons and future prospects. Routledge. ISBN 1134458053.
- Frey, Linda; Frey, Marsha (1995). The treaties of the War of the Spanish Succession : an historical and critical dictionary. Greenwood Press. ISBN 0313278849.
- Kuethe, Allan; Andrien, Kenneth (2014). The Spanish Atlantic world in the eighteenth century : war and the Bourbon reforms, 1713-1796. Cambridge: Cambridge University Press. ISBN 978-1107043572.
- Hargreaves-Mawdsley, W.N. (1979). Eighteenth-Century Spain 1700–1788: A Political, Diplomatic and Institutional History. Springer Publishing. ISBN 1349018031.
- Ozanam, Denise (1989). Jean Orry, munitionnaire du roi, 1690-1698. Imprimerie Nationale.
- Sanchez, Rafael (2016). Military entrepreneurs and the Spanish contractor state in the eighteenth century. Oxford: Oxford University Press. ISBN 978-0198784111.
