= Giulio Alberoni =

Italian cardinal and statesman (1664–1752)

His Eminence Giulio Alberoni
- Cardinal-Priest of San Lorenzo in Lucina
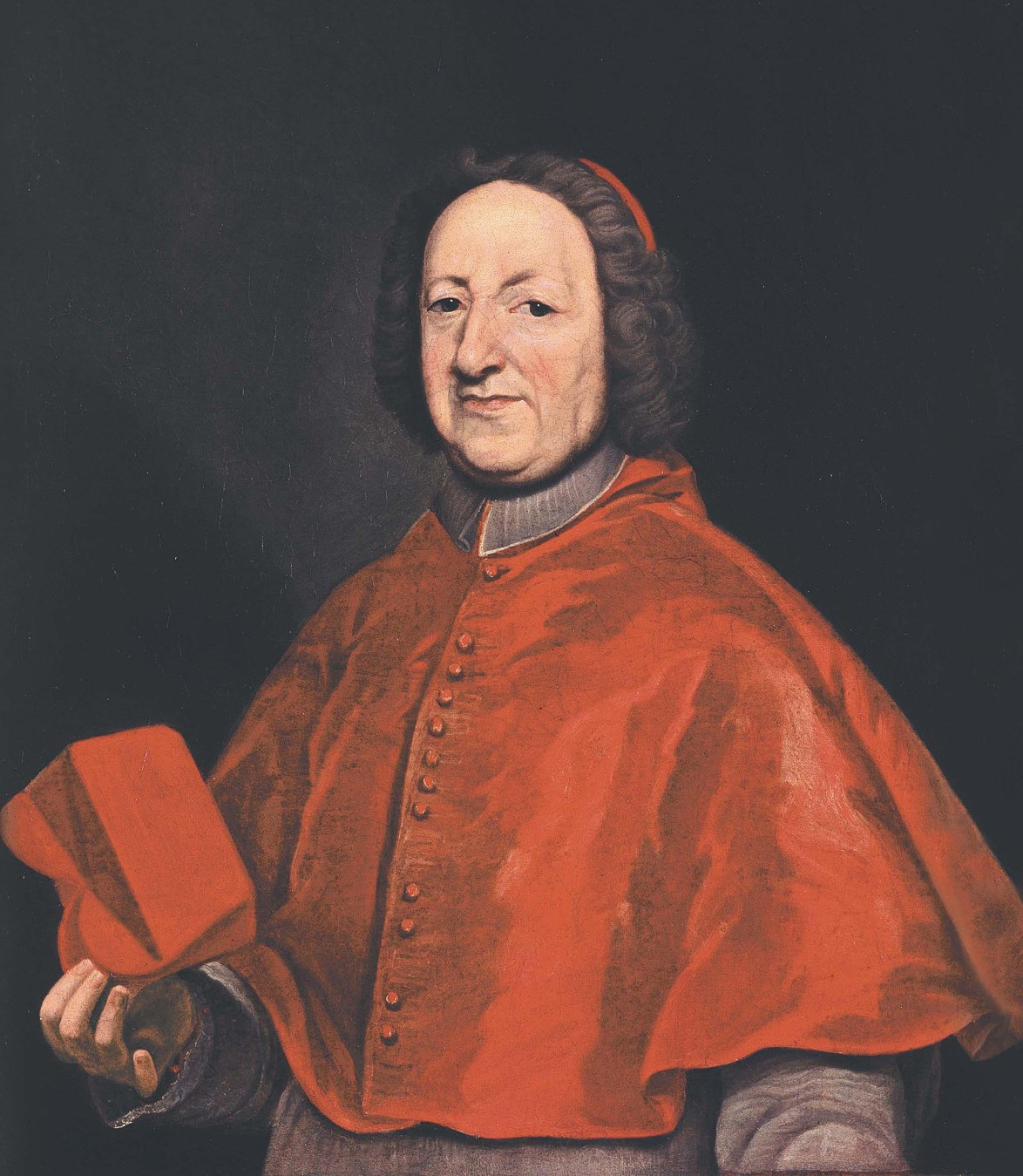
- Portrait by Giovanni Maria delle Piane
- Church: Catholic Church
- Appointed: 29 August 1740
- Term ended: 26 June 1752
- Predecessor: Gianantonio Davia
- Successor: Thomas de Hénin-Liétard
- Previous posts: Bishop of Málaga (1717–1725); Cardinal-Deacon of Sant'Adriano al Foro (1724–1728); Cardinal-Priest of San Crisogono (1728–1740)

Orders
- Ordination: 1690 by Giorgio Barni
- Consecration: 18 November 1725 by Pope Benedict XIII
- Created cardinal: 12 July 1717 by Pope Clement XI
- Rank: Cardinal-Priest

Personal details
- Born: 21 May 1664 Fiorenzuola d'Arda, Duchy of Parma
- Died: 26 July 1752 (aged 88) Piacenza, Italy

- Coat of arms

Giulio Alberoni (21 May 1664 OS – 26 June NS 1752) was an Italian cardinal and statesman in the service of Philip V of Spain.

== Early years ==
He was born near Piacenza on May 21, 1664, probably at the village of Fiorenzuola d'Arda in the Duchy of Parma.

His father, who was a gardener, died when Alberoni was only ten years old. He himself became first connected with the church in the humble position of a bellringer and verger in the Duomo of Piacenza; he was twenty-one when the judge Ignazio Gardini, of Ravenna, was banished, and he followed Gardini to Ravenna, where he met the vice-legate Giorgio Barni, who was made bishop of Piacenza in 1688 and appointed Alberoni chamberlain of his household. Alberoni took priest's orders, having been ordained in the Cathedral of Parma, and afterwards accompanied the nephew of the Bishop of Parma to Rome but returned to Parma two years later to be a canon of the cathedral chapter.

During the War of the Spanish Succession, Alberoni laid the foundation of his political success by the services he rendered to Louis-Joseph, duc de Vendôme, commander of the French forces in Italy, to whom the Duke of Parma had sent him. When the French forces were recalled in 1706, he accompanied the duke to Paris, where he was favourably received by Louis XIV.

== Middle years ==
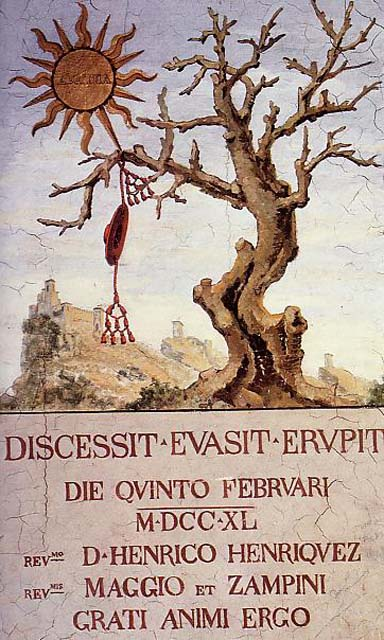
Anti-Alberoni fresco, from the Palace San Marino

When Vendôme was defeated by Marlborough at the Battle of Oudenarde in 1708, Alberoni was able to convince the Duke of Alba—the Spanish ambassador to the French court—to place Vendôme in charge of Spanish forces by 1710. Alberoni accompanied Vendôme to Spain as his secretary and became very active in promoting the cause of the French candidate Philip V. Following Vendôme's death, in 1713, he was made a Count and appointed Consular agent for Parma at Philip's court where he was a Royal favourite.

Under the terms of the 1713 Treaty of Utrecht, Philip became King of Spain but the Spanish Empire was effectively partitioned. The Southern Netherlands and their Italian possessions were ceded to the Austrian Habsburgs and Savoy, Menorca, and Gibraltar went to Britain, while British merchants gained trading rights in the previously closed market of the Spanish Americas.

At this time, the key powerbroker at the Spanish court was Marie-Anne de la Trémoille, princesse des Ursins who dominated Phillip and his wife Maria Luisa of Savoy. Alberoni worked with her and when Maria Luisa died in 1714 they arranged for Philip to marry Elisabetta Farnese, daughter of the Duke of Parma.

Elisabetta was a strong personality herself and formed an alliance with Alberoni, their first action being to banish the Princesse des Ursins. By the end of 1715, Alberoni had been made a Duke and Grandee of Spain, a member of the King's council, Bishop of Málaga and Chief Minister of the Hispanic Monarchy. In July 1717, Pope Clement XI appointed him a Cardinal Deacon, allegedly because of his assistance in resolving several ecclesiastical disputes between Rome and Madrid in favour of Rome.

One outcome of the war was to reduce the powers of Castile and Aragon and create a Spanish state similar to the centralised French system. This allowed Alberoni to copy the economic reforms of Colbert and he passed a series of decrees aimed at restoring the Spanish economy. These abolished internal custom-houses, promoted trade with the Americas, instituted a regular mail service to the colonies and reorganised state finances along lines established by the French economist Jean Orry. Some attempts were made to satisfy Spanish conservatives e.g. a new School of Navigation was reserved for the sons of the nobility.

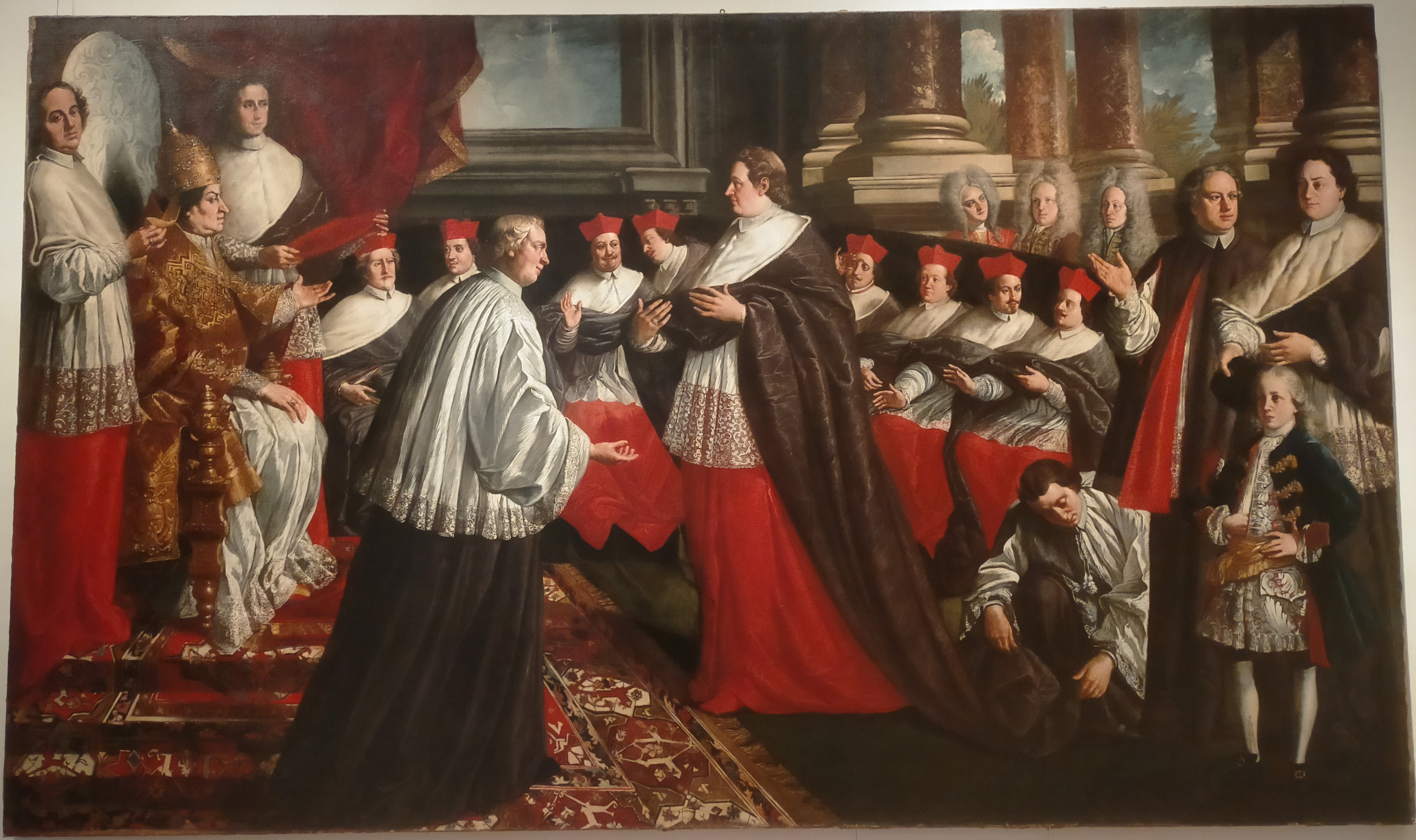
Pier Leone Ghezzi – Pope Clement XI confers the cardinal's hat to Giulio Alberoni, oil on canvas 1724, Museum of Rome.

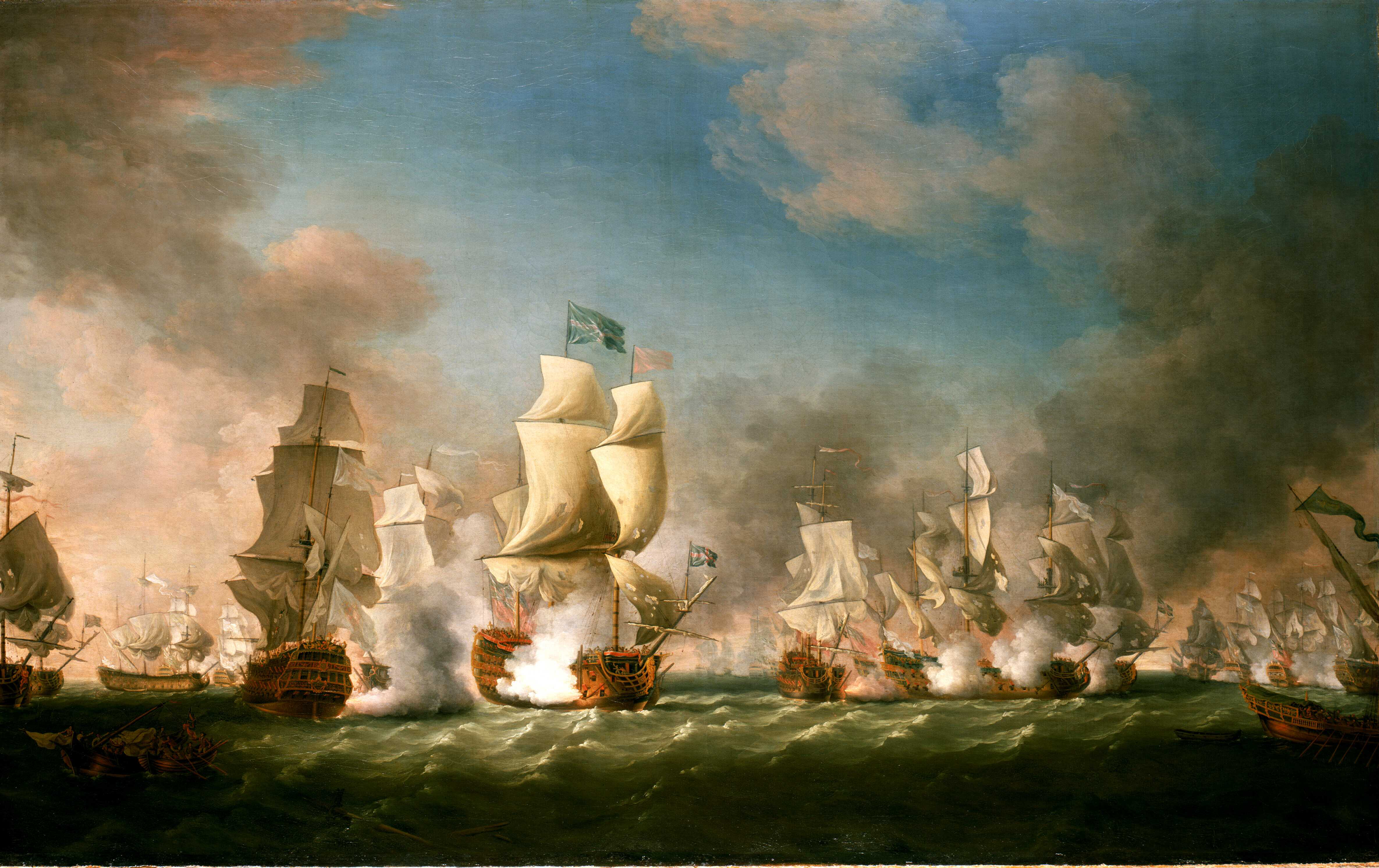
Battle of Cape Passaro, 11 August 1718; the destruction of the Spanish fleet off Sicily

These reforms made Spain confident enough to attempt the recovery of territories in Italy ceded to Savoy and Charles VI of Austria. In 1717, a Spanish force occupied Sardinia unopposed; neither Austria or Savoy had significant naval forces and Austria was engaged in the Austro-Turkish War of 1716–18. This assumed the British would not intervene but when 38,000 Spanish troops landed on Sicily in 1718, Britain declared it a violation of the Peace of Utrecht. On 2 August 1718, Britain, France, the Netherlands and the Austrians formed the Quadruple Alliance and on 11 August the Royal Navy destroyed a Spanish fleet off Sicily at the Battle of Cape Passaro.

Alberoni now attempted to offset British in the Mediterranean by sponsoring a Jacobite landing to divert their naval resources; he also sought to end the 1716 Anglo-French Alliance by using the Cellamare conspiracy to replace the current French Regent the Duke of Orleans with Phillip of Spain. However, he failed to appreciate that Britain was now powerful enough to maintain naval superiority in the Mediterranean and the Atlantic while France declared war on Spain in December 1718 on the discovery of the Conspiracy.

France invaded eastern Spain and in October 1719 a British naval expedition captured the Spanish port of Vigo; they landed 6,000 troops, held Vigo for ten days, destroyed vast quantities of stores and equipment and then re-embarked unopposed. The nearby city of Santiago de Compostela even paid £40,000 in return for being left alone. As intended, this was a crushing demonstration of British naval power and showed the Spanish Britain could land anywhere along their coastline and leave when they wanted to. The failure of his policy meant Alberoni was dismissed on 5 December 1719 and ordered to leave Spain, with the Treaty of The Hague in 1720 confirming the outcome of Utrecht. In an effort to persuade the Pope to depose Alberoni, charges were laid against him: failures in chastity, not wearing appropriate clerical dress, and not having said Mass for years.

== Later years ==
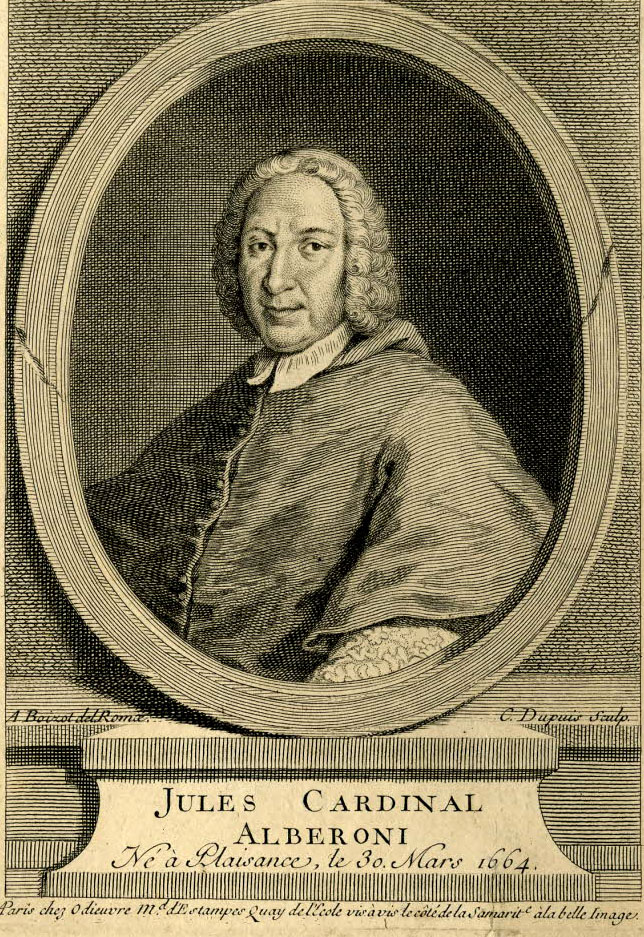
Engraving of Cardinal Alberoni

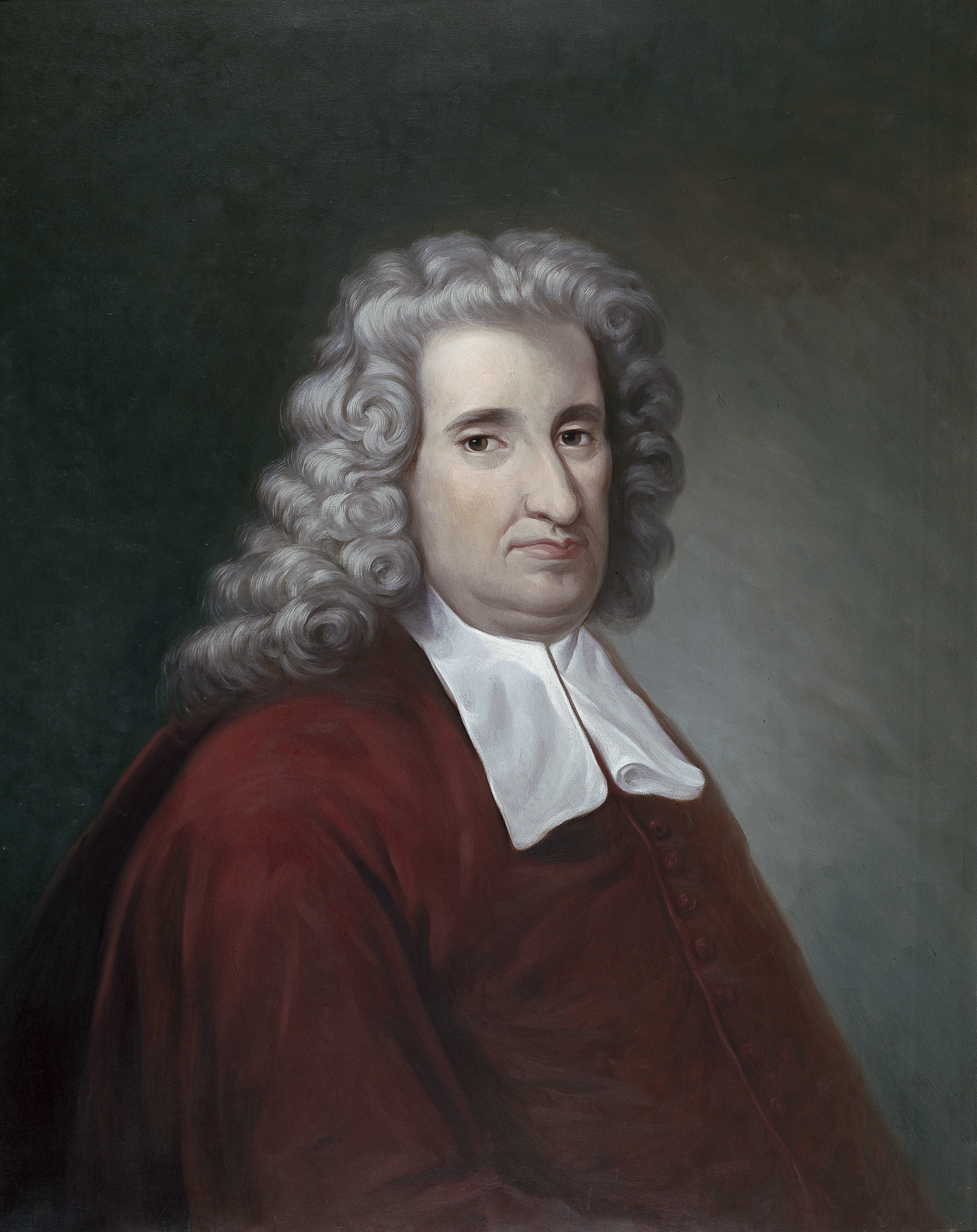
Cardinal Giulio Alberoni

Alberoni followed the order and left Spain for Italy. At Lleida, his belongings were searched to ensure that no state papers were in his possession. After leaving Barcelona, he was plundered by bandits. His baggage was again searched at Narbonne, by Customs officers under orders from the Chevalier de Marcieu, who had been ordered by the Regent of France to accompany Alberoni and extract whatever information he could from the Cardinal. Sailing for Italy, he was met at Sestri Levante in Genoese territory by a papal official, who forbade his entry into the Papal States, on penalty of imprisonment. When Alberoni retreated to Genoa, the Emperor and the Pope each tried to have him detained. On 19 March 1720, Clement XI appointed a Commission of Cardinals to try Alberoni: Albani, Astalli, Barberini, Bentivoglio, Conti, Corradini, Corsini, Fabroni, Paracciani, Paolucci, Scotti, Tanara, Tolomei, Vallemani, and Zondadari; they were joined by three other prelates: Alamanni, Marefoschi and Riviera. He escaped from arrest at Genoa, as the Genoese allowed him to go on his way, and found refuge at Castelnuovo Scrivia, in Austrian territory in Lombardy. On the death of Clement in 1721, Alberoni boldly appeared at the conclave, and took part in the election of Innocent XIII (The cardinals voted to allow Alberoni to participate, but many of them refused to have anything to do with him personally), after which he was for a short time imprisoned in a monastery by the new pontiff on the demand of Spain on charges including sodomy (Elizabeth Charlotte of the Palatine noted in her diaries that he was a pederast). He was ultimately cleared by a commission of his fellow Cardinals. At the conclave that would elect Pope Benedict XIII (1724), Alberoni had been himself proposed for the papal chair and secured ten votes. Alberoni received the titular church Sant'Adriano al Foro (a cardinal-deaconry) in 1724, and then was made Cardinal Priest of San Crisogono in 1728.

Benedict's successor, Clement XII (elected 1730), named him legate of Ravenna, where he erected the Porta Alberoni (1739), a magnificent gateway that formerly provided access to the city's dockyards, and has since been moved to the entrance of the Teatro Rasi. That same year, the strong and unwarrantable measures he adopted to subject the grand republic of San Marino to the papal states incurred the pope's displeasure and left a historical scar in that place's memory. He was soon replaced by another legate in 1740, the same year he was made Cardinal Protector of San Lorenzo in Lucina. He retired to Piacenza, where in 1730 Clement XII appointed him administrator of the hospital of San Lazzaro, an institute founded in the medieval era for the benefit of lepers. Since leprosy had nearly disappeared in Italy, Alberoni obtained the consent of the pope to suppress the hospital, which had fallen into great disorder, and replaced it with a seminary for the priestly education of seventy poor boys, under the name of the Collegio Alberoni, which it still bears. Collegio Alberoni's graduates include remarkable prelates such as Agostino Casaroli, Silvio Oddi, and Antonio Samorè.

== Death and legacy ==
He died on 26 June 1752, leaving a sum of 600,000 ducats to endow the seminary he had founded. He left the rest of the immense wealth he had acquired in Spain to his nephew. Alberoni produced many manuscripts. The genuineness of the Political Testament, published in his name at Lausanne in 1753, has been questioned.

The Cardinal's collections of art gathered in Rome and Piacenza, housed in his richly appointed private apartments, have been augmented by the Collegio. There are remarkable suites of Flemish tapestries, and paintings, among which the most famous is the Ecce Homo by Antonello da Messina (1473), but which also include panels by Jan Provoost and other Flemish artists, oil paintings by Domenico Maria Viani and Francesco Solimena.

Alberoni was a gourmand. Interspersed in his official correspondence with Parma are requests for local delicacies triffole (truffles), salame, robiola cheeses, and agnolini (kind of pasta). The pork dish "Coppa del Cardinale", a specialty of Piacenza, is named for him. A "timballo Alberoni" combines maccaroni, shrimp sauce, mushrooms, butter and cheese.

== References and sources ==
Sources

- Harcourt-Smith, Simon (1955). Cardinal of Spain: the Life and Strange Career of Giulio Alberoni. New York: Knopf.
- Kuethe, Allan J. "Cardinal Alberoni and Reform in the American Empire." in Francisco A. Eissa-Barroso y Ainara Vázquez Varela, eds. Early Bourbon Spanish America. Politics and Society in a forgotten Era (1700–1759) (Brill, 2013): 23–38.
- Catholic Encyclopedia: Giulio Alberoni
- Catholic Hierarchy: Giulio Cardinal Alberoni
- Cardinals of the Holy Roman Church: Conclave of 31 March – 8 May 1724
- Collegio Alberoni, Piacenza
- The San Marino event of 1739–40
