= Abu Ibrahim ibn Barun =

Rabbi Yitzhak ben Barun ben Yosef Benveniste (Hebrew: יצחק בן ברון בן יוסף בנבנשת), also known by his Arabic name Abū Ibrahīm Iṣḥāq ibn Barūn (died 1128 in Málaga) was an 11th-century Spanish grammarian of Arabic and Hebrew, mainly known for his influential book entitled The Book of Comparison between the Hebrew and the Arabic Languages, in which he traces parallels between hundreds of Arabic and Hebrew words. He was a pupil of Rabbi Levi ibn Altabban. He was highly revered by his friends and successors, the Hebrew poets and grammarians Moses ibn Ezra and Judah Halevi, who had both written poems in his honour.
