= Commentary of Ibn Ezra =

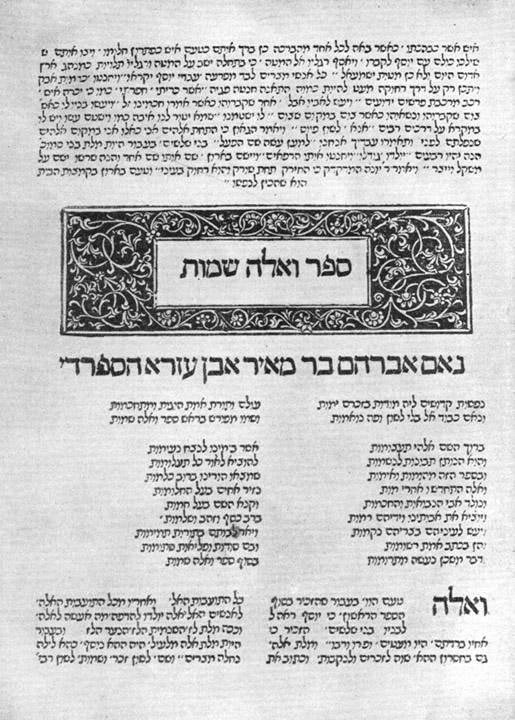
The beginning of Ibn Ezra's commentary on the Book of Exodus. Manuscript from Naples, 1488

Ibn Ezra's Commentary (Hebrew: פירוש אבן עזרא) is a commentary on the Bible written by Rabbi Abraham ibn Ezra during the 12th century, and it constitutes one of the most important commentaries ever written on the Bible. It was printed in the overwhelming majority of versions of the Mikraot Gedolot of the Bible, and over one hundred commentaries were written on it. His commentaries on the books of: the Torah, the Five Scrolls, Isaiah, the Twelve Minor Prophets, Psalms, Job and Daniel are extant, while two commentaries attributed to him, on the Book of Proverbs and the Book of Ezra–Nehemiah, are not his and were written by Rabbi Moses Kimhi. Ibn Ezra mentions his commentaries on the Former Prophets and Proverbs, but they have not reached us.

Two main sets of commentaries by him have survived on the Pentateuch. His commentaries are very similar in most cases, but sometimes also diverge. One of the commentaries is longer in relation to the amount of commentary, and of it only Exodus and the first part of Genesis have survived, whereas from the other commentary, shorter in most cases, several editions have survived from different periods of Ibn Ezra's life, the commentary on the whole Torah.

In his long introduction to his commentary on the Torah, Ibn Ezra explains his unique method in interpreting Scripture. He aspired to find the plain meaning (peshat) of each verse and to separate it from the homiletical interpretation (derash) of the verse. From this aspiration, Ibn Ezra confronts throughout his commentary on the Torah the interpretations of different commentators from the whole spectrum of biblical exegesis, beginning with the Sages in Midrash and Talmud and ending with the interpretations of the scholars of the Karaites. Regarding some of them he claimed that they were derash and not the peshat of the verse, while against others he claimed that they were not the true peshat of the verse. Nevertheless, Ibn Ezra accepted that in practice the law is carried out according to the homiletical interpretations of the Sages.

Ibn Ezra wrote his commentary on the Torah in a short, concise and poetic style, and this is one of the reasons for the commentary being difficult to understand. Another reason is the commentary's abundance of secrets, and many times the reader is given only a hint for understanding the verse, in addition to the note "and there is a secret in it" or "and the enlightened will understand." Many of the opening phrases contain only a few words and sometimes even a single word. Nevertheless, in places where he mentioned a fundamental matter, Ibn Ezra expanded even over several pages on a single opening phrase.

Another prominent element in his commentary, aside from the aspiration to the level of peshat, is Hebrew linguistics. Many of Ibn Ezra's interpretations deal with linguistic matters, with the explanation of words and unique grammatical rules in the language of the Bible. From their scope and content, Ibn Ezra's deep understanding of linguistics is also reflected.

The Ra’avad sharply attacks earlier commentators who in his opinion erred in the explanation of the text. Among those attacked are well-known commentators such as Rabbi Samuel ha-Nagid, Rabbi Saadia Gaon, Rabbi Samuel ben Hofni and others. Many others Ibn Ezra criticizes without stating their names, but rather calls those criticized "there are those who say" or similar words.

Ibn Ezra directed his criticism mainly at Rabbi Saadia Gaon and at Rabbi Moses. Rashi he mentioned only a few times. From the words of Ibn Ezra emerges a picture according to which he held Rashi in great respect but disagreed much with his interpretation.

== Background to the Writing of the Commentary ==
Ibn Ezra was born in the city of Tudela in Muslim Spain. In Spain he wrote many poems and books, most of them in Arabic, and his writings in Arabic have not survived, Around the age of forty Ibn Ezra was forced to leave Spain for an unknown reason and began to wander throughout Europe. Due to his move to Europe, Ibn Ezra encountered a different readership, which was not familiar with Greek and Arabic sciences and approached the study of the Torah without knowledge of them. This lack of knowledge, in addition to the fact that his audience did not read Arabic and therefore could not read the writings of the Geonim of Babylonia and the sages of Spanish Jewry, caused Ibn Ezra to explain many of the foundations of the medieval sciences within his commentary and in books close to the commentary. Although Ibn Ezra himself opposed the addition of these matters into the commentary, it seems that out of necessity Ibn Ezra was compelled to add also these sciences.

== His Commentaries on the Torah ==
There exist three commentaries of Ibn Ezra on the Torah: the Short Commentary (on the entire Torah), the Long Commentary (on Genesis and Exodus, sometimes called "the Other Version") and the Oral Commentary (on the portions of Vayishlach and Vayechi).

=== The Short Commentary ===
The Short Commentary was written by Ibn Ezra in Lucca in Italy around the year 1143. This is the first commentary on the Torah written by Ibn Ezra and it covers all the Five Books of the Torah. As implied by its name, most of the opening phrases in the commentary are short, but when he speaks on fundamental topics he may expand even over several pages on a single phrase.

=== The Long Commentary ===
The Long Commentary (called so because its opening phrases are longer relative to the first commentary on the Torah) Ibn Ezra began to write in the year 1153, most likely in the city of Rouen in France. The background to the writing of the commentary is a vow that Ibn Ezra vowed at the time of his illness, that if God would heal him he would write a new commentary on the Torah. The Long Commentary exists only on two of the Books, Genesis and Exodus. Between the commentaries on the two Books there are differences, but they belong to the same commentary.

==== The Commentary on Genesis ====
As mentioned, the commentary on Genesis Ibn Ezra wrote in the year 1153. At the beginning of the commentary he writes an introduction in which he explains the principles of the commentary. The structure of the commentary on Genesis is that at the beginning of each portion Ibn Ezra interprets the difficult words in the portion, and afterwards interprets the content of the portion. Of the commentary that has reached us, only the commentary up to chapter 12 verse 11 has survived.

==== The Commentary on Exodus ====
The commentary on Exodus was written by Ibn Ezra most likely in the year 1155 or 1156. The break between the writing of the commentary on Genesis and the commentary on Exodus brought several changes between the two commentaries:

1. In the commentary on Exodus, Ibn Ezra integrates the linguistic commentary within the content commentary.
2. In the commentary on Exodus, he interprets all the verses in order.
3. In the commentary on Exodus, he begins each portion with a poem dealing with the portion.

=== The Oral Commentary ===
The Oral Commentary was written by a student of Ibn Ezra, Joseph ben Jacob of Morville, based on lessons he heard from him when Ibn Ezra was in London. At present, only the commentaries on the portions of Vayishlach and Vayechi exist, but it is most likely that the commentary was on the entire Book of Genesis.

== Principles of the Commentary ==
=== The Target Audience ===
The target audience for the commentary is not clear. On the one hand, Ibn Ezra testifies that the readership to which he directs himself is wise people. Thus, in his introduction to the Book of Isaiah, Ibn Ezra declares that the secrets revealed in the commentary will astonish the "understanding of heart," and in his introduction to Lamentations, Ibn Ezra directs his interpretations to the "men of truth." However, from his commentaries emerges an adaptation of the commentary also to the broader public that is less educated. The reason for this duality, according to Friedländer, is the need to adapt the commentary to all readers, both the educated and the simple people. This duality is expressed in several ways. First, Ibn Ezra conceals parts of his words and writes them as secrets which only the educated will understand, while alongside the secret there appears a simpler interpretation intended for those who did not understand the secret. The second way is that Ibn Ezra integrates in his commentary scientific investigations understandable only to the educated, but only in places where he thinks there is no choice.

=== His Introduction to the Commentary on the Torah ===
Ibn Ezra wrote two extensive introductions to his commentary on the Torah in which he details the five approaches in relation to the commentary on the Torah, explaining each approach with a short explanation and "ranking" the approaches according to their correctness. For the purpose of explaining the truth of the approach, Ibn Ezra uses a parable from the field of mathematics – a circle with a point inside it, with the point being the true commentary and the other interpretations positioned in relation to it.

The five approaches to the commentary on the Torah are:

1. The way of several Geonim, who lengthen their interpretations and insert all human knowledge into their commentary on the Torah. Ibn Ezra objects to this way and considers it to be the circle surrounding the point. He does not object to studying things that are not included in the Torah, but claims that one must not insert into the Torah things that are not found in it in the plain sense. And in his words:
  And he who wishes to study the external wisdoms, let him learn them from the books of the men of understanding, then he will consider their proofs if they are correct.
2. The way of the Karaite commentators, who interpret Scripture without consideration for the halakhic tradition of the Sages, in what they claim is the peshat. Ibn Ezra objects to this way sharply and brings many examples that it is impossible to interpret in such a manner, since many times the Torah can be interpreted in several ways. In the parable of the point he places this way as people who thought they found the point, but in truth are very far from it.
3. The way of the Christian commentators, who interpret the Torah as allegory, and deny the plain meaning of the verses. Against this way Ibn Ezra argues that it is located outside the circle, and in this way only fools go:
  ...and I will not lengthen to reply to them, for they are of the deluded of heart, for the matters are not disputed on the side of justice.
4. In this way there is a difference between the Long Commentary and the Short Commentary. In the Short Commentary Ibn Ezra describes the way of the sages of Israel in the Christian lands, whose interpretations are nothing but a copy of the Midrash of the Sages on the verses. Ibn Ezra argues that such interpretations are unnecessary – he who wishes to study the words of the Sages can simply open the Midrashim of the Sages. Nevertheless, this way is close to the point and is the truest until now. And in his words:
  And after the Midrashim are found in the books of the ancients, why should these latter ones trouble us to write them again?

In the Long Commentary, Ibn Ezra brings in this way the Sages themselves. This way is sometimes at the point and sometimes around it, but the deviation from the point is intentional, in order to interpret the verse with necessary homiletical interpretations.

1. This way is the way of Ibn Ezra and according to him it is the point itself. According to this way, one must examine well the "grammar of every word" and interpret it according to its place in the commentary and according to the other times this word appears in the Bible, while disregarding homiletical interpretations that are not according to the plain meaning, except in matters of law, in which one must follow the "transmitters" – that is, the Sages, whose tradition is true. In his words:
  From Him alone I fear, and I will not show favoritism in the Torah, and I will search well the grammar of every word with all my might, and afterwards I will interpret it according to what my hand can reach, and every word that you seek – in the interpretation of the first word you will find it...

== Commentaries on His Commentary ==
On his commentary on the Torah many dozens of commentaries were written because of its style which is difficult to understand, its writing full of hints, and its important status. Among these commentaries can be counted:

- "Tzafnat Paneach" (Ohel Yosef) by Rabbi Joseph Tov Elem the Spaniard.
- The commentary "Mekor Chaim" by Rabbi Samuel ibn Seneh Zarza.
- The commentary "Even Ha-Ezer" by Rabbi Judah ben Shakhnin.
- The commentary "Otzar Nechmad" by Rabbi Moses Hagoleh of Kiev (the second).
- "Maamar Yom Tov", by the author of the Tosafot Yom Tov.
- "Mechokkei Yehuda" by Rabbi Yehuda Leib Krinsky, Vilna 1907–1928.
- "Be’er Yitzchak" by Rabbi Yitzchak Sheres, Livorno 1864.
- "Ezrah Le-havin" by Rabbi Yitzchak Meller, Berdichev 1897.
- A commentary by Asher Weiser in his edition of Ibn Ezra's commentary on the Torah, published by Mossad Harav Kook (also appears in the Chumash Torat Chaim by the publisher).
- "Avi Ezri" by Rabbi Shlomo HaKohen of Lissa – in this commentary there appears a claim that certain matters in Ibn Ezra's commentary were not written by him at all: "Therefore I believed the words of many and also complete ones who declared about several matters written in the book that they are not from his mouth, but strangers came and desecrated it, and mistaken students wrote in his name in order to profane his holy name... for all the intention of the scoffers is to show falsehood about a good man in order that their words be believed among the masses, for the words of the Rabbi are full of fear and of wisdom and moral teaching.".
- "Commentary on Ibn Ezra" by Rabbi Shlomo Neter.
- "Daat Ezra" by Nehemia Sheinfeld, published by Mossad Harav Kook. The commentary is comprehensive and written in a readable style and in contemporary Hebrew. On the margins of the page were brought the methods of the early authorities who agree or disagree with Ibn Ezra. Also were brought places in which his words stand in contradiction to the Midrashim of the Sages and the decided law.
- "Ahavat Kedumim" by Rabbi Eliyahu Cohen Ilovitzky. The commentary includes studies and explanations on Ibn Ezra's commentary on the Torah, as well as a book of entries and rules of exegesis of Ibn Ezra in his commentary on the Torah. Beit Shemesh, 2016
