= Jewish poetry from al-Andalus =

Hebrew poems composed in Muslim Spain

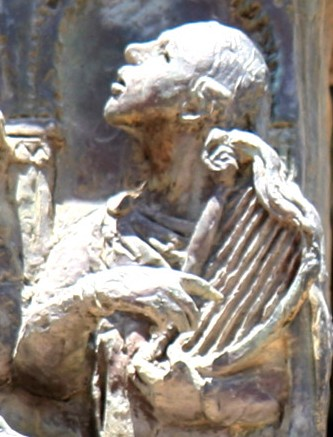
Judah Halevi, a leading Jewish poet of medieval Spain, depicted on the Knesset Menorah

The golden age of Jewish poetry in Al-Andalus developed in the literary courts of the various taifas. Like its Arabic counterpart, its production diminished in the 12th century under the rule of the Almoravids and Almohads. In the last part of the 10th century, Dunash ben Labrat revolutionized Jewish poetry in Al-Andalus by bringing Arabic meter and monorhyme into Hebrew writing. Jewish poets employed Arabic poetic themes, writing bacchic poetry, garden poetry, and love poetry.

== Literary language ==
As in the rest of the Arabic world at the time, Arabic was the typical language for Jewish writing, except for sacred religious texts and belles lettres. Practically all Jewish works about philosophy, theology, mathematics, were written in Arabic, typically in Hebrew characters. This body of writing forms part of Judeo-Arabic literature and is commonly described linguistically as Judeo-Arabic, although there was little difference in the language used by Jews and non-Jews at this time. The choice of Hebrew as the poetic language can be seen as an expression of Jewish self-assertion. Contemporary Arabic poets considered their language, the language of the Qur'an, the most beautiful language, and Arabic verse as the highest form of poetry; Jewish poets thought similarly of their sacred writings and composed poetry in Biblical Hebrew Apart from Dunash's metrical innovations, the Hebrew of these poems tried to emulate the diction and style of Classical Hebrew, abolishing elements that had been introduced into the language after the canonization of the Hebrew Bible. This classical approach was facilitated by advances in the study of Hebrew grammar and biblical interpretation.

== Hebrew liturgical poetry ==
The Tanakh contains several poetic sections, including the Song of the sea and the Song of Deborah, as well as poetic books such as the Book of Psalms and the Book of Job. The Talmud also includes a number of poetic sections. Piyyut had flourished in Byzantine Palestine between the fifth and seventh centuries. The incorporation of the complex and opaque poetry of the piyyutim required the recognition of an unusual vocabulary, foreign words, complex grammatical forms, and a great number of allusions to Jewish religious sources.

== Caliphate of Córdoba ==
In the late 10th century, Dunash ben Labrat, a North African rabbi and student of Saadia Gaon, arrived at the Caliphate of Córdoba and revolutionized Hebrew poetry in al-Ándalus. Dunash designed a system of short and long vowels for Hebrew that allowed it to imitate Arabic meter, and adopted the structure of the qasida. Practically all Judeo-Spanish poets adopted Dunash's innovations. Moses ibn Ezra said that the best Hebrew poetry was composed according to the Arabic model, but Yehudah Halevi, a contemporary of ibn Ezra, felt ambivalent toward the metric innovations, condemning them as a cultural surrender.

== Golden age of Judeo-Spanish poetry ==
Taifas in 1080. The division of the Caliphate of Córdoba into taifas produced a literary flourishing in al-Ándalus.

The division of the caliphate into taifas, and the subsequent literary courts in various taifas, brought a golden age to Judeo-Spanish poetry. Notable poets of this period include Semuel ibn Nagrella (993-1056), Salomón ibn Gabirol (1021-1055), Moses ibn Ezra (1055-1138), Yehudah Halevi (1074-1141), Yishaq ibn Gayyat (1038-1089), and Abraham ibn Ezra (1092-1167). These poets were particularly influenced by Middle Eastern Arabic poets such as al-Mutanabbi and Abu Tammam, rather than by Andalusians poets. Many shared al-Mutanabbi's elitism toward a society that wasn't interested in their poetry. Love poetry, following the Arabic tradition, was inspired by the work of Abu Nuwas. Themes included beauty and longing, unrequited love, the pleasures of wine or naseeb, as well as the love obstacles of Hejazi poetry. A number of medieval Hebrew songs glorify the beauty of boys, particularly between the 11th and early 13th centuries. As with Arabic poetry, the production of Jewish poetry diminished under the reign of the Almoravids and the Almohads from the 12th century onwards.

== Meters and genres ==
The qasida was typical for major poetic genres. The madih praised and honored a great man, while the martiyya or ritza commemorated the death of a great man. The satirical hiya or hichá ridiculed enemies, although this form is much more prominent in Arabic poetry.

Poets also adopted the Muwashshah, a strophic form typically devoted to issues related to the pleasures of life, descriptions of wine and its consumption, love or expressions of regret for the ephemeral nature of these pleasures. The Kharja, or final refrain of these muwashshahat typically switched from classical Arabic to colloquial Andalusian Arabic. In Hebrew poems, the change was between different languages—from Hebrew to Arabic or a Romance language like Judaeo-Spanish - a testament to the trilingual society Andalusian Jews lived in. As for themes, Jewish poetry, which had previously centered on the liturgical, became very similar to the Arabic tradition. By the tenth century, Arabic culture had developed a rich and varied poetic tradition. Jewish poets used the nostalgic tone of poetry of the Arabian Desert for poems about their own exile; imitated the Bacchic poems that described the pleasures of wine and sheltered gardens, and reflected on the lifestyle of a well-to-do class that shared values with their Muslim peers. They also shared an interest in Neo-Platonic concepts about the soul and other themes of Arabic love poetry, reformulated through the language of the Hebrew Bible (especially the Song of Songs), which penetrated both sacred and secular Hebrew poetry.

== Notable poets of the era ==
- Yehuda Halevi
- Solomon ibn Gabirol
- Samuel Hanagid
- Moses ibn Ezra
- Abraham ibn Ezra
- Dunash ben Labrat
- Joseph ben Tanchum
