= Shlomo HaKohen =

"Shlomo HaKohen" may refer to:

- Shlomo HaKohen (Maharshakh) (1540–1602)
- Solomon Hanau (1687–1746)
- Shlomo HaKohen of Lissa (18th century)
- Shlomo HaKohen (1750–1827)
- Shlomo HaKohen (1828–1905)
