= History of the Jews in Tudela =

The history of the Jews in Tudela, Navarre goes back well over one thousand years.

The city of Tudela in the Navarre was the oldest and most important Jewish community in the former Kingdom of Navarre.

== Organisation under Christian rule ==
When King Alfonso the Battler captured Tudela from the Muslims in 1119, the city contained a large number of Jews. In fact, several of Tudela's better-known Jews were born during the time of Muslim political control, although Benjamin of Tudela was probably born soon after the Christian conquest.

The Jews were not content with a fuero (charter) granted in 1121 by the conqueror, and suspecting that their safety was threatened, they decided to emigrate; only at the special request of Alfonso and on his promise that they should be granted municipal rights similar to those of Nájera, did the Jews consent to remain. Subsequent tensions are suggested by the fact that Sancho VI of Navarre (known as "The Wise") in 1170 confirmed all the rights which Alfonso had granted them and assigned to them the castle precincts as a Jewish quarter. The king gave them a tax exemption on condition they maintained their section of the fortifications; he permitted them freely to sell their houses located in the former Judería; and he allowed them to establish a cemetery outside the city. He also showed tolerance in his regulation of their legal status.

In the Judería there was a large synagogue (repaired in 1401) and several smaller ones. The Jewish community had its own magistrates, comprising two presidents and twenty representatives (regidoros), who drew up new statutes, inflicted penalties, excluded from membership in the community, and pronounced the ban. In 1359, the Jews of Tudela petitioned Don Luis, brother and representative of King Charles II, that they might be allowed to punish those Jews who violated their religious regulations. In a statute drawn up in March 1363 by the representatives of the community, it was decided to deal energetically with informers and slanderers. This statute was publicly read in all the synagogues on Yom Kippur (the Jewish day of atonement) and, in 1400, it was renewed for a period of forty years.

== Professions and economic activities ==
The Jews of Tudela followed various occupations. They traded in grain, wool, cloth and even, under Muslim rule, slaves. There were among them tanners, who were obliged to pay 35 sueldos a year to the king for the use of their tannery, which was situated on the river Ebro. Jewish shoemakers and gold- and silver-workers had their shops in a special market-place, for which in the year 1269 they paid 1,365 sueldos to Theobald II. They had also their own motalafla, or gagers' bureau, where their weights and measures were subjected to official inspection. They engaged in money-lending also, while some of them - Don Joseph and Don Ezmel de Ablitas, for example - had large commercial houses. The farming of the taxes likewise was in their hands. Solomon and Jacob Baco and Ezmel Falaquera were tax farmers, and Nathan Gabai was chief farmer of the taxes.

== Scholars ==
Tudela was the birthplace or residence of a number of Jewish scholars, the most famous of whom were the scholar Judah ha-Levi (c. 1075–1141) and the 12th-century traveller Benjamin of Tudela, the account of whose travels was translated into several languages, and is still a valuable historical source. Chayyim ben Samuel (author of the "Tzeror ha-Chayyim"), Shem-T'ob ben Isaac Shaprut (philosopher and apologist), and several members of the learned Minir family were born in the city. The cabalist Abraham Abulafia passed his youth in Tudela.

Other rabbis of Tudela are known: Joshua ibn Shuaib, author of sermons, kabbalist and student of Rabbi Solomon ibn Aderet who flourished in the 14th century; Joel ibn Shu'aib, author of sermons and Bible commentaries; and Chasdai ben Solomon, who flourished in the 15th century. Sources differ as to whether Rabbi Abraham Ibn Ezra was born in Tudela or Toledo - he is famous as a poet, grammarian, mathematician, and astronomer - he has a lunar crater named after him (Abenezra).

== Physicians ==
Like his grandfather, who had for his body-physicians the Jews Don Joseph and Don Moses Aben Samuel, King Sancho VI also had a Jewish physician, named Solomon, to whom he not only granted baronial rights in the whole kingdom, but also gave farm-land and vineyards in two villages near Tudela. Further, in 1193, a few months before his death, he granted Solomon also proprietary rights in the bath located in front of the Albazares gate.

== Economic decline ==
The Jews of Tudela, whose 500 families had by 1363 diminished to 270, were greatly oppressed by the taxes imposed on them by the king. These in 1346 and the following years had amounted to 2,000 livres annually, and in 1375 to 3,382 livres. In addition, the Jews had to pay subsidies from time to time. In consequence of the war with Castile and owing to the ravages of the plague in 1379 and 1380, the community continued to decrease in numbers till in 1386 there were scarcely 200 Jewish families in the city, and these were so poor that the taxes could not be collected from them.

== Persecution ==
In February 1235, Tudela was the scene of a rebellion against the government, when many Jews were wounded and several were sacrificed to the rage of the populace. Peace was restored only through a treaty between King Theobald I and the city council.

The Shepherds' Crusade of 1321 affected Tudela. About 30,000 rapacious murderers fell upon the Jews in Tudela, killing many of them. When, some time later, 500 (or, according to other accounts, 300) made another attempt to surprise the Jews, they were overcome by a knight who lay in wait for them. Out of gratitude to Providence for their escape from this danger, the wealthier Jews endeavored to alleviate the condition of their coreligionists who had suffered from the persecutions. They collected grain and oil in storehouses, and supported poor Jews therefrom for a period of three years. In the great persecution of 1328, during which 6,000 Jews perished in Navarre, those of Tudela did not escape.

In 1492, the Jews were expelled from the dominions of Ferdinand and Isabella, sovereigns of Castile and Aragon, by the Alhambra Decree. The Jewish population of Tudela was increased by the arrival of refugees from other parts of Spain. In 1494, 160 Jewish households were recorded as having paid their taxes.

In 1498, King John III of Navarre, under the influence and pressure of Ferdinand and Isabella, issued an edict to the effect that all Jews must either be baptized or leave the country. In Tudela, 180 families received baptism. The converts, or conversos, were suspected of being Marranos, or secret Jews. Many of them emigrated a few years later to France. The names of 180 conversos who, in 1510, donated to the king for protection were recorded and kept in the city archives. In 1512, the Castilian troops led by Ferdinand II of Aragon conquer Navarre, including Tudela. In 1513, the Spanish Inquisition is extended to Navarre. Later, a manta ("blanket") was painted reproducing the sambenitos of 36 persons condemned by the Inquisition, mostly as judaizers. It was exposed in the nave of Tudela's cathedral until the end of the 18th century. The records and the manta were consulted in the trials of purity of blood of the 18th century. Tudela still preserves some Hebrew documents in its archives. Also buildings associated with the Jewish community have survived to the present day.
