= Eli Tsiyon ve-Areha =

Hebrew-language Zion poem from medieval Germany

Refrain of Eli Ẓiyyon ve-Areha

Eli Tsiyon ve-Areha (Hebrew: אֱלִי צִיּוֹן וְעָרֶיהָ, romanized: Elî ẕiyyôn we-ʿarêha, lit. 'Wail, Zion and Its Cities') is an acrostic Zionide of anonymous authorship, lamenting the destruction of Jerusalem and the Temple. It closes the series of kinnot chanted on the morning of Tisha B'Av by Ashkenazi communities.

The poem appears in manuscripts as early as the fourteenth century. Structural similarities to Tsiyon ha-lo tishali suggest that it was composed by Judah Halevi or one of his imitators.

Eli Tsiyon ve-Areha is known for its distinctive melody, which likely originated in Southern Germany. It has been compared to medieval tunes for the Souterliedekens and the folk song "Die Frau zur Weissenburg". The melody has become symbolic of Tisha B'Av and the three weeks preceding it, and as such is traditionally also used during this period for the refrain to Lekha Dodi.

== Text ==
The poem comprises twelve stanzas, each divided into four rhyming lines beginning alternately with ʿalei (for) and veʿal (and for). In the text below, the first Hebrew letter of each line is made bold as to indicate the alphabetical nature of the poem. The kinna's refrain is derived from a verse in the Book of Joel: "Lament like a maiden wrapped in sack-cloth for the husband of her youth."

Hebrew

אֱלִי צִיּוֹן וְעָרֶֽיהָ, כְּמוֹ אִשָּׁה בְּצִירֶֽיהָ,
וְכִבְתוּלָה חֲגֽוּרַת־שַׂק, עַל בַּֽעַל נְעוּרֶֽיהָ.

עֲלֵי אַרְמוֹן אֲשֶׁר נֻטַּשׁ, בְּאַשְׁמַת צֹאן עֲדָרֶֽיהָ,
וְעַל בִּיאַת מְחָרְפֵי אֵל, בְּתוֹךְ מִקְדַּשׁ חֲדָרֶֽיהָ.
עֲלֵי גָלוּת מְשָֽׁרְתֵי אֵל, נְעִימֵי שִׁיר זְמָרֶֽיהָ,
וְעַל דָּמָם אֲשֶׁר שֻׁפַּךְ כְּמוֹ מֵימֵי יְאוֹרֶֽיה.

עֲלֵי הֶגְיוֹן מְחוֹלֶֽיהָ, אֲשֶׁר דָּמַם בְּעָרֶֽיהָ,
וְעַל וַֽעַד אֲשֶׁר שָׁמַם וּבִטּוּל סַנְהֶדְרֶֽיהָ.
עֲלֵי זִבְחֵי תְמִידֶֽיהָ וּפִדְיוֹנֵי בְּכוֹרֶֽיהָ,
וְעַל חִלּוּל כְּלֵי הֵיכָל וּמִזְבֵּֽחַ קְטוֹרֶֽיהָ.

עֲלֵי טַפֵּי מְלָכֶֽיהָ בְּנֵי דָוִד גְּבִירֶֽיהָ,
וְעַל יׇפְיָם אֲשֶׁר חָשַׁךְ בְּעֵת סָֽרוּ כְּתָרֶֽיהָ.
עֲלֵי כָבוֹד אֲשֶׁר גָּלָה בְּעֵת חׇרְבַּן דְּבִירֶֽיהָ,
וְעַל לוֹחֵץ אֲשֶׁר לָחַץ וְשָׂם שַׂקִּים חֲגוֹרֶֽיהָ.

עֲלֵי מַֽחַץ וְרֹב מַכּוֹת אֲשֶׁר הֻכּוּ נְזִירֶֽיהָ,
וְעַל נִפּוּץ אֱלֵי סֶֽלַע עֲוִילֶֽיהָ נְעָרֶֽיהָ.
עֲלֵי שִׂמְחַת מְשַׂנְאֶֽיהָ בְּשׇׂחְקָם עַל שְׁבָרֶֽיהָ,
וְעַל עִנּוּי בְּנֵי חוֹרִין נְדִיבֶֽיהָ טְהוֹרֶֽיהָ.

עֲלֵי פֶֽשַׁע אֲשֶׁר עָֽוְתָה סְלוֹל דֶּֽרֶךְ אֲשׁוּרֶֽיהָ,
וְעַל צִבְאוֹת קְהָלֶֽיהָ שְׁזוּפֶֽיהָ שְׁחוֹרֶֽיהָ.
עֲלֵי קוֹלוֹת מְחׇרְפֶֽיהָ בְּעֵת רַֽבּוּ פְגָרֶֽיהָ,
וְעַל רִגְשַׁת מְגַדְפֶֽיהָ בְּתוֹךְ מִשְׁכַּן חֲצֵרֶֽיהָ.

עֲלֵי שִׁמְךָ אֲשֶׁר חֻלַּל בְּפִי קָמֵי מְצֵרֶֽיהָ,
וְעַל תַּֽחַן יְצַוְּחוּ לָךְ קְשׁוֹב וּשְׁמַע אֲמָרֶֽיהָ.

Transliteration

Eli Tsiyon ve-areiha kemo isha betsireiha
vekhivtula ’hagurat-sak ʿal baʿal neʿureiha

ʿAlei armon asher nutash, beashmat tson ʿadareiha
veʿal biat me’harfei El, betokh Mikdash ’hadareiha.
ʿAlei galut meshartei El, neʿimei shir zemareiha
veʿal damam asher shupakh kemo me'imei yeoreiha

ʿAlei heggion me’holeiha, asher damam beʿareiha
veʿal vaʿad asher shamem uvitul sanhedreiha.
ʿAlei ziv’hei temideiha ufidiyonei bekhoreiha
veʿal ’hilul kelei heikhal umizba’h ketoreiha.

ʿAlei tafei melakheiha, benei David, guevireiha,
veʿal yofiam asher ’hashakh beʿet saru ketareiha.
ʿAlei khavod asher gala beʿet ’horban devireiha
veʿal lo’hets asher la’hats ve-sam sakim ’hagoreiha.

ʿAlei ma’hats verov makot asher huku nezireiha
veʿal niputs elei salaʿ ʿavileiha neʿareiha.
ʿAlei sim’hat messaneiha bessa’hkam ʿal shevareiha
veʿal ʿinuy benei ’horin nediveiha tehoreiha.

Alei feshaʿ asher ʿavta, selol darekh ashureiha
veʿal tsivʾot kehaleiha, shezufeiha she’horeiha.
ʿAlei kolot me’harfeiha beʿet rabu fegareiha
veʿal rigshat megadfeiha betokh Mishkan ’hatsareiha.

ʿAlei Shimkha asher ’hulal befi kamei metsareiha
veʿal ta’han yetsav’hu lakh keshuv ushmaʿ amareiha.

English translation

Mourn Zion and her cities, like a woman in her birth pains,
And like a maiden wrapped in sack-cloth for the husband of her youth.

Mourn the palace that was abandoned in the sheep’s negligence of its flock,
and for the coming of the revulsion of God within the Temple’s rooms.
For the exile of the servants of God, who sing her songs,
and for their blood that was spilled like the waters of her rivers.

For the chatter of her dancers which was silenced in her cities,
and for the gathering that destroyed and canceled her Sanhedrin.
For the periodic sacrifices and redemption of her firstborns,
and for the desecration of the vessels of Temple and the altar of her incense.

For the children of her kings, sons of David her hero,
and for their beauty that was darkened at the time of the removal of her crowns.
For the glory that was bared at the destruction of her holiest places,
and for the pressure that was caused and placed sack-cloths around her bodies.

For the striking and many blows by which her ascetics were struck,
and for the clubbing on the rock of her young children.
For the joy of her haters in their laughter on her breaking,
And for the affliction of her freemen and her pure princes.

For the sins that she committed, making the ways of the wealthy lewd,
And for the hosts of her congregations, her blackened and tarnished ones.
For the voices of her scorners at the time of her increasing dead bodies,
And for the noise of her cursers within the sanctuary of her courtyards.

For Your name which was desecrated in the mouths of those who stood up against her distressed ones,
and for the supplication they will cry out to you, give attention and hear her speech.

== Legacy ==
Many poems based on Eli Tsiyon ve-Areha have been composed, including an elegy on the death of Princess Charlotte by Hyman Hurwitz (translated into English by Samuel Taylor Coleridge), an elegy on the death of Theodor Herzl by Aaron Luboshitzky, a kinnah for the Holocaust by Yehuda Leib Bialer, and various polemic and comedic poems.

Various musical arrangements of the melody were also produced in the 20th century. These include a paraphrase for piano and cello by Leo Zeitlin and its adaptation for piano and violin by Joseph Achron, both members of the New Jewish School, which aimed to create a national Jewish art music.

== See also ==
- Libi BaMizrah
- Tziyyon ha-lo tishali
