= Kinnot =

Hebrew lamentations

Kinnot (Hebrew: קינות; also kinnos, kinoth, qinot, qinoth; sing., qinah or kinnah) are Hebrew dirges (sad poems) or elegies. The term is used to refer both to dirges in the Hebrew Bible and to latterly-composed poems that Jews traditionally recite on Tisha B'Av.

== In the Bible ==
In the Hebrew Bible, the term kinah or qinah refers to a dirge or lament, especially as sung by Jewish female professional mourners. The Christian Jerusalem Bible refers to Isaiah 47 as a qinah or "lament for Babylon", and to Ezekiel 19 as a qinah or lamentation over the rulers of Israel. A. W. Streane suggests that the prophecy given by Jeremiah in Jeremiah 22:6–7 concerning the 587 BCE destruction of Jerusalem is written "in Ḳinah metre".

== Tisha B'Av recitation ==
On Tisha B'Av, Jews traditionally recite a series of elegiac poems, known as kinnot, after the evening and morning prayers. These poems mourn the destruction of both the First and Second Temple in Jerusalem and other tragedies in Jewish history, including the Crusades, the Expulsion of Jews from Spain, and the Holocaust. The kinnot are generally recited on the night of Tisha B'Av after reciting the Book of Lamentations, which was called Kinnot in the Talmudic era, assuming its more familiar name, ʾĒkhāh (אֵיכָה), in the Middle Ages. Some communities recite some of the kinnot before beginning the evening service on Erev Tisha B'Av.

=== Development of the Ashkenazic kinnot ===
Many kinnot were composed by Rabbi Eleazar ben Kalir, who likely lived during the 6th and 7th centuries. His kinnot resemble the structure and content of the Book of Lamentations. For example, one of his kinnot begins each stanza with the word ʾĒkhāh, the opening word of Lamentations. He often writes stanzas in an alphabetical acrostic, similar to the first four chapters of Lamentations. The style deals primarily with the 70 CE destruction of the Second Temple, similar to Lamentations, which mourns the destruction of the First Temple.

The main impetus for the creation of new kinnot during the Middle Ages was the Crusades, during which Christian mobs decimated many Jewish communities throughout Europe and the Middle East. The kinnot deal with the then-current tragedy of the Crusades, no longer focusing on the destruction of the Temple in the past. The loss of the Torah and its scholars, instead of the loss of the Temple, occupies a central theme. Rabbi Judah Halevi wrote a kinnah of a different nature. In his poem Tziyon Halo Tishali, he expresses a longing to return to Jerusalem rather than expressing pain and despair over the tragedies of the distant or near past. Many later poets copied him. Halevi is also supposed to have written the final kinah of the morning service, Eli Tsiyon ve-Areha.

=== Sephardic kinnot ===
The various Sephardic and Mizrachi Jewish communities of North Africa and the Middle East have a rich tradition of kinnot. Below is an extensive list of compositions based on the practices of communities in Morocco and Tunisia:

==== Evening kinnot ====
1. Divrey Nevi'im (דברי נביאים)
2. Lu Yishqelu Re'ay (לו ישקלו רעי)
3. Nishmat Shedudim (נשמת שדודים)
4. Shanah BeShanah (שנה בשנה אהגה כיונה / כי עיר עדינה היתה לזונה)
5. Yonah Nikh'avah (יונה נכאבה נפשה דאבה / היכל דר ערבות יום יום סובבה)
6. Shim'u VeHa'azinu (שמעו והאזינו ואדברה אני / אומרה לאל סלעי למה שכחתני)
7. Nishmat Yeladim (נשמת ילדים שוממים על חורבן אריאל)
8. Et Oyveḥa El (את אויביך אל תשמיד ותחריב / בעגלה ובזמן קריב)
9. Yom Kemo Ned (יום כמו נד עמדו דמעי בפני / על קדושים זרע ברוכי ה׳)
10. Ad An Tzvi Muddaḥ (עד אן צבי מדח ואין מקבץ לו / נגש וגם נענח גבר מאד חילו )
11. Ashaher Adati (אשחר עדתי)
12. Eftaḥ pi Lehodot (אפתח פי להודות)
13. Aryeh Sha'ag (אריה שאג)
14. Eykh Mishkani Elyon (איך משכני עליון)
15. HaLanofelim Tequmah (הלנופלים תקומה)
16. Nishmat Emunim (נשמת אמונים)
17. Nilah lehelil (נלאה להיליל)
18. Heikhal Adonai ('היכל ה)
19. Yom Nilḥamu Bi (יום נלחמו בי)
20. Qol Aholah Tityapeaḥ (קול אהלה תתיפח)
21. Bore Ad Ana (בורא עד אנא)
  Al Naharot Bavel (על נהרות בבל) is read from the book of Psalms

Then, Arvit is prayed, with the kinnot continuing after the Amidah:

1. Lemi Evkeh (למי אבכה)
  Megillat Eykhah/Lamentations (מגילת איכה) is then read, followed by:
2. Az Baḥata'enu (אז בחטאנו חרב מקדש)
3. Zekhor Adonai Meh Hayah Lanu (זכר ה׳ מה היה לנו)
4. Beleyl Zeh Yivkayun (בליל זה יבכיון)
5. Midey Shanah Qinnah (מדי שנה קינה בליל זה מזומנה)
6. Al Zeh Hayah Daveh Libenu (על זה היה דוה לבנו ועל אלה חשכו עינינו)
7. Al Leyl Ḥorban Heykhal Miqdash (על ליל חרבן היכל מקדש / מדי ליל זה ספד יחדש / על עיר קדש ועל המקדש)
8. Oy Ki Yarad Esh Min Hashamayim Liyrushalayim (אוי כי ירד אש מן השמים לירושלים עיני עיני יורדה מים)
9. Zechor Adonai Liyhudah Ulefrayim (זכור ה' ליהודה ולאפרים)
10. Alekhem Edah Qedoshah (אליכם עדה קדושה אשאל מכם שאלות / מה נשתנה הלילה הזה מכל הלילות)
11. Oy Ki Qinat Rabbat (אוי כי קינת רבת מפי בן ומפי בת / ויהי נעם נשבת במוצאי השבת), said only at the conclusion of Shabbat
12. Ani Hagever (אני הגבר אקונן), said only at the conclusion of Shabbat
13. Az Baḥata'enu (אז בחטאנו חרב מקדש), composed by Eleazar ben Killir
  The years since the destruction of the Temple are then counted (מניין שנות החורבן)
  Some communities then recite the following kinnah:
14. Al Heykhali Ḥevli KeNahasḥ Noshe (על היכלי חבלי כנחש נושך ולשממות ציון אשב בחושך), composed by Rabbi Israel ben Moses Najara

==== Morning kinnot ====
See קינות תשעה באב (Hebrew)

=== Kinnot in memory of the Holocaust ===
Although the fast of Tisha B'Av originated to mourn the destruction of the Temple, over the years, other travails of the Jewish diaspora have been added to its observance and memorialized in kinnot. Despite this, few kinnot have been composed in the last several centuries, and none have entered the standard kinnot service.

After the Holocaust, many people felt that it was inappropriate to mourn on Tisha b'Av for the destruction of cities during the Middle Ages without mourning the even greater tragedy of the Holocaust. For this reason, many people recommended the composition and recitation of new kinnot to commemorate the Holocaust. These people, including many important rabbis, argued that in every generation, kinnot were composed to address the difficulties of that generation. Some added that it was essential to incorporate such kinnot into the Jewish liturgy, lest future generations forget the Holocaust. One popular kinnah on the Holocaust is Eli Eli Nafshi Bekhi, which was composed by Yehuda Leib Bialer.

However, many other rabbis dissented because they could not create new kinnot because the existing kinnot were holy and were composed by the greatest individuals of their respective generations, but today there is nobody who can write like them. Others claimed that any individual community could recite new kinnot as they wished, but only the greatest rabbis would have the authority to institute new kinnot for use by the entirety of world Jewry.

Rabbi Yaakov Ariel claims that the kinnot service, unlike the siddur and Jewish rituals, was not created by the authority of the rabbis, but rather developed based on the acceptance of communities and the decisions of the printers who produced printed copies. Thus, the new kinnot could gradually enter the accepted roster of kinnot. However, since many congregations now recite kinnot to commemorate the Holocaust, this may become an integral part of the service without a formal decision.

=== Kinnot in memory of October 7 ===
Kinnot have been written to mark the tragedies that befell the communities struck by the October 7 attacks and the increase in antisemitism that followed, including "Tisha b'Av Lament for October 7", published by the Orthodox Union. and "Kinah for the Events of Swords of Iron", written by Rabbi Yosef Zvi Rimon. Another example is "A Lament for Be'eri", written by Yagel Harush, which has been translated into English and whose first stanza begins (echoing the Hebrew word Eicha -- "How" -- that starts the Book of Lamentations):

How did Be’eri / turn into my tomb
The day of my light / to the day of my gloom
Its songs silenced/ trampled fruit and leaf
My eyes well with tears / from the depth of my grief

== See also ==
- Zionides
- City Lament
