= Yakkar ben Samuel ha-Levi =

German scholar and poet (died 1271)

Yakkar ben Samuel ha-Levi II (Hebrew: יקר בן שמואל הלוי; died 1271) was a German Jewish scholar and liturgical poet, who flourished in Cologne and in Mainz in the second half of the 13th century. He was related to Meïr of Rothenburg, in whose responsa he is several times mentioned, and was a pupil of Rabbi Jehiel of Paris. Yakkar and his father, Samuel ben Abraham, died in the massacre of 1271.

== Work ==
His marginal glosses to Avot are still preserved in manuscript. He was, besides, the author of a number of liturgical poems, including:

- A yotzer for a Sabbath festival.
- An ofan.
- A zulat, poem to be sung before the recital of the Shemoneh 'Esreh.
- A kedushah, to be sung at the repetition of the Shemoneh 'Esreh.
- A zulat, poem beginning with the words ezkerah Elohim and meant for the Sabbath following the 20th of Tammuz, in memory of the massacres of the Jewish community of Pforzheim, 1267.
- A kedushah, poem in eleven lines, with continuous rime.
- A ge'ullah of three cantos, each consisting of two stanzas of five lines.
- An elegy on Zion, in which the author's name is twice mentioned.
