= Krinsky =

Krinsky is a surname that may refer to:

- Carol Herselle Krinsky, art and architectural historian
- Chaim Yehuda Krinsky (born 1933), Chabad Lubavitch rabbi
- Dave Krinsky (born 1963), American writer and producer
- Jason Krinsky (born 1992), Criminal Defense Attorney
- Julian Krinsky, American, former South African, professional tennis player
- Leah Krinsky, American comedy writer.
- Paul L. Krinsky, Superintendent of the United States Merchant Marine Academy
- Scott Krinsky, an actor.
- Vladimir Krinsky, a Russian architect
- Vikki Krinsky, actor
- Yehuda Krinsky (born 1933), American rabbi
- Yehuda Leib Krinsky, a nineteenth-century rabbi
- Casey Krinsky, DC Comics character
