= Levi ibn al-Tabban =

12th-century Jewish grammarian and poet

Levi ben Jacob ibn al-Tabban (Hebrew: לוי בן יעקב אבן אלתבאן), also known with the Arabic surname Abu l'Fihm, was a Jewish grammarian and poet who lived at Zaragoza in the beginning of the twelfth century.

He was the friend and elder contemporary of Judah Halevi, who styled al-Tabban "King of Song." He is also alluded to by Abraham ibn Ezra in the preface to "Moznayim."

== Works ==
He was the author of a grammatical work in Arabic, called "Miftaḥ" (The Key), of which only the title has been preserved.

Of his liturgic poems a number are extant in the festival liturgies of Tripoli, Avignon, and Algeria, and can usually be easily identified by his customary acrostic, לוי בן יעקב or אני לוי. The spirit of melancholy which pervades his penitential poem in the Tripoli prayer-book (page 63a), "To you, men, I call" (Hebrew: אליכם אישים אקרא), as well as the dirge-like recital of abuse and misery which it contains, shows the poem to have been produced in an age of persecution and tyranny practiced against the Jews. Others of his literary products, which are marked by distress and gloom, also point to such circumstances. The allusions in them are to the devastation of the province of Zaragoza carried on by the Christians under Alfonso VI, whose triumphant advance Yusuf ibn Tashfin was called from Africa to check.
