= Samuel di Castelnuovo =

Samuel di Castelnuovo, who lived at the end of the sixteenth century and the beginning of the seventeenth, was secretary of the Jewish community of Rome.

He edited and probably translated into Italian:

- Judah ha-Levi's piyyut, Mi kamoka, Venice, 1609, recited on the Sabbath preceding the Feast of Purim.
- Moses Rieti's liturgic work, Ma'on ha-Shoalim, Venice, 1609. The name Castelnuovo occurs also in a halakic decision of Isaac Samuel Reggio on the ritual bath, inserted in Mashbit Milchamot, fol. 92.

== Bibliography ==
- Steinschneider, Moritz, Catalogus Librorum Hebræorum in Bibliotheca Bodleiana cols. 1988, 2410
- —, in Monatsschrift, xliii. 92, 311
- Mortara, Marco, Mazkeret Chakme Italiya: Indice Alfabetico dei Rabbini e Scrittori Israeliti di Cose Giudaiche in Italia, Padua, 1887
- Berliner, Abraham, Geschichte der Juden in Rom, von der Aeltesten Zeit bis zur Gegenwart (2050 Jahre), 3 vols., 1893
