= Joseph ben Eliezer Bonfils =

Sephardic Jewish writer (14th century)

Joseph ben Eliezer Bonfils was a 14th-century Sephardic Jewish author most notable as a supercommentary on the biblical commentary of Abraham ibn Ezra entitled Tzafnat Paneach. With greater clarity than ever before, Bonfils was responsible for elucidating Ibn Ezra's heterodox approach in a way that scholars had not uncovered.
