= Judah ben Joseph ibn Ezra =

Grenadian court noble

Judah ben Joseph ibn Ezra (in Hebrew, Yehuda ben Yosef ibn Ezra) was a Jew of Granada, Spain who lived in the twelfth century and rose to favour under Alfonso VII of León and Castile, eventually becoming the king's court chamberlain. Judah, a relative of renowned Granadian poet and philosopher Moses ibn Ezra, was made commander of the fortress at Calatrava by Alfonso after its conquest in 1147.

He enjoyed such a close relationship with the Spanish monarch that the latter, at his request, not only allowed the Jews who had fled from the persecutions of the Almohades into Toledo, but even gave many of the fugitives dwellings in Carrion, Fromista, Flascala, Palencia and several other places, where new Jewish communities were soon established. Judah ben Joseph used his influence over Alonso to further the cause of persecuted Spanish Jews until the king's death in August 1157.

With the permission of Alfonso, Judah also vigorously combated Karaism, which was gaining ground in Castile, and wrote in refutation of its arguments.

== Sources ==
- www.toledosefarad.org

== Bibliography ==
- Abraham ibn Daud, Sefer ha-Qabbalah, in Neubauer, M. J. C. pp. 80 et seq.;
- Heinrich Grätz, Gesch. vii. 187 et seq.
