= Isaac ibn Ezra =

Jewish scholar, poet, and philosopher

Isaac ben Abraham ibn Ezra (Hebrew יצחק אבן עזרא, Arabic Abu Sa'd Isḥaḳ ibn Ibrahim ibn al-Majid ibn Ezra) was a 12th century poet from Al-Andalus.

== Biography ==
The son of Sephardic Rabbi Abraham ibn Ezra, he was known as a poet early on in his life. Yehuda al-Harizi said of him in his work Tachemoni: "like his father, Isaac also drew from the springs of poetry; and some of his father's brilliancy flashes in the songs of the son".

It is believed that ben Abraham ibn Ezra left Spain around 1140 with his father. One account suggests that he traveled with his father-in-law, Jewish philosopher Yehuda Halevi, in a boat en route to Alexandria. However, while Yehuda Halevi would settle in the Land of Israel, ben Abraham ibn Ezra would continue to Baghdad. While in Baghdad, he was the protégé of Abu'l-Barakāt al-Baghdādī (Nathanael), writing poems extolling the man and his commentary on Ecclesiastes. When al-Baghdadi converted to Islam, Isaac ibn Ezra followed his example. Al-Harizi describes the conversion in Tachemoni, saying, "But when he came into Eastern lands the glory of God no longer shone over him; he threw away the costly garments of Judaism, and put on strange ones". His father lamented the conversion in two elegies, one of which was written three years after his son's conversion.

== Works ==
Ben Abraham ibn Ezra's poem for his teacher Hibat Allah and his commentary on Ecclesiastes have been preserved and edited.
