= Lekha Dodi =

Jewish liturgical song welcoming Shabbat

Lekha Dodi (Hebrew: לכה דודי) (Note: Also transliterated Lekhah Dodi, Lecha Dodi, L'chah Dodi, Lekah Dodi, Lechah Dodi.) is a Hebrew-language Jewish liturgical song recited Friday at dusk, usually at sundown, in synagogue to welcome the Sabbath prior to the evening services. It is part of Kabbalat Shabbat.

The refrain of Lekha Dodi means "Let us go, my beloved, to greet the bride/the Sabbath presence, let us welcome" and is a request of Israel's "beloved" (God) to join together in welcoming a "bride" (the sabbath). The phrase "Let us go, my beloved" is taken from Song of Songs 7:11, which Abba ben Joseph bar Ḥama ('Rava') interpreted as the people of Israel talking to God in Tractate Eruvin 21b.

During the singing of the last verse, the entire congregation rises and turns to the west, or to the door; some have the custom to exit the sanctuary of the synagogue. Traditional congregations face Jerusalem for the rest of the services. The congregation bows at "Come, O bride!" and turns back toward the front of the synagogue; some bow only forward, and others to the sides and then forward.

It was composed in the 16th century by Solomon Alkabetz, who was born in the Ottoman city of Thessaloniki, and later became a leading Kabbalist of Safed. As was common at the time, the song is also an acrostic, with the first letter of the first eight stanzas spelling the author's name. The author draws from the rabbinic interpretation of the Song of Songs, suggested as linguistically originating in the 3rd century BCE, in which the maiden is seen as a metaphor for the ancient Jewish population residing within Land of Israel, and the lover is a metaphor for God, and from the Nevi'im, which uses the same metaphor. The poem shows the people of Israel asking God to bring upon that great Shabbat of Messianic deliverance. It is one of the latest Hebrew poems regularly accepted into the traditional liturgy.

== Melody ==
Already in the early 20th century, Abraham Zevi Idelsohn recorded hundreds of different tunes used for Lekha Dodi.

Among some Sephardic congregations, the hymn is sometimes chanted to an ancient Moorish melody, which is known to be much older than the text of Lekha Dodi. This is clear not only from internal evidence, but also from the rubric in old siddurim directing the hymn "to be sung to the melody of Shuvi Nafshi li-Menukhayekhi, a composition of Judah Halevi, who died nearly five centuries before Alkabetz. In this rendering, carried to Israel by Spanish refugees before the days of Alkabetz, the hymn is chanted congregationally, the refrain being employed as an introduction only.

In some very old-style Ashkenazic synagogues the verses are ordinarily chanted at elaborate length by the hazzan, and the refrain is used as a congregational response, but in most Ashkenazic Orthodox synagogues it is sung by everyone together to any of a large number of tunes. This includes the Orthodox Synagogues who employ this element and Synagogues under the Modern-Orthodox umbrella.

=== Old German and Polish melodies ===
At certain periods of the year, many northern congregations discard later compositions in favor of two simple older melodies singularly reminiscent of the folk-song of northern Europe in the century succeeding that in which the verses were written. The better known of these is an air, reserved for the Omer weeks between Passover and Shavuot, which has been variously described, because of certain of its phrases, as an adaptation of the famous political song "Lillibullero" and of the cavatina in the beginning of Mozart's "Nozze di Figaro." But resemblances to German folk-song of the end of the seventeenth century may be found generally throughout the melody.

Less widely utilized in the present day is the special air traditional for the "Three Weeks" preceding Tisha b'Av, although this is characterized by much tender charm absent from the melody of Eli Tziyyon, which more often takes its place. But it was once very generally sung in the northern congregations of Europe; and a variant was chosen by Benedetto Marcello for his rendition of Psalm 19 in his "Estro Poetico-Armonico" or "Parafrasi Sopra li Salmi" (Venice, 1724), where it is quoted as an air of the German Jews. Cantor Eduard Birnbaum discovered the source of this melody in a Polish folk-song, "Wezm ja Kontusz, Wezm", given in Oskar Kolberg's "Piesni Ludu Polskiego" (Warsaw, 1857). An old melody, of similarly obvious folk-song origin, was favored in the London Jewry a century ago, and was sung in two slightly divergent forms in the old city synagogues. Both of these forms are given by Isaac Nathan in his setting of Byron's "Hebrew Melodies" (London, 1815), where they constitute the air selected for "She Walks in Beauty", the first verses in the series. The melody has since fallen out of use in English congregations and elsewhere.

== Text ==
The full version of the song (note that many Reform congregations omit verses 3, 4, 6, 7 and 8 which make reference to messianic redemption, while Sephardic congregations based in the Jerusalem and Aleppo rites omit verse 4 and verses 6 through 8, as they make reference to agony):

| # | English translation | Transliteration | Hebrew |
|---|---|---|---|
Chorus:
| 1 | Let’s go, my beloved, to meet the bride, | lekha dodi liqrat kalla | לְכָה דוֹדִי לִקְרַאת כַּלָּה |
| 2 | Let us welcome the presence of Shabbat. | pene Shabbat neqabbela | פְּנֵי שַׁבָּת נְקַבְּלָה |
Verse 1:
| 3 | "Safeguard" and "Remember" in a single utterance, (Note: The Ten Commandments appear twice in the Torah, in Exodus 20:8 they read "Remember (zakhor) the Sabbath Day" and in Deuteronomy 5:12 "Safeguard (shamor) the Sabbath Day". According to a midrash, both words were supernaturally spoken by God simultaneously. Here, "Safeguard" appears before "Remember" to accommodate the acrostic of the composer's name.) | Shamor vezakhor bedibbur eḥad | שָׁמוֹר וְזָכוֹר בְּדִבּוּר אֶחָד |
| 4 | We were made to hear by the unified God, | hishmiʿanu el hameyuḥad | הִשְׁמִיעָנוּ אֵל הַמְיֻחָד |
| 5 | God is one and God’s Name is one, | Adonai eḥad ushemo eḥad | יְיָ אֶחָד וּשְׁמוֹ אֶחָד |
| 6 | In fame and splendor and praiseful song. | leshem uletifʼeret velithila | לְשֵׁם וּלְתִפְאֶרֶת וְלִתְהִלָּה |
Verse 2:
| 7 | To greet Shabbat let’s go, let's be gone, | Liqrat shabbat lekhu venelekha | לִקְרַאת שַׁבָּת לְכוּ וְנֵלְכָה |
| 8 | For she is the wellspring of blessing, | ki hi meqor habberakha | כִּי הִיא מְקוֹר הַבְּרָכָה |
| 9 | From the start, from ancient times she was chosen, | merosh miqqedem nesukha | מֵרֹאשׁ מִקֶּדֶם נְסוּכָה |
| 10 | Last made, but first planned. (Note: The Sabbath Day, the seventh and last day of Creation, was essentially the last thing created in that week; yet traditionally it was part of God's plan from the very first.) | sof maʿaseh bemaḥashava teḥilla | סוֹף מַעֲשֶׂה בְּמַחֲשָׁבָה תְּחִלָּה |
Verse 3:
| 11 | Sanctuary of the king, royal city, | Miqdash melekh ʿir melukha | מִקְדַּשׁ מֶלֶךְ עִיר מְלוּכָה |
| 12 | Arise! Leave from the midst of the turmoil; | qumi tzeʼi mitokh hahafekha | קוּמִי צְאִי מִתּוֹךְ הַהֲפֵכָה |
| 13 | Long enough have you sat in the valley of tears | rav lakh shevet beʿemeq habbakha | רַב לָךְ שֶׁבֶת בְּעֵמֶק הַבָּכָא |
| 14 | And He will take great pity upon you compassionately. | vehu yaḥamol ʿalayikh ḥemla | וְהוּא יַחֲמוֹל עָלַיִךְ חֶמְלָה |
Verse 4:
| 15 | Shake yourself free, rise from the dust, | Hitnaʿari meʿafar qumi | הִתְנַעֲרִי מֵעָפָר קוּמִי |
| 16 | Dress in your garments of splendor, my people, | livshi bigde tifʼartekh ʿammi | לִבְשִׁי בִּגְדֵי תִפְאַרְתֵּךְ עַמִּי |
| 17 | By the hand of Jesse’s son of Bethlehem, | ʿal yad ben Yishay bet hallaḥmi | עַל יַד בֶּן יִשַׁי בֵּית הַלַּחְמִי |
| 18 | Draw near to my soul; redeem it. | qorvah el nafshi geʼalah | קָרְבָה אֶל נַפְשִׁי גְּאָלָהּ |
Verse 5:
| 19 | Rouse yourselves! Rouse yourselves! | Hitʿoreri hitʿoreri | הִתְעוֹרְרִי הִתְעוֹרְרִי |
| 20 | Your light is coming, rise up and shine. | ki va orekh qumi ori | כִּי בָא אוֹרֵךְ קוּמִי אוֹרִי |
| 21 | Awaken! Awaken! Utter a song, | ʿuri ʿuri shir dabberi | עוּרִי עוּרִי שִׁיר דַּבֵּרִי |
| 22 | The glory of the Lord is revealed upon you. | kevod Adonai ʿalayikh nigla | כְּבוֹד יְיָ עָלַיִךְ נִגְלָה |
Verse 6:
| 23 | Do not be embarrassed! Do not be ashamed! | Lo tevoshi velo tikkalmi | לֹא תֵבֹשִׁי וְלֹא תִכָּלְמִי |
| 24 | Why be downcast? Why groan? | ma tishtoḥaḥi uma tehemi | מַה תִּשְׁתּוֹחֲחִי וּמַה תֶּהֱמִי |
| 25 | All my afflicted people will find refuge within you | bakh yeḥesu ʿaniyye ʿammi | בָּךְ יֶחֱסוּ עֲנִיֵּי עַמִּי |
| 26 | And the city shall be rebuilt on her hill. | venivneta ʿir ʿal tillah | וְנִבְנְתָה עִיר עַל תִּלָּהּ |
Verse 7:
| 27 | Your despoilers will become spoil, | Vehayu limshissa shosayikh | וְהָיוּ לִמְשִׁסָּה שֹׁאסָיִךְ |
| 28 | Far away shall be any who would devour you, | veraḥaqu kol mevalʿayikh | וְרָחֲקוּ כָּל מְבַלְּעָיִךְ |
| 29 | Your God will rejoice concerning you, | yasis ʿalayikh Elohayikh | יָשִׂישׂ עָלַיִךְ אֱלֹהָיִךְ |
| 30 | As a groom rejoices over a bride. | kimsos ḥatan ʿal kalla | כִּמְשׂוֹשׂ חָתָן עַל כַּלָּה |
Verse 8:
| 31 | To your right and your left you will burst forth, | Yamin usmol tifrotzi | יָמִין וּשְׂמֹאל תִּפְרֹצִי |
| 32 | And the Lord will you revere | veʼet Adonai taʿaritzi | וְאֶת יְיָ תַּעֲרִיצִי |
| 33 | By the hand of a child of Peretz, (Note: A poetic description of the Messiah, who will be descended from Peretz, an ancestor of King David) | ʿal yad ish ben Partzi | עַל יַד אִישׁ בֶּן פַּרְצִי |
| 34 | We will rejoice and sing happily. | venismeḥa venagila | וְנִשְׂמְחָה וְנָגִילָה |
Verse 9:
| 35 | Come in peace, crown of her husband, | Boʼi veshalom ʿaṭeret baʿlah | בֹּאִי בְשָׁלוֹם עֲטֶרֶת בַּעְלָהּ |
| 36 | Both in happiness and in jubilation | gam besimḥa uvetzohola | גַּם בְּשִׂמְחָה וּבְצָהֳלָה |
| 37 | Amidst the faithful of the treasured nation | tokh emune ʿam segulla | תּוֹךְ אֱמוּנֵי עַם סְגֻלָּה |
| 38 | Come O Bride! Come O Bride! | boʼi khalla boʼi khalla | בּוֹאִי כַלָּה בּוֹאִי כַלָּה |

In the Sephardic rite and Chasidic tradition the last section is replaced with:

| # | English translation | Transliteration | Hebrew |
|---|---|---|---|
Verse 9:
| 35 | Come in peace, crown of her husband, | Boʼi veshalom ʿaṭeret baʿlah | בֹּאִי בְשָׁלוֹם עֲטֶרֶת בַּעְלָהּ |
| 36 | Both in song and in jubilation | gam berinah uvtzohola | גַּם בְּרִנָּה וּבְצָהֳלָה |
| 37 | Amidst the faithful of the treasured nation | tokh emune ʿam segulla | תּוֹךְ אֱמוּנֵי עַם סְגֻלָּה |
| 38 | Come O Bride! Shabbat Queen! | Boʼi khalla Shabbat malketa | בּוֹאִי כַלָּה שַׁבָּת מַלְכְּתָא |

== See also ==
- List of Jewish prayers and blessings
