= Zionides =

Jewish poetry expressing yearning for the Land of Israel

Zionides (Hebrew: צִיוֹנִים, Tsiyyonim) are piyyutim that express the longing of the Jewish nation to see the hill of Zion and the city of Jerusalem shine again in all their former glory. They date back to immediately after the 587 BCE destruction of Solomon's Temple. Since that period, Israel's poets, composers, and singers have recollected the imagined beauty of the Temple music. By far the greatest number of their works voice a desire to see the Jewish people, the city of Jerusalem, Mount Zion, and the Temple restored to their former grandeur.

== Biblical songs ==
The earliest known expression of Zion songs in Jewish literature dates to approximately the fifth century BCE, encapsulated in the poignant lament of Psalm 137:1–3, which reflects the profound grief of the Israelites as they endure exile in a foreign land. In parallel, Psalm 86 emerges from this same historical context, capturing a sense of hope and anticipation for the end of captivity, heralding the eventual return of exiles who will then compose a new song celebrating Zion. Additionally, the fifth chapter of the Book of Lamentations is an elegiac piece that culminates in a yearning for divine redemption and restoration.

== Middle Ages ==
During the Middle Ages, Zionides from the pens of the greatest poets formed the chief comfort and consolation of the people. As early as the time of Ibn Gabirol (11th century) songs of Zion were incorporated in the liturgy, partly as lamentations for Tisha B'Av and partly as tefillot and piyyutim. Notable lamentations for Zion which are sung on Tisha B'Av include: a song beginning with the words בליל זה יבכיון ויילילו בני and giving a vivid description of the destruction of Zion; the well-known song which begins with the words עוני שמרון קול תתן מצאוני, and in which Samaria and Jerusalem try to excel each other in the description of the misfortune which has fallen upon them; and, above all, the Eli Tzion with its refrain:

Zion and her cities wail like a woman in childbirth, and like a virgin clothed in sackcloth for the man of her youthful choice.

Also notable are several strophes of the song Lekhah Dodi, which is sung in the Sabbath eve service.

The most important of Ibn Gabirol's Zionides are the poem beginning with the words:

Send a prince to the condemned people which is scattered hither and thither

and that beginning:

Turn thy face, O God, to the conquered, who is delivered up into the hand of Babel and of Seir.

Judah ha-Levi (1140) was the author of the Zionide beginning. Among his most prominent Zion poems is Tziyyon ha-lo tishali (Hebrew: צִיּוֹן הֲלֹוא תִשְׁאֲלִי):

Zion, wilt thou not send a greeting to thy captives, Who greet thee as the remnant of thy flocks? From West to East, from North to South, a greeting, From far and near, take thou on all sides. A greeting sends the captive of desire, who sheds his tears Like dew on Hermon; would they might fall on thy hills.

Besides this song, which has been translated into nearly all European languages in prose and in verse, Judah wrote several shorter songs, chief of which are Libi baMizrah (Hebrew: לִבִּי בְמִזְרָח; "My heart is in the East, although I am at the end of the West") and

Sigh, O Jerusalem; and shed thy tears, O Zion.

== Various authors ==
Among other medieval writers of this class may be mentioned Abraham ibn Ezra, who composed the Zionide ("O God, who art enthroned in the East, appease the mourning dove"); Judah al-Ḥarizi (13th century), author of the song ("Peace be to the city of Salem Jerusalem"); and Israel Najara (16th century), who wrote the song ("May the flower of salvation bloom like a palm").

In more modern times Samuel David Luzzatto wrote:

("My heart, my heart is full of pain; see, my grief is an ancient one");

Equally well known is Joseph Almanzi's

("From all corners comes rejoicing on the day of celebration to God, who is good").

The most prominent Hebrew poets have written Zionides, among the number being M. S. Rabener, Micah Levisohn, Judah Loeb Gordon, S. Mandelkern, M. M. Dolitzky, and N. H. Imber. Countless songs have been produced under the influence of Zionism: of these may be mentioned the song adopted by all the Zionists of the world as their national song, and beginning with the words "There, where a slender cedar kisses the clouds"; the song of the academic society Kadimah in Austria, "Knowest thou whence freedom comes"?; the song of the united Zionists, "Sluchajcie bracia gueśni tij"; and "Hatikva" (Hope), composed by N. H. Imber, which has the refrain:

("Our hope has not yet gone, the old hope to return to the land of our fathers, to the city where David lived").

== See also ==
- Zion and Jerusalem in Jewish prayer and ritual
- Jerusalem in Judaism
- Piyyut
- Hatikvah

== Bibliography ==
- Kinnor Tziyyon, Warsaw, 1900 (collection of all the Zionides from the oldest times to the present day [Hebr.])
- Yevreiskyie Motivy, Grodno, 1900
- Heinrich Loewe, Liederbuch für Jüdische Vereine, Cologne, 1898
- Jacobs, Jewish Ideals, p. 131
