= Shlomo HaKohen of Lissa =

Lithuanian rabbi (18th century)

Shlomo HaKohen ben Eliezer of Lissa (18th century) was a rabbi and biblical commentator. He wrote the supercommentary Avi Ezer on the commentary of Abraham ibn Ezra on the Pentateuch. Titled in Hebrew Beor Dikdukkei Ha-Rava, first printed in Posen 1802, later reprinted in Mikraot Gedolot, Vilna, 1874, and next reprinted in the Mikraot Gedolot, Lemberg, 1881. It is now included in some versions of the Mikraot Gedolot.
