= Yehuda Leib Krinsky =

Yehuda Leib Krinsky (Judah Leib Krinsky) (Hebrew: יהודה ליב קרינסקי) was a Belarusian-Jewish theologian, businessman, philanthropist and Hebrew scholar of the late 19th and early 20th centuries.

== Life ==
Krinsky was born into an Eastern European rabbinical family. He was born in Minsk, but the year of his birth is unknown. His father, Rabbi Isaac (Yitzchok) Krinsky, died in the autumn of 1853. In his youth, he studied both Torah and secular studies (what B. Z. Eisenstadt calls חכמה, "wisdom"). He later moved to Slutzk, where he went into the timber business and made a fortune. He became a philanthropist, supporting rabbis and Torah scholars. Later, he moved to Minsk, where he began his major work of scholarship, the Meḥōqeqē Yehudā.

== Works ==
Only one work by Krinsky is known, though more might show up in the future. This one work is the five-volume Meḥōqeqē Yehudā or Mechokekei Yehudah (“Michochay Yehuda”) (Hebrew: מחוקקי יהודה), a super-commentary on Abraham ibn Ezra's commentary on the Pentateuch and certain of the Megilloth. The title, meaning The Lawgivers of Judah, is a reference to Krinsky's first name. Krinsky worked on the Genesis volume from at least 1903 until 1907, when it was published. It is one of the most popular supercommentaries on Ibn Ezra. The volume on Exodus was published in 1910. He continued to work on the remaining three volumes, but they were not published until 1928, by which time Krinsky was probably no longer alive.

The published Meḥōqeqē Yehudā includes the Hebrew text of the Pentateuch, the Aramaic text of Targum Onqelos, and the commentaries of Rashi and Ibn Ezra. Beneath these sources appear Krinsky's annotations. Krinsky's notes on Ibn Ezra are divided into two columns. The first column is entitled Yahēl Ōr ("may light shine", an allusion to Krinsky's given name, Yehuda Leib), and it consists of straightforward explanations of Ibn Ezra's words. The second column is entitled Qarnē Ōr ("beams of light", also a pun on Krinsky's name, based on its value in gematria); it consists of short essays relating to Ibn Ezra's work. These essays often include quotes from one or more of the following three sources: (1) classical rabbinic literature; (2) other writings by Ibn Ezra himself; and (3) reactions to Ibn Ezra by other medieval Jewish writers. When the other writers criticize Ibn Ezra, Krinsky tries to defend him. One of the most valuable aspects of the Qarnē Ōr is the extensive quoting from Ibn Ezra's other works. The commentary of Ibn Ezra on the Torah is a very concise and cryptic work; often, paragraphs that Ibn Ezra has written in other works shed invaluable light on understanding these cryptic interpretations. One of Krinsky's contributions to the study of Ibn Ezra was to explain the meaning of many of the arcane allusions in his commentary.

The first volume is preceded by a short history of Ibn Ezra's life and a bibliography of his works.

Attached to the Meḥōqeqē Yehudā is a work, Minḥath Yehudā, a very brief super-commentary on Rashi's commentary on the Pentateuch, which notes the ancient Rabbinic sources for Rashi's comments, and clarifies the correct reading of Rashi's text.

== Association with the Haskala (Jewish Enlightenment) ==
Krinsky's annotations in Meḥōqeqē Yehudā make frequent reference to thinkers of the Haskala, such as Heinrich Graetz, S. D. Luzzatto, and especially Moses Mendelssohn. This raises the question of how strong Krinsky's own associations with the Haskala were. The study of Ibn Ezra's writings was not particularly common among non-haskalic, Haredi Jews of nineteenth-century Eastern Europe, for Ibn Ezra's commentary focuses on Hebrew grammar, and, to a lesser extent, the sciences. Thus, it would be reasonable to suspect that Krinsky adhered to some form of the Haskala.

The haskama (letter of approbation) of Rabbi Eliezer Rabbinowitz, prefixed to the Genesis volume of Meḥōqeqē Yehudā, refers to Krinsky as "God-fearing", an epithet that makes it clear that Krinsky was observant of Jewish law. This would place him firmly in the religious branch of the Haskala, rather than its secular branch. This is clear also from other evidence, such as Krinsky's choice to publish Meḥōqeqē Yehudā in the form of a traditional Pentateuch for liturgical use in the synagogue. The haskamoth that Krinsky managed to obtain for his volume on Exodus were indeed written by key figures of the religious Haskala, including Abraham Berliner, A. E. Harkavy, and S. A. Poznanski, among others.

There are also haskamoth from major Haredi leaders such as R' Isser Zalman Meltzer, who praises Krinsky for his attention to "Dikduk HaLashon" (grammar), implying that the Haredi world was quite comfortable with his work. (Note: Haskamah to Genesis - Note: the 1989 Reinman edition contains only the Haredi Haskamos.)

== Criticism of Krinsky by others ==
The work Meḥōqeqē Yehudā was not received well. The traditional world seems to have ignored it altogether, whereas the critical world has given it a number of bad reviews. Already in 1907, the year when Krinsky published the first volume, David Hertzog published a harsh review of it in ZDMG. Much later, in 1990, Arye (Leo) Prijs called Krinsky's work misleadingly incomplete.

Despite the flaws for which Krinsky's work has been criticized, Meḥōqeqē Yehudā remains one of the few modern complete supercommentaries on Ibn Ezra's Pentateuch commentary. Most other modern supercommentaries on Ibn Ezra's Pentateuch commentary have either been minimal in nature (such as Asher Weiser's annotations to the Mosad Ha-Rav Kook edition of Ibn Ezra's commentary) or covered only a few chapters of Ibn Ezra's commentary (such as the works by Prijs and Linetsky, each of which covers only the first few chapters of Genesis). Scheinfield, however, has published a new version with Mossad Harav Kook, "Da'at Ezra", containing a comprehensive commentary on all five volumes of the Torah commentary.

Meḥōqeqē Yehudā was used extensively by Rabbi Chaim Brovender in his teaching, and it remains popular among his students.
