= Judah Halevi =

Iberian philosopher and poet (c.1075–1141)

Abu al-Hasan Judah ben Samuel ha-Levi
- יהודה בן שמואל הלוי
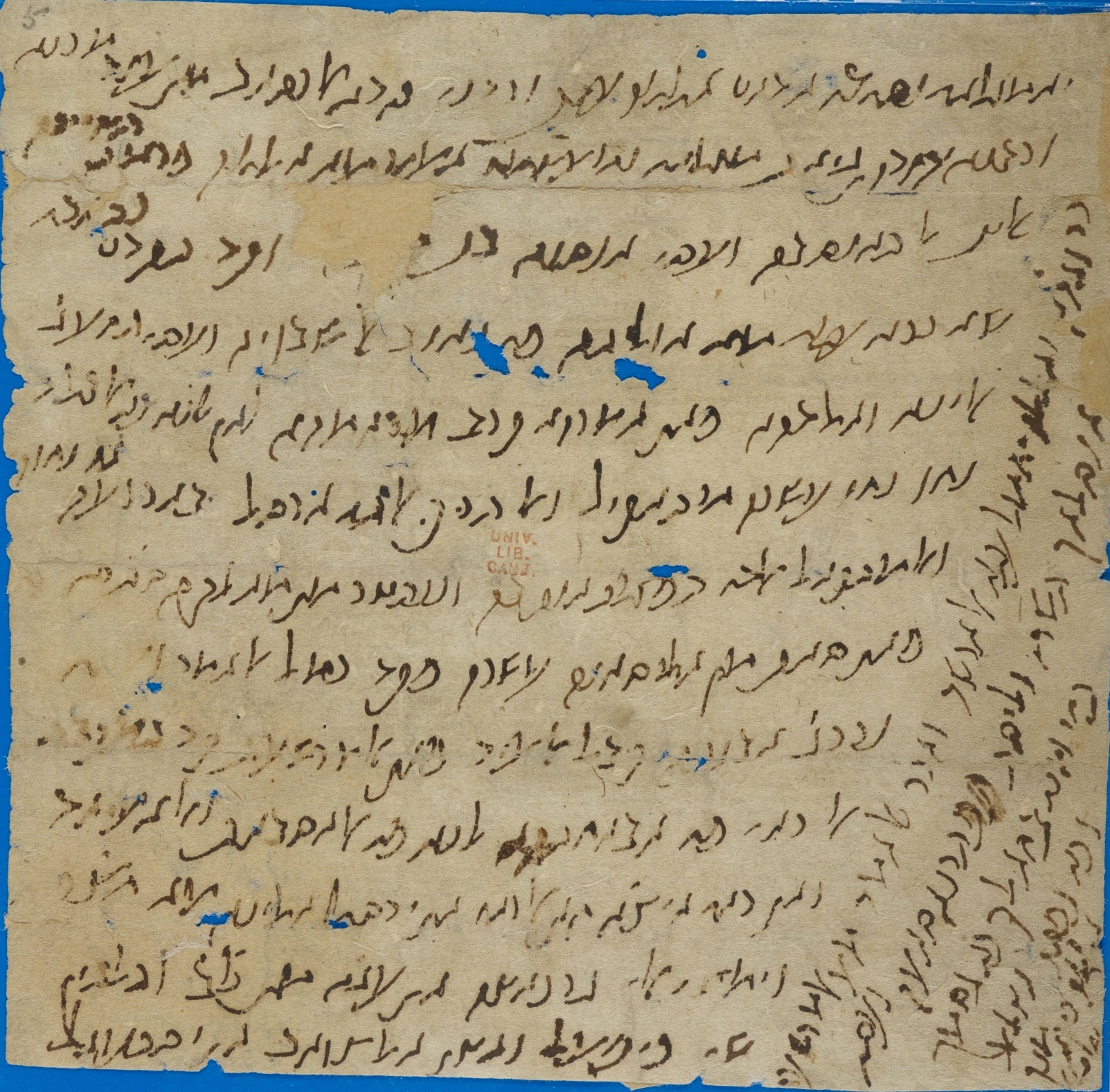
- One of four known surviving personal letters of Judah haLevi, all of which are written in Arabic with Hebrew script and addressed to Ḥalfon ben Nethaniel ha-Levi of Fustat.
- Born: c. 1075; Toledo or Tudela, Al-Andalus
- Died: 1141 (66 years) possibly in Jerusalem, Kingdom of Jerusalem
- Era: Golden age of Jewish culture in Spain
- Known for: Hebrew poetry; Jewish philosophy
- Notable work: Kuzari; Libi BaMizrah; Tziyyon ha-lo tishali

Judah haLevi (also Yehuda Halevi or ha-Levi; Hebrew: יהודה בן שמואל הלוי, romanized: Yəhūḏā ben Šəmūʾēl ha-Lēvī; Arabic: أبو الحسن يهوذا اللاوي, romanized: Abū-l-Ḥasan Yahūḏā al-Lāwī; c. 1075–1141) was a Sephardic Jewish poet, physician and philosopher. HaLevi is considered one of the greatest Hebrew-language poets and is celebrated for his secular and religious poems, many of which appear in present-day Jewish liturgy.

Judah haLevi was born in either Tudela or Toledo in Al-Andalus, then under Almoravid rule. Although little is known about his early life or education, it is clear that he was well-versed in Arabic, Hebrew, and classical sciences, including medicine and philosophy. In his youth, he began composing Hebrew poetry, and his reputation eventually reached Moses ibn Ezra in Granada. After initial difficulties in traveling due to political shifts, haLevi was able to establish literary connections across major Jewish centers in al-Andalus.

HaLevi's poetic corpus includes a wide array of genres, including panegyrics, friendship poems, wine songs, riddles, didactic verse, and wedding poems. However, he is best remembered for his Zionides (צִיוֹנִים, Tsiyyonim, '[songs of] Zion')—piyyutim that powerfully express longing for the Land of Israel. Among the most enduring is Tziyyon ha-lo tishali (צִיּוֹן הֲלֹוא תִשְׁאֲלִי, 'Zion, do you not inquire'), which became part of synagogue liturgy and was imitated widely. Another famous poem, Libi b'Mizraḥ (לִבִּי בְּמִזְרָח, 'My heart is in [the] East'), articulates his internal conflict between the comforts of Spain and his spiritual connection to Zion, contrasting the "West" (Spain) with the "East" (the Land of Israel). In addition to poetry, haLevi wrote a philosophical treatise commonly known as the Kuzari, which presents a polemical defense of Judaism. The speaker affirms the truth of revealed religion and argues for the spiritual centrality of the Jewish people and their unique connection to the Land of Israel.

Late in life, Judah haLevi resolved to leave Spain and settle in the Holy Land. He reached Egypt in 1140, where he was warmly received and remained in Alexandria for a year at the request of admirers. In 1141, he sailed for the Land of Israel, then the Crusader Kingdom of Jerusalem. He likely died shortly after, possibly at sea or near the gates of Jerusalem.

== Biography ==
Judah ben Samuel haLevi was born either in Toledo, Spain, or Tudela, Navarre, both then ruled by the Almoravid dynasty, between 1075 and 1080. The confusion surrounding his place of birth arises from unclear text in a manuscript. Both cities were under Muslim control when he grew up but were conquered by Christian rulers during his lifetime; Toledo by Alfonso VI of León and Castile in 1085, and Tudela by Alfonso the Battler in 1118.

HaLevi likely received a comprehensive education in Jewish texts (including both the Hebrew Bible and Talmud), the Arabic language, and the sciences, including as medicine, mathematics, and philosophy. As a youth, he traveled to Granada, the main center of Jewish literary and intellectual life at the time. There, he modeled work after Moses Ibn Ezra for a competition, sparking recognition for haLevi's aptitude as a poet as well as a close friendship with Abraham ibn Ezra.

As an adult, he was a physician and an active participant in trade and Jewish communal affairs. He was in contact with both Jewish and non-Jewish nobles and dignitaries within Spain and around the world. While in Toledo, he supported himself by practicing medicine. He and ibn Ezra were well acquainted, and the latter quoted haLevi on multiple occasions in his commentary on the Tanakh.

Like other Jewish poets during the golden age of Jewish culture in Spain of the 10th to 12th centuries, he employed patterns and themes of Arabic poetry in his work. His themes embrace all those that were current among Hebrew poets: praise of friends and notable figures, reflections on fate, youth and ageing, expressions of friendship and love, wine and celebration, didactic verse, wedding compositions, poetic riddles, and poems centred on longing for the Land of Israel. His poetry is distinguished by special attention to acoustic effect and wit. Ha-Levi had at least one daughter, reportedly a poet herself, who married Isaac ibn Ezra, son of Abraham ibn Ezra.

=== Journey to the Holy Land ===
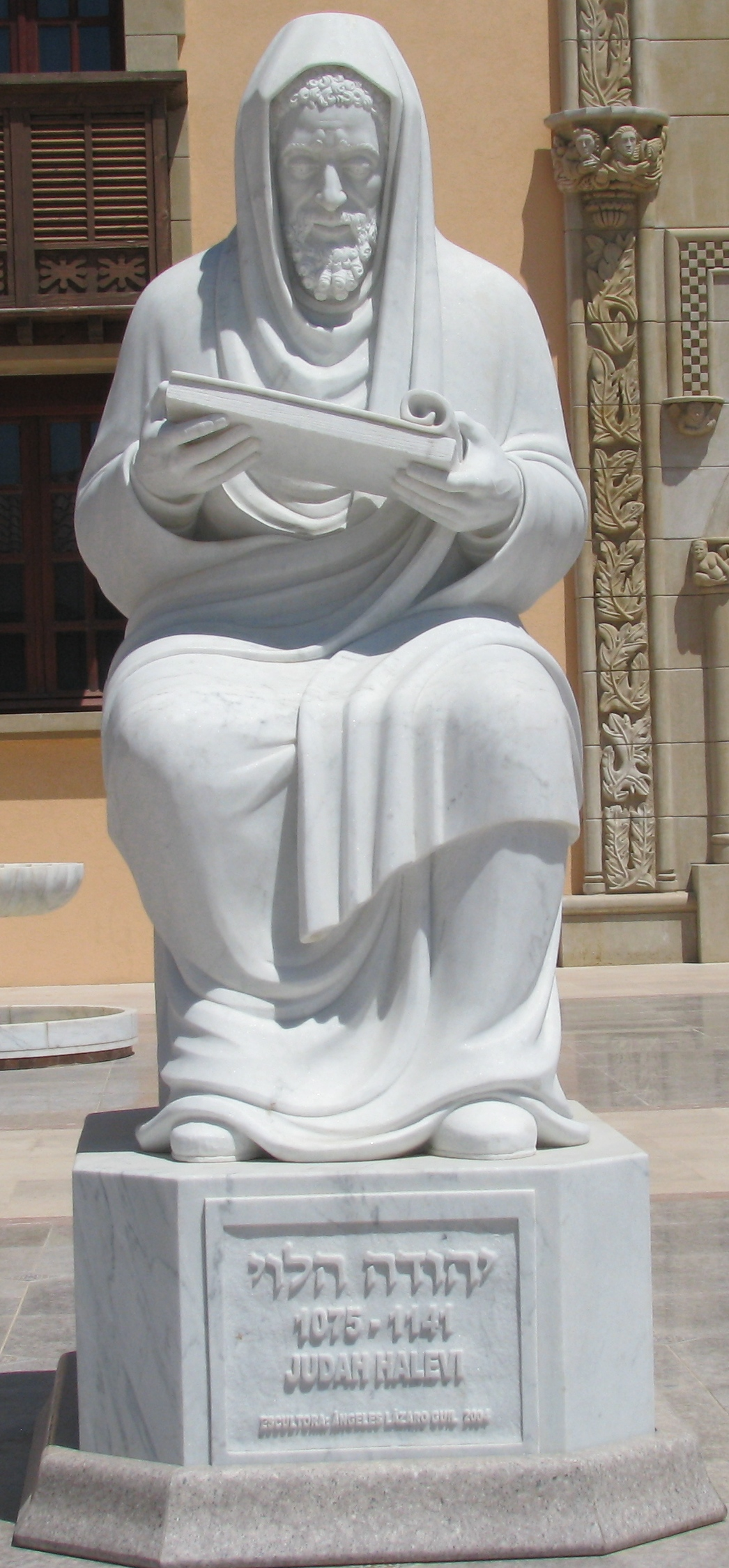
A statue of Judah Halevi in Caesarea, Israel.

Although he occupied an honored position as a physician, intellectual, and communal leader in al-Andalus, haLevi was stirred to journey to the Land of Israel to spend his final days there. In his philosophical treatise the Kuzari, he argues that the presence of the God of Israel is most palpable in the Land of Israel, and it is therefore ideal and most religiously fulfilling for Jews to live there. He ends the dialogue with the rabbi character deciding to leave for Jerusalem, as haLevi himself would.

HaLevi planned to make his own aliyah. His passion for Israel eventually overpowered his hesitation and concerns about leaving his friends, family, and status to live under Crusader rule. The uncertainties of Jewish communal status and favor within the government during the period of the Reconquista may have caused him to consider the future security of Jews in the diaspora.

HaLevi's journey is seen either as a personal religious pilgrimage or as a call for the diaspora to reject its blending of Graeco-Arabic-Iberian cultures, with the former representing diasporist views and the latter reflecting Zionist perspectives.

On September 8, 1140, haLevi arrived in Alexandria, where he was greeted enthusiastically by friends and admirers. He then went to Cairo, where he visited several dignitaries and friends. Returning to Alexandria in the spring, haLevi was reportedly denounced and sued by an apostate who claimed haLevi sought to force him to return to Judaism by withholding money belonging to him. He was reportedly acquitted through his connections and legal subterfuge.

HaLevi's ship set sail from Egypt on May 14, 1141; a letter from Abu Nasr ben Avraham to Halfon ben Netanel dated November 12, 1141, suggests haLevi died in July or August. It is uncertain if he arrived safely in Jerusalem or if his departure was delayed and he died in Egypt, but it can may be reasonably assumed that he was able to reach Palestine in this time.

Legend also has it that haLevi was trampled by an Arab horseman as he arrived in Jerusalem, with the first account found within a Hebrew miscellany published around 450 years after haLevi's presumed death. According to a sixteenth-century legend, he died as a martyr while reciting his composition "Ode to Zion" in front of the gates of Jerusalem. An 1141 letter to a prominent rabbi in Damascus also potentially refers to haLevi's death at the gates of Jerusalem. As only fragments are preserved of this letter, it is unclear whether the writer is discussing haLevi or another Jew. Raymond P. Scheindlin notes that "the legend of his martyrdom, combined with the prominence of the Land of Israel in his life and works, invested his image with a mystique that had an important afterlife in Zionist literature."

Documents that survive from haLevi's last years include panegyrics to his various hosts in Egypt and explorations of his religious motivations for his aliyah, preserved in the Cairo geniza. Some contain imaginary details of the voyage, such as descriptions of a turbulent sea that express trepidation for the journey but hope for the spiritual light that might follow. Poems and letters bearing on haLevi's journey are translated and explicated in The Song of Distant Love by Scheindlin.

=== Burial ===
Tradition places the tombs of Judah haLevi and Abraham ibn Ezra in Cabul, a village in the Galilee.

== Poetry ==
HaLevi's work covers common subjects in Spanish-Jewish poetry and draws on the forms and artistic patterns of both secular and religious poetry. Some formats include the zajal, the muwaššaḥ, and poems utilizing internal rhyme, classical monorhyme patterns, and the then-recently invented strophic form. About 800 of his poems are known today. Independent haLevi scholar Jose de la Fuente Salvat elevated him to the "most important poet in Judaism of all time". HaLevi composed muwaššaḥāt in Hebrew with kharjas containing Andalusi Arabic and Romance.

=== Diwan ===
Shortly after his death, his poetry was collected into a dīwān, apparently in Egypt and based on smaller collections of his poetry already in circulation. His diwan was edited and published by Henrik Bródy in four volumes from 1895 to 1904. Bródy's edition divides haLevi's work into seven genres.

- Poems about friendship and laudatory poems (שירי ידידות ושירי הכבוד, shirei yedidut v'shirei hakavod): 138 poems
- Pieces of correspondence in rhymed prose (מכתבים, mikhtavim): 7 pieces
- Love poems (שירי אהבה, shirei ahavah): 66 poems
- Elegies (קול בוכים, kol bokhim) and lamentations and eulogies (קינות והספדים, kinot v'hespedim): 43 pieces
- "Elevation" of the soul to Zion (מסע נפש ציונה, massah nefesh tsiyyonah) and traveling poems (שירי ציון ושירי מסע, shirei tsiyyon v'shirei massah): 23 poems
- Riddle poems (חידות, ḥiddot): 49 poems
- On the remnant of Judah (Hebrew: שארית יהוּדה, romanized: sh'eirit Yehudah) and other songs (שירים שונים, shirim shonim): 120 poems

=== Secular poetry ===
HaLevi's secular poetry comprises poems of friendship, love, humor, and eulogy. Drinking songs by haLevi have also been preserved, as well as verses relating to his vocational work as a physician. HaLevi's "prayer for the physician" was first translated into English in 1924:

My God, heal me and I shall be healed.
Let not Thine anger be kindled against me so that I be consumed.
My medicines are from you, whether good
Or evil, whether strong or weak.
It is Thou who shalt choose, not I.
Of Thy knowledge is the evil and the fair.
Not upon my power of healing I rely.
Only for Thine healing do I watch.

==== Friendship ====
Even in his youth, a large number of renowned literary scholars gathered around him, including Levi ibn al-Tabban of Zaragoza; the aged poet Judah ben Abbas; Judah ibn Ghayyat of Granada; Moses ibn Ezra, Judah ben Joseph ibn Ezra, Joseph ibn Ezra, and Isaac ibn Ezra; Meïr ibn Kamnial; the physician and poet Solomon ben Mu'allam of Seville; his schoolmates Joseph ibn Migash and Baruch Albalia, son of Isaac Albalia; and the grammarian Abraham ibn Ezra.

In Córdoba, Spain, haLevi addressed a touching farewell poem to Joseph ibn Tzaddik, the philosopher and poet. In Egypt, celebrated men vied to entertain him; his reception was a veritable triumph. Here, his particular friends included Aaron He-Haver ben Yeshuah Alamani of Alexandria, the nagid Samuel ben Hananiah of Cairo, Halfon Ha-Levi of Damietta, and an unknown man in Tyre. HaLevi sympathetically shared their sorrow and joy, as shown in a short poem: "My heart belongs to you, ye noble souls, who draw me to you with bonds of love".

==== Elegy ====
Especially tender and plaintive is haLevi's tone in his elegies. He often utilized the qasida form and meditated on death and fate. Many of them are dedicated to friends such as the brothers Judah (Nos. 19, 20), Isaac (No. 21), and Moses ibn Ezra (No. 16), R. Baruch (Nos. 23, 28), Meïr ibn Migas (No. 27), Isaac Alfasi, head of the yeshiva in Lucena, Cordoba (No. 14), and others. In the case of Solomon ibn Farissol, who was murdered on May 3, 1108, Judah suddenly changed his poem of eulogy (Nos. 11, 22) into one of lamentation (Nos. 12, 13, 93 et seq.).

Child mortality due to plague was high in Judah's time, and the historical record contains five elegies that mourn the death of a child. Biographer Hillel Halkin hypothesizes that at least one of these honors was given to one of Judah's children who did not reach adulthood and is lost to history.

==== Love ====
Joyous, careless youth, and merry, happy delight in life find their expression in his love-songs, many of which are epithalamia. In Egypt, where the muse of his youth found a glorious "Indian summer" in the circle of his friends, he wrote his "swan-song": "Wondrous is this land to see, With perfume its meadows laden, But more fair than all to me Is yon slender, gentle maiden. Ah, Time's swift flight I fain would stay, Forgetting that my locks are gray."

Many of his poems are addressed to a gazelle or deer according to the custom in al-Andalus, and his oeuvre includes homoerotic poems such as "That Day While I Had Him" and "To Ibn Al-Mu'allim." They follow established themes in Arabic and Hebrew poetry, such as the lover's yearning contrasted with the cruelty of the beloved, who possesses a shining countenance. It is unknown whether this work reflects personal experience or artistic tradition.

==== Riddles ====
Judah is noted as the most prolific composer of Hebrew riddles, with a corpus of at least sixty-seven riddles, some of which survive in his own hand, and even in draft form, though only a few have been translated into English. Judah's riddles are mostly short, monorhyme compositions on concrete subjects such as everyday objects, animals and plants, or names or words. One example is the following: "What is it that's blind with an eye in its head, but the race of mankind its use can not spare; spends all its life in clothing the dead, but always itself is naked and bare?"

=== Religious poetry ===
==== Shirei Zion (Songs of Zion) ====
Halevi's attachment to the Jewish people is a significant theme in his religious poetry. He identifies his sufferings and hopes with those of the broader group. Like the authors of the Psalms, he sinks his own identity in the wider one of the people of Israel, so that it is not always easy to distinguish the personality of the speaker.

Though his impassioned call to his contemporaries to return to Zion might have been received with indifference, or even with mockery, his own decision to go to Jerusalem never wavered. "Can we hope for any other refuge either in the East or in the West where we may dwell in safety?" he exclaims to one of his opponents. His Zionides gave voice both to the Jewish people as a whole and to each Jew, and he never lost faith in the eventual deliverance and redemption of Israel and his people:

"Lo! Sun and moon, these minister for aye; The laws of day and night cease nevermore: Given for signs to Jacob's seed that they Shall ever be a nation — till these be o'er. If with His left hand He should thrust away, Lo! with His right hand He shall draw them nigh."

One of his Zionides, Tziyyon ha-lo tishali (Hebrew: צִיּוֹן הֲלֹוא תִשְׁאֲלִי, lit. 'Zion, do you not inquire'), laments the destruction of the temple and puts forth the dream of redemption. It is also one of the most famous kinnot Jews recite on Tisha B'Av:

Zion, wilt thou not ask if peace's wing / Shadows the captives that ensue thy peace / Left lonely from thine ancient shepherding? Lo! west and east and north and south — world-wide / All those from far and near, without surcease / Salute thee: Peace and Peace from every side.

Halevi's poems of longing for Israel, like Libi baMizrach (no: לִבִּי בְמִזְרָח, lit. 'My heart is in the east') juxtapose love and pain, and dream and reality to express the distance between Spain and the Middle East and his desire to bridge it. He believed he would find true liberation through subservience to God's will in Israel.

Judah was recognized by his contemporaries and in succeeding generations as "the great Jewish national poet." Some of his poetry and writing have also been considered an early expression of support for Jewish nationalism.

==== Shirei Galut (Songs of the Diaspora) ====
Judah combined descriptions from Scripture with personal and historical Jewish experiences to create a distinct form of religiously themed poetry. He used devices such as sound patterns and vivid imagery to evoke the suffering of exile and the fear of the destruction of his people due to a delayed redemption.

==== Lyrical poetry ====
Halevi was a prolific author of piyyutim, selichot and kinnot. They were carried to all lands, even as far as India, and they influenced the rituals of the most distant countries. Even the Karaites incorporated some of them into their prayer-book, so that there is scarcely a synagogue in which Judah's songs are not sung in the course of the service. Zunz makes the following observation on Judah's synagogal poems:

"As the perfume and beauty of a rose are within it, and do not come from without, so with Judah word and Bible passage, meter and rime, are one with the soul of the poem; as in true works of art, and always in nature, one is never disturbed by anything external, arbitrary, or extraneous."

His piyyut Mi Khamokha (Hebrew: מִֽי־כָמֹ֤כָה, romanized: mi-ḵāmoḵā), was translated by Samuel di Castelnuovo and published in Venice in 1609.

Much of his work that expresses his personal relationship with God later became liturgical poetry.

Judah also wrote several Shabbat hymns. One ends with the words:

"On Friday doth my cup o'erflow / What blissful rest the night shall know / When, in thine arms, my toil and woe / Are all forgot, Sabbath my love!

'Tis dusk, with sudden light, distilled / From one sweet face, the world is filled; / The tumult of my heart is stilled / For thou art come, Sabbath my love!

Bring fruits and wine and sing a gladsome lay, / Cry, 'Come in peace, O restful Seventh day!'

Judah used complicated Arabic meters in his poems. However, his pupil Solomon Parḥon, who wrote at Salerno in 1160, relates that Judah repented having used the new metrical methods, and had declared he would not again employ them. A later critic, applying a Talmudic witticism to Judah, has said: "It is hard for the dough when the baker himself calls it bad."

== Philosophy ==
Halevi studied philosophy as a youth. He admired it but criticized it, in a way comparable to al-Ghazali. In the Kuzari, he confronts Aristotelian philosophy, Christianity and Islam and expounds his views upon the teachings of Judaism, speaking in favor of accessing God through tradition and devotion rather than philosophical speculation. The work was originally written in Arabic, and entitled Kitab al-Ḥujjah wal-Dalil fi Nuṣr al-Din al-Dhalil, كتاب الحجة و الدليل في نصرة الدين الذليل,. Judah ibn Tibbon translated it into Hebrew in the mid-12th century with the title Sefer Hokhahah ve ha Re'ayah le Hagganat haDat haBezuyah or Sefer ha-Kuzari).

The Kuzari is structured as a fictional dialogue between the king of the Khazars and representatives of various faiths: a philosopher, a Christian, a Muslim, and a (Jewish) rabbi, each presenting arguments in favour of their respective traditions. The king, seeking the true religion, evaluates these views and ultimately embraces Judaism as the most authentic expression of divine truth. A central theme in the work is that God, the people of Israel, and the Land of Israel are inseparably bound, a conviction that inspired the author himself to journey to Jerusalem.

== Editions, translations and commentaries ==
- Heinrich Brody, Dîwân des Abû-l-Hasan Jehudah ha-Levi/Diwan wĕ-hu 'sefer kolel šire 'abir ha-mešorerim Yĕhudah ben Šĕmu'el ha-Levi. 4 vols (Berlin: Itzkowski, 1894-1930): vol. 1, vol. 2 part 2 (notes), pp. 157-330, vol. 3, pp. 1-144, vol. 3, pp. 145-308, vol. 4. According to a 2002 assessment, this is 'a flawed edition marred by numerous textual mistakes and by the erroneous inclusion of poems by other poets. It was also far from including ha-Levi's complete oeuvre'. However, 'even today, nearly a century after Brody's effort, there is still no authorized edition of Judah ha-Levi's work. The absence of such an edition has been, and will continue to be, an obstacle toward the completion of any credible study of ha-Levi's poetry.'
- Selected Poems of Judah Halevi, ed. by Heinrich Brody and Harry Elson, trans. by Nina Salaman (Philadelphia: The Jewish Publication Society of America, 1974), ISBN 0-8276-0058-5 [first publ. 1924].
- Poemas sagrados y profanos de Yehuda Halevi, trans. by Maximo Jose Kahn and Juan Gil-Albert (Mexico, [Ediciones mensaje] 1943).
- Yehuda Ha-Leví: Poemas, trans. by Ángel Sáenz-Badillos and Judit Targarona Borrás (Madrid: Clasicos Alfaguara, 1994)
- Las 'Sĕlīḥot la-'ašmurot' de R. Yehudah ha-Leví: traducción y estudio literario, ed. and trans. by M.ª
- Isabel Pérez Alonso, Colección vítor, 415 (Salamanca: Ediciones Universidad de Salamanca, 2017), ISBN 978-84-9012-763-6
- Luzzatto, דיואן ר' יהודה הלוי. Lyck, 1864.
- Rosenzweig, Franz. Jehuda Halevi, zweiundneunzig Hymnen und Gedichte Deutsch. Berlin, [publication date thought to be 1926]
- Bernstein, S. Shirei Yehudah Halevi. 1944
- Zmora, ר' יהודה הלוי. 1964
- Schirmann, שירים חדשים מן הגניזה, 1965

Literary journals and periodicals that have published his work include:

- Geiger, Abraham. Melo Hofnayim, 1840.
- Edelman, S. H. Ginzei Oxford, 1850.
- Dukes, J. L. Ozar Nehmad, 1857.
- Luzzatto, S. D. Tal Orot (1881) and Iggeret Shadal (1881, 1882-4)

Some anthologies of Hebrew poetry that feature his work include:

- Albrecht, H. Brody-K, Sha'ar ha-Shir (1905)
- Wiener, H. Brody-M, Mivhar ha-Shirah ha-Ivrit (1922, 1946 ed. Habermann, A. M.)
- Schirmann, H. Ha-Shirah ha-Ivrit be-Sefarad u-ve-Provence, vol. 1, 1959.

In 1422, Provencal Jewish scholar Jacob ben Chayyim Comprat Vidal Farissol published a commentary on the Kuzari called the "Beit Ya'akob."

== See also ==
- Jewish poetry from al-Andalus
- Maimonides
- Moses ibn Ezra
- Samuel ibn Naghrillah
- Solomon ibn Gabirol

== Bibliography ==
- Roth, Norman, ed. (2003). "Judah ha-Levy". Medieval Jewish Civilization: An Encyclopedia. Routledge Revivals. Routledge. pp. 380–384. ISBN 9781315165394.
