= Moses ibn Ezra =

11th/12th-century Andalusian Jewish philosopher, linguist and poet

Rabbi Moses ben Jacob ibn Ezra
- Born: c. 1055 – 1060; Granada
- Died: after 1138
- Other name: Ha-Sallaḥ

Philosophical work
- School: Jewish philosophy

Moses ben Jacob ibn Ezra, known as Ha-Sallaḥ ("writer of penitential prayers") (Arabic: أَبُو هَارُون مُوسَى بِن يَعْقُوب اِبْن عَزْرَا, romanized: Abū Harūn Mūsà bin Yaʿqub ibn ʿAzra, Hebrew: מֹשֶׁה בֵּן יַעֲקֹב הַסַּלָּח אִבְּן עֶזְרָא, romanized: Mōšē bēn Yaʿăqōḇ hasSallāḥ ʾībən ʿEzrāʾ) was an Andalusi Jewish rabbi, philosopher, linguist, and poet. He was born in Granada about 1055–1060, and died after 1138. Ibn Ezra is considered to have had great influence in the Arabic literary world. He is considered one of Spain's greatest poets and was considered ahead of his time in his theories on the nature of poetry. One of the more revolutionary aspects of Ibn Ezra's poetry that has been debated is his definition of poetry as metaphor and how his poetry illuminates Aristotle's early ideas. The importance of ibn Ezra's philosophical works was minor compared to his poetry. They address his concept of the relationship between God and man.

== Biography ==
Moses was born in Granada, al-Andalus (currently in Andalusia, Spain), and received both a Hebrew education and a comprehensive education in Arabic literature. While living in Lucena, the "city of poetry", Ibn Ezra was a student of Isaac ibn Ghiyyat. He held a crucial administrative office in his home province, evidenced by his Arabic title of sahib al-shurta. He also developed a strong friendship with the poet Judah Halevi, and was an important influence in Halevi's early poetic works.

Ibn Ezra belonged to one of the most prominent families of Granada. According to Isaac Israeli's Yesod Olam, he had three brothers: Isaac, Joseph, and Zerahiah, each of whom were distinguished scholars. His elder brother, Isaac Abū Ibrāhīm, was married to one of the Nagid's daughters. He appears to have been unrelated to the contemporary scholar Abraham ibn Ezra.

The capture of Granada by the Almoravids resulted in the destruction of ibn Ezra's Jewish community as well as the breakup of his family. The Ibn Ezra family fortune was confiscated; and his three brothers had to flee. Moses was married and had many children, but later on he also fled because of some threat to his life, leaving his family behind and spending the rest of his life in the Christian north. In his new city in Castile, Ibn Ezra considered himself an exile and did not think he could return to his home city. During this time it is rumored that Ibn Ezra had disagreements with his family, specifically with one of his brothers, Yosef, as well as with his own children. These disagreements contributed to his never returning home.

Based in hints in Ibn Ezra's poems, S. D. Luzzatto speculated that he might have permanently left home due to a failed courtship with his niece. However, it appears more likely that he had more prosaic reasons, such as perhaps saving his niece from the Almoravides.

== Writings ==
Ibn Ezra was a distinguished philosopher, an able linguist, and a powerful poet.

=== Literature ===
==== Metaphor ====
Moses Ibn Ezra and Maimonides had different opinions as to what represented a metaphor. Both philosophers had a huge impact on the use of metaphors in literary texts. In the Kitab, Ibn Ezra attempted to use both Arabic and Hebrew forms of metaphor with passages taken from both the Qur'an and Bible. Ibn Ezra was quite critical of earlier authors who used metaphor only to exaggerate or substituted metaphor for precise literal language. Ibn Ezra's definition of metaphor revolves around the meaning of "isti-ara" (borrowing), which is a word meaning something not known using something already known. This is Ibn Ezra's way of explaining the concept of God and God's existence. Maimonides similarly defines metaphor as temporarily “borrowing.” Maimonides’ source for his definition of metaphor is from al-Farabi's Short Treatise on Aristotle's De Interpretatione. This model defines metaphor as "saying X and really meaning Y"; hence, the claim "X is a metaphor" entails proving that it refers to Y and not to X. One of his criticisms of Ibn Ezra was that Ibn Ezra simply cited his forty biblical examples without elucidation, even though many of them are not readily referenced. The fact that these two philosophers differed so greatly is not much of a surprise since their agendas also differed. Ibn Ezra was predominantly interested in the poetic aspect of metaphor whereas Maimonides had a pure philosophical intent in his definition.

==== Rhetoric ====
Ibn Ezra's most successful work was the "Kitab al-Muḥaḍarah wal-Mudhakarah", a treatise on rhetoric and poetry written about the "Adab" writings of the Arabs. It is the only work of its kind in Hebrew literature. It was written at the request of a friend who had addressed to him eight questions on Hebrew poetry, and is divided into a corresponding number of chapters. In the first four chapters Ibn Ezra writes generally of prose and prose-writers, of poetry and poets, and of the natural poetic gift of the Arabs, which he attributes to the climate of Arabia. He concludes the fourth chapter with the statement that, with very rare exceptions, the poetical parts of the Bible have neither meter nor rhyme.

The fifth chapter begins with the history of the settlement of the Jews in Spain, which, according to the author, began during the Babylonian captivity, the word "Sepharad" in Obadiah 1:20 meaning "Spain." Then comes a description of the literary activity of the Spanish Jews, giving the most important authors and their works. In the sixth chapter the author quotes various maxims and describes the general intellectual condition of his time. He deplores the indifference shown by the public to scholars. This indifference, he declares, does not affect him personally; for he can not count himself among those who have been ill-treated by fate; he has experienced both good and bad fortune. Moreover, he possesses a virtue which permits him to renounce any pretension to public recognition—the virtue of contentment and moderation.

In the seventh chapter, Ibn Ezra discusses the question of whether it is possible to compose poetry in dreams, as some writers claim to have done. The eighth chapter deals with 23 traditional Arabic figures of speech, illustrated with examples from the Koran, Arabic poetry, and Hebrew Andalusian poetry.

Ibn Ezra's use of biblical as well as Arabic ideas has been noted. Many of his poetic phrases use Arabic ornamentation and style. Ibn Ezra uses Arabic examples to illustrate the badi, twenty rhetorical techniques found in the Kitab al-Muhadara. The presence of the badi in Ibn Ezra's work reflects a tension among Arabic, Greek, and biblical authority. In the early parts of the Kitab, Ibn Ezra cites Aristotle's eight techniques through which poetry is refined. In this part of the work, Ibn Ezra gives more credit to the Greek and Hebrew influences on literary techniques and refrains from praising Arabic style. However, Ibn Ezra later turns to Arabic poets to discuss the isti-ara, the excellence of metaphor. Here he praises the literary techniques employed by early Arabic poets. Ibn Ezra also turns to the Hebrew Bible and praises the use of metaphor in early biblical writing. In essence, Ibn Ezra's style is a result of different sources and influences which helped him develop his own poetic definitions.

=== Poetry ===
Ibn Ezra is considered by many Jews as a masterly Hebrew poet. He specifically focused on the theory of poetry and is considered to be one of the greatest experts on the subject. His secular poems are contained in two works: in the Tarshish, and in the first part of his diwan.

The "Tarshish" is divided into ten chapters, each of which contains in order the twenty-two letters of the alphabet. It is written in the Arabic style of poetry termed "tajnis," which consists in the repetition of words in every stanza, but with a different meaning in each repetition. The first chapter is dedicated to a certain Abraham (certainly not Abraham ibn Ezra), whose merits he exalts in Oriental fashion. In the nine remaining chapters he discusses wine, love, and song (chapter ii).; the beauty of country life (iii.); love-sickness and the separation of lovers (iv, v.); unfaithful friends (vi); old age (vii); vicissitudes of fortune and death (viii); confidence in God (ix); and the glory of poetry (x).

Another one of Ibn Ezra's most famous works is the "Maḳāla bi 'l-Ḥadīḳa fī maʿnāal-mad̲j̲āz wa 'l-ḥaḳīḳa." The main intent of this work is to explain to Hebrew poets how they should compose their poems, based on the structure of Arabic poems. Ibn Ezra's "Hadika" also primarily addresses the metaphorical interpretation of God and how God is such a powerful and divine being that God can not be interpreted through the human mind but simply through the use of metaphor. This was considered to be one of the most important ideas in Jewish ideology in medieval times.

The 11th and 12th centuries were an important time for Judaeo-Arabic poetry and literature. Jewish-Arabic speaking poets such as Samaw'al ibn 'Adiya (He was a Yemeni Arab who migrated with his tribe to Tayma in Northern Arabia, and had converted to Judaism before the advent of Islam) and Moses Ibn Ezra differed very little in their writings from contemporary Arab poets. Their poetry included passages borrowed from the Bible and Qur'an as well as allusions to both works. The Arabic language and the related culture were only slowly adopted by Jews after the early Muslim conquests; it was not seen before the second half of the 3rd century of the Hij̲ra, and only became of real importance from the fourth to tenth centuries. Many Jewish intellectuals during this time evidenced feelings of guilt over using Arabic in their writing instead of Hebrew. The use of Arabic in poetry, secular as well as religious, remains the exception during the Middle Ages. Although Arabic was used in prose works by Jews and Muslims alike, intellectuals and poets who wrote in Judaeo-Arabic were in the minority at the time.

==== Sacred poems ====
Many of Ibn Ezra's 220 religious compositions are found in the mahzor, the traditional Jewish prayerbook for Rosh Hashanah and Yom Kippur. These penitential poems, or selichot, earned him the name HaSallach. These poems invite man to look within himself; they depict the vanity of worldly glory, the disillusion which must be experienced at last by the pleasure-seeker, and the inevitability of divine judgment.

A skillfully elaborate piece of work is his Avodah, the introduction to which is a part of the Portuguese Mahzor. Unlike his predecessors, Ibn Ezra begins his review of Biblical history not with Adam, but with the giving of the Torah. The piyyuttim which come after the text of the Temple service, especially the piyyut "Ashrei" (Happy is the eye that beheld it) are considered by many to be of remarkable beauty.

=== Philosophy ===
Ibn Ezra's philosophical contributions were considered only minor when compared to his contributions to poetry and literature. One piece of literature that highlights Ibn Ezra's philosophical viewpoints was the "Al-Maqāla bi al-Ḥadīqa fi Maʿnā al-Majāz wa al-Ḥaqīqa." This was a work in Arabic. Much of it reiterated his poetic beliefs about the relationship between man and God and the unknowability of God. Ibn Ezra's philosophy had a neoplatonic orientation with regard to the relationship between God and man. Ibn Ezra focuses on man as a microcosm so that God is considered a self-subsistent, unitary being who preceded creation, which therefore ultimately led to man's creation being perfect. He states that God's perfection cannot be comprehended by the human mind and the finite and imperfect human mind cannot know the infinite and perfect mind of God. Ibn Ezra's philosophy also addresses intellect, declaring that the active intellect was God's first creation. Ibn Ezra claims that the intellect is a pure substance from which all things are inherently created. Along with the active intellect is another form Ibn Ezra describes as the passive intellect. This form of intellect is considered to be above the active intellect and superior to the rational soul.

His "Arugat ha-Bosem" is divided into seven chapters: (i.) general remarks on God, man, and philosophy; (ii.) the unity of God; (iii.) the inadmissibility of applying attributes to God; (iv.) the impropriety of giving names to God; (v.) motion; (vi.) nature; (vii.) the intellect. The authorities quoted in this work are Hermes (identified by Ibn Ezra with Enoch), Pythagoras, Socrates, Aristotle, Plato, pseudo-Empedocles, Alfarabi, Saadia Gaon, and Solomon ibn Gabirol.

== See also ==
- Andalusi Arabic
- Taifa of Granada

== Editions ==
- Moses Ibn Ezra, Diwan, 3 vols: vol. 1 ed. by Hayim/Heinrich Brody (Berlin, 1935); vol. 2 ed. by Hayim/Heinrich Brody (Jerusalem, 1941); vol. 3 ed. by D. Pagis (Jerusalem, 1978).
- Selected Poems of Moses ibn Ezra, ed. by Heinrich Brody, trans. by Solomon Solis-Cohen (Philadelphia: Jewish Publication Society of America, 1934)
- Poems in Hebrew at Ben Yehuda Project
