= Limpieza de sangre =

Racially discriminatory term

Limpieza de sangre (Spanish: [limˈpjeθa ðe ˈsaŋɡɾe]), also known as limpeza de sangue (Portuguese: [lĩˈpezɐ ðɨ ˈsɐ̃ɡɨ], Galician: [limˈpeθɐ ðɪ ˈsaŋɡɪ]), literally 'cleanliness of blood' and meaning 'blood purity', was a racially discriminatory term used in the Portuguese Empire and Crown of Castile during the early modern period to refer to those who were considered to be Old Christians by virtue of not having Muslim, Jewish, Romani, or Agote ancestors. In both empires, the term played a major role in discrimination against suspected crypto-Jews or crypto-Muslims. Over the years it manifested into law which excluded New Christians from almost every part of society.

== Description ==
The statutes of blood purity were a legal discrimination mechanism in the Crown of Castile and Kingdom of Portugal directed against the "New Christians," a group comprising Jewish converts and Morisco minorities. These statutes required individuals seeking entry into certain institutions to prove they were descendants of Old Christians. They emerged following the revolt led by Pero de Sarmiento in Toledo (1449), which resulted in the "Sentencia-Estatuto." They were contested by ecclesiastical sectors, as they implied that baptism was insufficient to erase sins or ensure spiritual equality, contradicting Christian doctrine.

The statutes of blood purity were based on the belief that "the body's fluids, and especially blood, transmitted a certain number of moral qualities from parents to children" and that "Jews, as a people, were incapable of change despite their conversion." As stated by Friar Prudencio de Sandoval regarding the "holy and prudent" blood purity statute of the Toledo Cathedral of 1555, which served as a model for all subsequent ones:

[…] Who can deny that in the descendants of Jews persists and endures the inclination to the evil of their ancient ingratitude and ignorance, just as in Black people the inseparable accident of their blackness? […] A Jew may descend on three sides from gentlemen or Old Christians, but a single bad lineage infects and ruins him, because by their actions, in all respects, Jews are harmful.

On the other hand, it remains a subject of debate whether the Iberian statutes of blood purity were the origin of modern European racism. According to Jean-Frédéric Schaub, "the contribution of Iberian blood purity statutes to the formation of racial categories lies at the intersection of personal exclusion and collective stigmatization." According to Max Sebastián Hering Torres, "for the first time in European history, the criteria of 'race' and 'blood' were used as a strategy of marginalization. A moralist like Torrejoncillo does not hesitate to assert [in Centinela contra judíos] that Judaism is defined based on 'blood,' regardless of whether conversion to Christianity had occurred twenty-one generations earlier."

According to historian José Manuel Nieto Soria, the statutes of blood purity were the materialization of the racism in anti-converso propaganda, which held that "the intrinsic wickedness of converts" was due to the Jewish blood running through their veins.

== Context ==
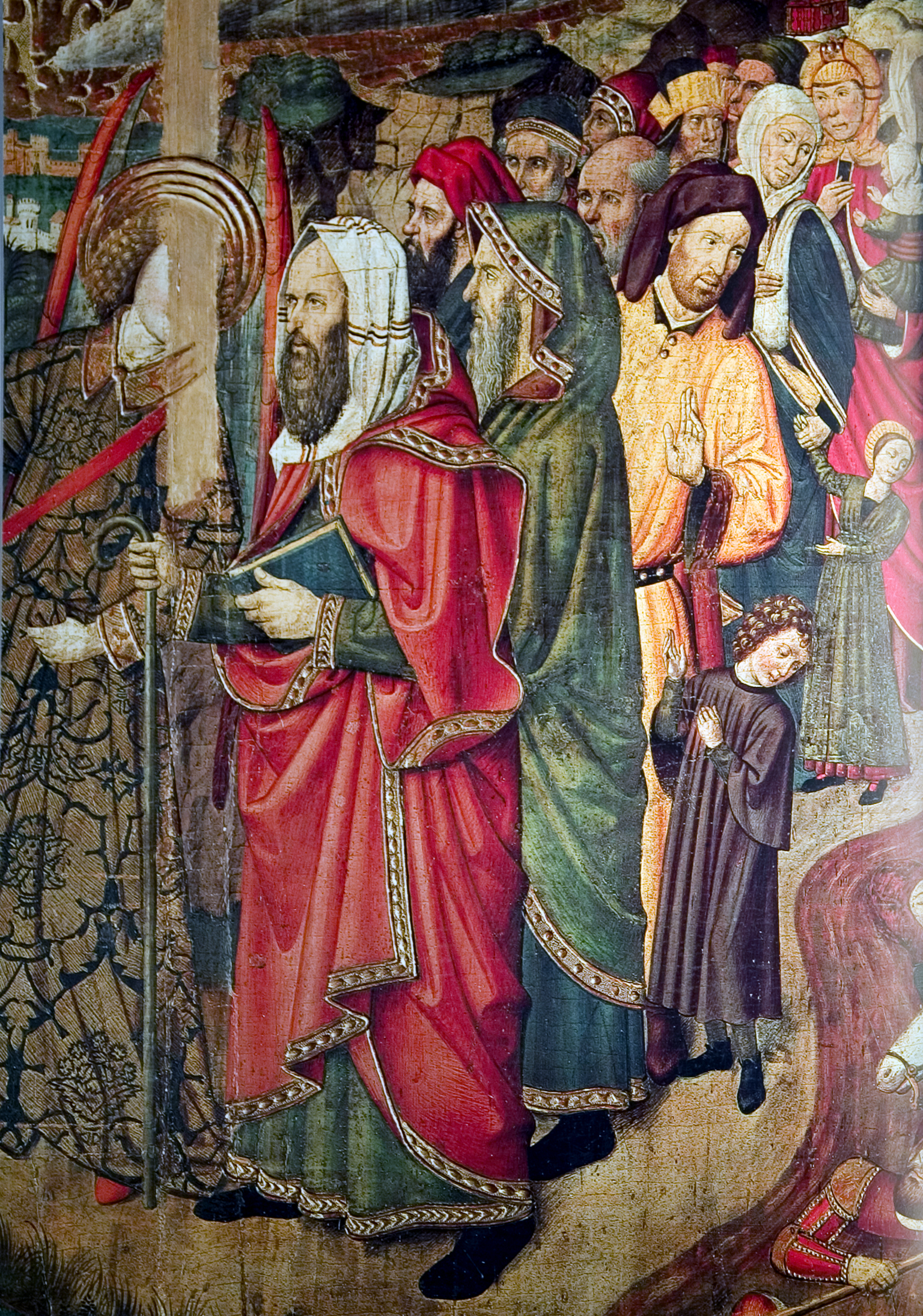
Jews in the 15th century, depicted crossing the Red Sea. Altarpiece in Barcelona Cathedral painted by Jaume Huguet (1412–1492).

According to beliefs inherited from Antiquity and the Middle Ages, blood—one of the "four humours of the human body"—was thought to have the capacity to transmit the qualities of individuals from generation to generation—through internal processes it took on the appearance of maternal milk and paternal sperm. Consequently, in ordinary and legal language, "blood" denoted "heritage"—understood both as 'lineage' (héritédité in French or heredity in English) and as 'succession of goods' (héritage in French or heritage in English)—and also had a spiritual dimension, related to the blood shed by Jesus Christ on the cross, sealing the new covenant with the Creator. In this way, "blood" was "attributed the faculty of transmitting the physical and psychic characteristics of individuals within hereditary lines." Hence, for example, the interest of social groups enjoying privileges in establishing genealogies "to root their status in an immemorial and natural superiority." As highlighted by Max Sebastián Hering Torres:

[…] fame and honor were principles that determined inclusion and exclusion within the framework of the estamental order. Honor derived from lineage, occupation, and estate and functioned as symbolic capital. However, honor was not innate, immutable, or perpetual: it had to be guarded and protected. Honor was not a closed category and could vary: criminals, vagabonds, magicians, executioners, gravediggers, and prostitutes—all were perceived as dishonored—of course—without forgetting heretics and Jews.

These latter "represented a detested minority"; but when the forced conversions following the pogroms of the late 14th century occurred, "the otherness of the Jews—visible through their clothing, housing, religious rites, and dietary practices—passed into invisibility. Invisibility meant bringing cultural practices into illegality, into the subordinate and cryptic."

Jean-Frédéric Schaub agrees with Hering Torres:

[…] before conversion, Christians already had difficulty identifying Jews. This is at least suggested by the regulations on clothing imposed on them to make them recognizable (yellow badges or red hats). But from the moment Jews received the water of baptism, their invisibility was complete.

The British Hispanist Henry Kamen has also emphasized the importance of the concept of "honor" in estamental societies. In its simplest sense, it was based on the opinion neighbors had of a person and was compromised by a crime or inappropriate conduct. It was, therefore, a social concept. The marginalized had no honor. Nor did those who professed another religion, such as Jews and Muslims. In the 15th century, with the mass conversions of Jews following the massacres of 1391 and the social ascent of these New Christians, "what began as social discrimination turned […] into social antagonism and racism," Kamen asserts. The idea spread, especially in Castile, that "Old Christians possessed honor merely by not carrying Jewish blood in their veins […] 'Though poor,' says Sancho Panza, 'I am an Old Christian and owe nothing to anyone'."

"The main argument was as follows: in the bodies of Judeoconversos, despite their belonging to Christianity, Jewish blood had a negative impact on their morality and conduct. According to Old Christians, the blood of neophytes influenced their being to such an extent that, being Christians, they continued to behave like Jews. In other words, the connection between blood characteristics and conduct persisted and manifested in the Christian body when a Jewish origin was evident," Hering Torres has explained.

== History ==
By the end of the Christian reconquest of Iberia and the forced conversion or expulsion of Muslim mudéjars and Sephardi Jews in Spain, the populations of Portugal and Spain were all nominally Christian. Spain's population of 7 million included up to a million recent converts from Islam and 200,000 converts from Judaism, who were collectively referred to as "New Christians". Converts from Judaism were referred to as conversos or Marranos and converts from Islam were known as Moriscos. A commonly leveled accusation was that the New Christians were false converts, secretly practicing their former religion as Crypto-Jews or Crypto-Muslims. After the Expulsion of the Jews in March 1492, with the Alhambra Decree, the charge of insincere conversion against Jews brought before the Spanish Inquisition only grew.

The concept of purity of blood came to be focused more on ancestry and "blood" (lineage), rather than on personal religion and beliefs.

=== Origins: The "Sentencia-Estatuto" of the City of Toledo (1449) ===
The first instances of marginalization of Judeoconversos appeared in the early decades of the 15th century: in 1436 the city of Barcelona prohibited converts from serving as notaries; and in 1446 Villena obtained a privilege from the king of Castile whereby converts could not reside within its territory. However, it was in the mid-centuries, during which both the Crown of Castile and the Crown of Aragon experienced a severe political and social crisis, that discrimination against converts gained greater significance. The most notable case was the Toledo anti-converso revolt of 1449, led by Pedro Sarmiento, during which the so-called "Sentencia-Estatuto" was approved. And on August 13, 1451, the king formally approved the Sentencia-Estatuto. This text stated that all Conversos or individuals whose parents or grandparents had converted to Christianity may not hold public or private office and cannot testify in a court of law. Although this was not an official law, many institutions in Toledo started to enforce the practice of blood purity tests and set the precedent on what it meant to be a true Christian.

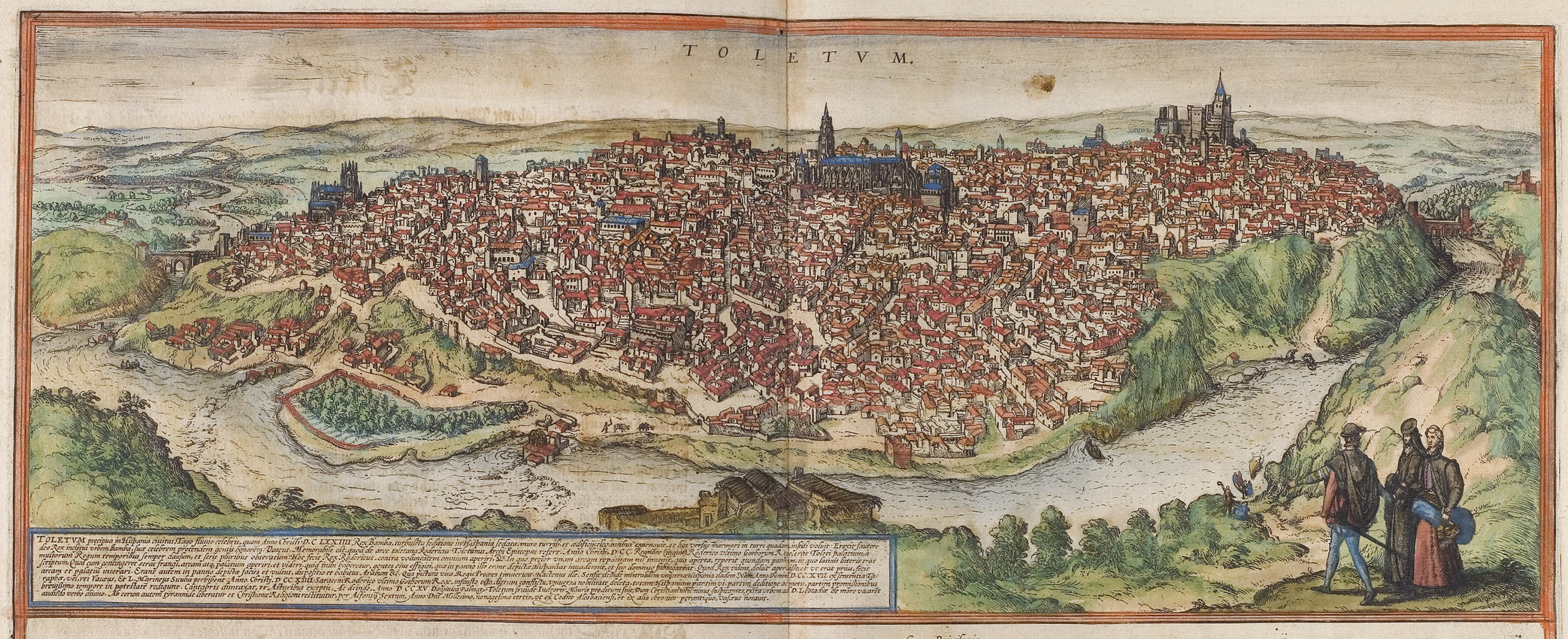
Engraving of the city of Toledo around 1570. It was in Toledo where the first statute of blood purity was approved in response to the anti-converso revolt of 1449.

The Sentencia-Estatuto of Toledo was the first statute of blood purity. It established the following:

[…] that converts of Jewish lineage, being suspected in the faith of our Lord and Savior Jesus Christ, in which they frequently relapse into Judaizing, cannot hold public or private offices or benefits whereby they may cause injuries, grievances, or mistreatment to Old Christians of good lineage.

According to Kamen, the rejection the Sentencia-Estatuto elicited among jurists and ecclesiastics shows that the idea of discrimination against New Christians was not yet widespread. The jurist Alfonso Díaz de Montalvo argued that a baptized Jew could not be treated differently from a baptized Gentile. The king's secretary, Fernán Díaz de Toledo, of converso origin, drafted an Instruction addressed to his friend Lope de Barrientos, Bishop of Cuenca and chancellor of the king, highlighting the converso origins of the main noble families of Castile. The Dominican cardinal Juan de Torquemada also criticized the Sentencia-Estatuto in his Tractatus contra Medianitas et Ismaelitas (1449). But the most significant refutation came from Alonso de Cartagena—Bishop of Burgos and son of the converso Pablo de Santa María—who in his Defensorium Unitatis Christianae (1449–1450) stated that the Catholic Church was the natural home of Jews; an argument continued by Alonso de Oropesa, also a converso and general of the Hieronymites, in his Lumen ad revelationem gentium (1465). In some cases, the statute of blood purity was even considered heretical because it denied the sacramental power of baptism. Américo Castro traced the origin of the idea of "blood purity" to the Jewish tradition itself:

Those who truly felt the scruple of blood purity were the Jews. Thanks to the translations of A. A. Neuman [The Jews in Spain], we know the legal opinions ("responsa") of rabbinical courts, which allow us to discover their previously veiled intimacy. There appears a meticulous concern for family purity and what others might say, for the "honor concerns" so characteristic of 17th-century literature. The minority Jew lived defensively against the dominant Christian, who incited or forced conversions in which the personality of their caste vanished. Hence their religious exclusivism, which the Christian did not feel before the late 15th century, though later it became a collective obsession.

The French historian Jean-Frédéric Schaub, however, has attributed the statutes of blood purity to the competition for access to positions and dignities that New Christians—finally freed from the numerous restrictions they suffered as Jews before conversion—represented for Christians, who soon began calling themselves "Old Christians." Moreover, "ecclesiastics and magistrates feared the weakening of Roman Catholic orthodoxy" that the entry of these new members into the Christian community might entail.

This stratification meant that the Old Christian commoners might assert a right to honor even if they were not in the nobility. The religious and military orders, guilds and other organizations incorporated in their by-laws clauses demanding proof of cleanliness of blood. Upwardly mobile New Christian families had to either contend with discrimination, or bribe officials and falsify documents attesting to generations of Christian ancestry.

=== Spread ===
==== Role of the Inquisition (1480–1555) ====
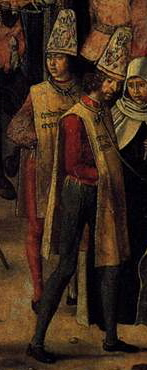
Detail of the painting Auto-da-fé by Pedro Berruguete (c. 1500), depicting two penitents of the Spanish Inquisition, probably Judeoconversos, wearing their respective sambenitos.

For Henry Kamen, "it was undoubtedly the Spanish Inquisition that, from 1480 onward, gave the greatest impetus to the spread of discrimination [against converts]."

The social antagonism, of which many Spaniards were already aware, increased at that moment with the spectacle of thousands of Judaizers, found guilty of heretical practices and condemned to the stake. It seemed as if the true religion had to be protected by excluding converts from all important positions.

Precisely the first institution to adopt a statute of blood purity, the Colegio Mayor de San Bartolomé, in Salamanca, did so in 1482, the same year the Inquisition began operating in the city. Around that time, the College of San Clemente in Bologna, which hosted many Castilians, excluded those who had fled Seville in 1480, when the Inquisition began operating there, for not being "Old Christians." In 1488, it extended the prohibition to all converts after the murder of the inquisitor Pedro Arbués in Zaragoza in 1485, who had graduated from the college. Other major colleges also adopted discriminatory statutes, such as Santa Cruz of Valladolid in 1488 or San Ildefonso in 1516. Some ecclesiastical institutions likewise adopted them, such as the monastery of Santo Tomás de Aquino in Ávila—a request formulated to the pope in 1496 by the inquisitor general Tomás de Torquemada—or the chapters of the cathedrals of Badajoz (1511) and Sevilla (1516). These statutes were condemned by the monarchy and the Church; however, in that year, Pope Alexander VI approved a purity statute for the Hieronymites.

Paradoxically, the Inquisition initially adopted a less restrictive norm of "blood purity," as in its regulations, approved by Torquemada in 1484, it "only" excluded converts and their children and grandchildren convicted by the Holy Office. This practice was supported and extended to all institutions by the Catholic Monarchs when, in 1501, they promulgated two decrees establishing that no child of someone convicted by the Inquisition could hold any office or serve as a notary, scribe, doctor, or surgeon. Thus, the Catholic Monarchs did not extend discrimination to converts in general. The statutes of blood purity that included all converts were decided independently by each institution. Apparently, the first religious order to apply the exclusion of converts was the Dominicans in 1489, followed by the Hieronymites in 1493, after the Inquisition had condemned and burned five of their members for Judaizing a few years earlier. The Franciscans approved it thirty years later, in 1525, not without strong internal opposition.

By 1530, tribunals of the Inquisition were urged to make registers of genealogies for each town. Every married man had to submit their genealogies, which registered them and their family as Old Christian or New Christian, as pure or impure. Investigations and trials would begin if one could not submit proof of a pure bloodline or there was suspicion that the individual was lying.

==== Blood Purity Statute of the Toledo Cathedral (1555) ====
The blood purity statute of the Toledo Cathedral was successively confirmed by Pope Paul III in 1548, Pope Julius III in 1550, Pope Paul IV in 1555, and King Philip II in 1556. This statute remained in effect for centuries and was not abolished until 1865.

Following this statute:

The Statutes of Blood Purity multiplied across Spain in an overwhelming manner. Brotherhoods and guilds began to exclude converts from their ranks. The main religious orders followed the same path: Hieronymites, Franciscans, Dominicans, military orders, and university colleges. In 1541, the Statute had already been established in the cathedrals of Badajoz, Seville, Jaén, Córdoba, Oviedo, León, and Sigüenza. In 1530, it had been established in the Chapel of the Kings of the Toledo Cathedral.

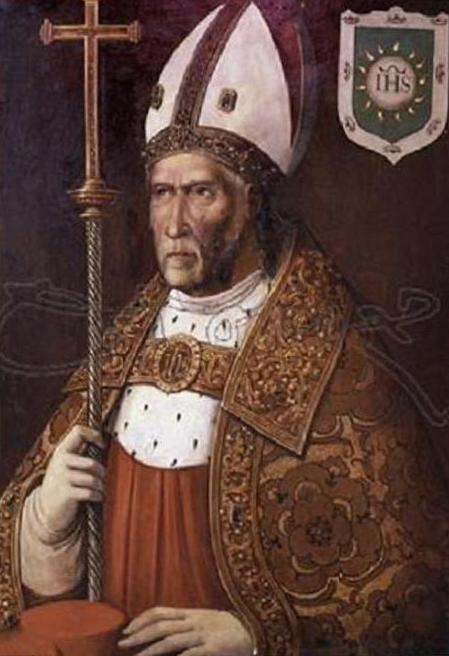
Portrait of Juan Martínez Silíceo, Archbishop of Toledo, by Francisco de Comontes, 16th century.

Regarding episcopal sees, only some adopted statutes of blood purity (Seville, Córdoba, Jaén, Osma, León, Oviedo, and Valencia). The most important, Toledo, did so, though not without significant controversy involving the papacy and the monarchy. For many years, members of the chapter of the Toledo Cathedral had resisted the introduction of a blood purity statute for admission, until the new archbishop appointed in 1546, Juan Martínez Silíceo, who was very proud of being an Old Christian, opposed the appointment of a convert—whose father had been convicted by the Inquisition—for a vacant canonry in the cathedral. Silíceo succeeded in having the pope revoke the appointment—he wrote in a letter that if the convert were admitted, it would turn the Toledan see into a "new synagogue"—and subsequently, on July 23, 1547, convened a chapter meeting where, by a vote of 24 to 10, a blood purity statute was approved. During the debate, Archbishop Silíceo used the term "race"—as a synonym for "lineage"—for the first time in the context of "blood purity."

[…] a statute was proposed by us, Archbishop of Toledo, in this Holy Church, which stipulated that from that day forward all Beneficiaries of that Holy Church, whether Dignitaries, Canons, Rationaries, Chaplains, or Clerks, be Old Christians without race of Jew, Moor, or heretic.

Immediately, the archdeacons of Guadalajara and Talavera protested, threatening to appeal to the pope. The Toledo city council also opposed it, arguing that it would awaken "hatreds and perpetual enmities"; thus, it requested the intervention of Prince Philip, who governed the peninsular kingdoms in the absence of his father, Emperor and King Charles I. Philip sought the opinion of the Council of Castile, which recommended suspending the statute, deeming it "unjust and scandalous" and noting that "many inconveniences could arise from its execution." This view was shared by a clergy committee convened for that purpose and by the University of Alcalá, which condemned it as a source of "discord sown by the devil."

Thus, in September 1547, the statute was suspended. Nevertheless, in 1555 the pope approved it, and subsequently Philip, now king, ratified it. Apparently, he was convinced by several of his anti-Jewish advisors and by Archbishop Silíceo himself, who claimed that "all the heresies that have occurred in Germany and France were sown by descendants of Jews, as we have seen and see daily in Spain." In his zeal to secure the introduction of the blood purity statute in the Toledo Cathedral, the priest Melchor Izo even forged an alleged Letter of the Jews of Constantinople sent to the Jews of Zaragoza in 1492 to provide "proof" of a Jewish plot to, through converts, destroy Christians and "violate their temples, and profane their sacraments and sacrifices."

After its approval, the blood purity statute of the Toledo Cathedral became the model for subsequent statutes. In his famous Life and Deeds of Emperor Charles V, the Benedictine chronicler Friar Prudencio de Sandoval justified this "holy and prudent statute that none with the race of a convert could be prebendary in it ["in the holy Church of Toledo"]":

[…] because where there is someone of such bad race, rarely is there one, for this people is so malignant that one suffices to disturb many. I do not condemn Christian piety that embraces all; that would be a mortal error, and I know that in the divine regard, there is no distinction between Gentile and Jew; for there is only one Lord of all. But [who] can deny that in the descendants of Jews persists and endures the evil inclination of their ancient ingratitude and ignorance, as in Black people the inseparable accident of their blackness? […] [T]hat if they [Black people] join with white women a thousand times, the children are born with the brown color of their fathers. Thus, for the Jew, it is not enough to be noble on three sides or an Old Christian, for a single race infects and damages him, to be in his deeds in all ways extremely harmful to communities.

Jean-Frédéric Schaub has noted that the century separating the two Toledan documents, that of 1449 and that of 1555, "is the transition from medieval persecutions to new forms of collective exclusion."

It is in this that the question of the relationship between the Iberian ideology of purity [of blood] and modern racism takes on its meaning. For a long time, the arsenal of exclusion remained complex and diversified: the social position of the examined individuals and the sincerity of their Christian faith weighed as much as their family ancestry […] However, several developments favored a reading increasingly based on the lineage of individuals.

Thus, "the 15th-century Iberian Peninsula is characterized by the shift from a society marked by the opposition between Christians and non-Christians to a society divided between Old Christians, New Christians, and non-Christians."

==== Blood purity statutes after 1555 ====
At the University of Salamanca, an attempt was made to introduce a blood purity statute in 1562, but the faculty resolved "that it should not be done for now." Three years earlier, a well-known convert, Martín Martínez de Cantalapiedra, had been appointed professor of Hebrew, as had another before him, Pablo Coronel.

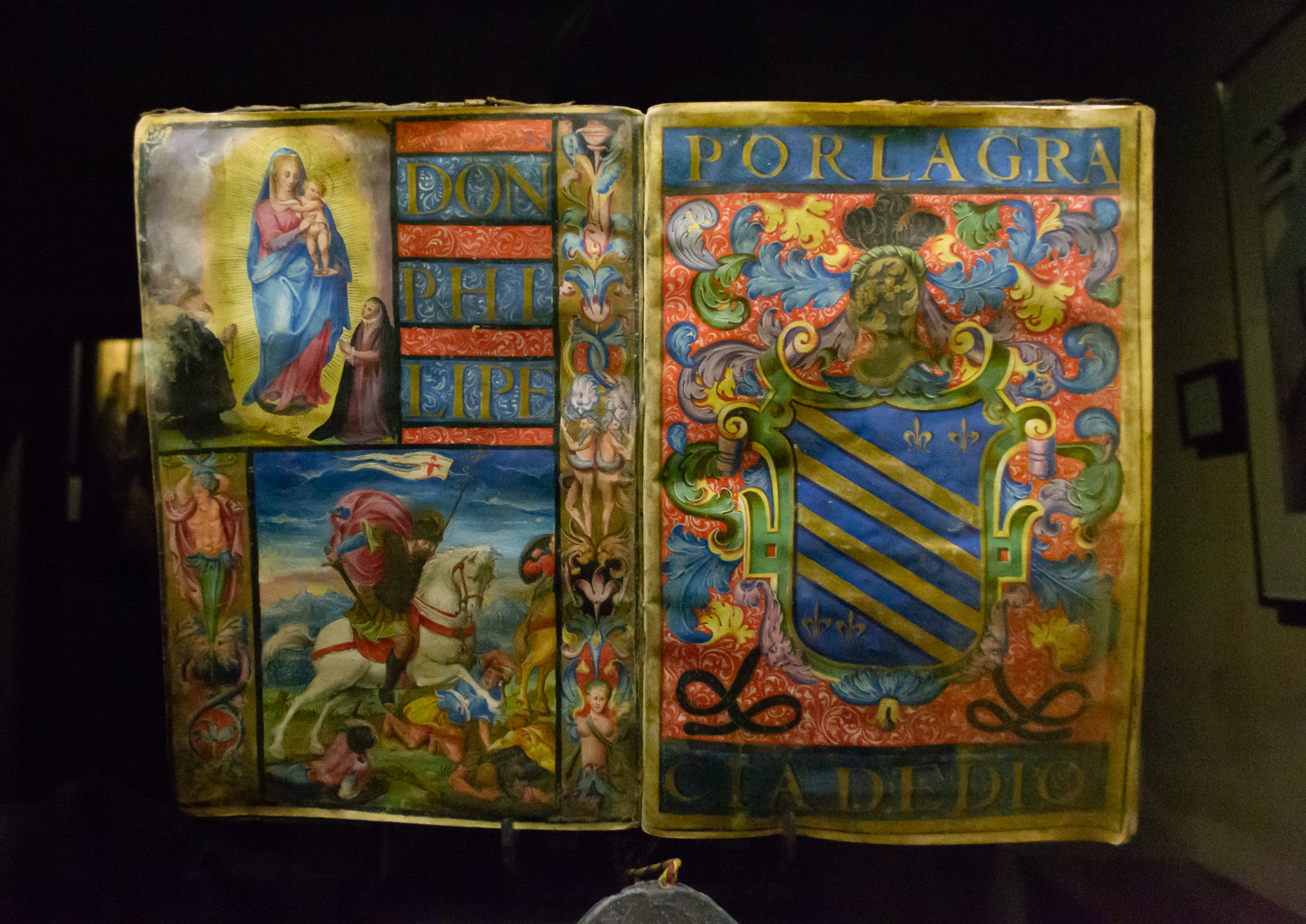
Ejecutoria or blood purity process of the Crespo López family (Granada, Palacio de los Olvidados). Those seeking to access certain positions had to prove that none of their ancestors had been convicted by the Spanish Inquisition or were Jewish or Muslim. If the genealogical evidence presented was deemed insufficient, a commission was appointed to visit localities where information could be obtained and to take sworn statements from witnesses about the candidate's ancestors. The process could take years and frequently involved bribery and perjury to prove one was an "Old Christian."

Although the institutions requiring blood purity proofs were relatively few, converts saw their social advancement opportunities severely limited by their inability to access some of them, such as the major colleges or military orders. According to Henry Kamen, the "statute communities," as they were called, were limited to the six major colleges of Castile; some religious orders (Hieronymites, Dominicans, and Franciscans); the Inquisition, which approved its blood purity statute in 1572; and some cathedrals (Toledo, Seville, Córdoba, Jaén, Osma, León, Oviedo, and Valencia). Practically only one secular sector was affected by the statutes: the military orders (the Order of Santiago adopted one of these statutes late, in 1555) and its administrative body, the Council of Orders. Some legal matters, such as the mayorazgo, also established blood purity conditions. Finally, a handful of municipalities and brotherhoods, scattered across Castile, also practiced exclusion. However, some of these institutions were very significant, such as the major colleges, since excluding converts meant closing off their path to high ecclesiastical and state positions, or the military orders, since encomiendas were one way to access nobility. "The outlook, evidently, was bleak for converts," Kamen asserts.

Kamen warns that "the statutes never formed part of Spanish public law and never appeared in any body of public law. Their validity was restricted only to those institutions that had adopted them." Moreover, the statutes existed almost exclusively in the Crown of Castile. In Catalonia, they were unknown. Likewise, the statutes were always heavily criticized, did not enjoy wide acceptance, and in many cases were not enforced, besides being circumventable through bribery or the presentation of false evidence. For example, in 1557, a year after Philip II confirmed the statute of the Toledo Cathedral, a convert was appointed as a canon. According to Kamen, entry into the nobility did not require blood purity, although converts convicted by the Inquisition for heresy could be excluded.

However, the barrier of blood purity existed. Those seeking to access certain positions had to prove that none of their ancestors had been convicted by the Inquisition or were Jewish or Muslim. If the genealogical evidence presented was deemed insufficient, a commission was appointed to visit localities where information could be obtained and to take sworn statements from witnesses about the candidate's ancestors—sometimes a mere rumor was enough to cast doubt on their "blood purity." The process could take years and frequently involved bribery and perjury to prove one was an "Old Christian."

Jean-Frédéric Schaub has noted that the new division between "Old Christians" and "New Christians" (and not Christians), which had replaced the medieval one between Christians and non-Christians, translated into a widespread interest in genealogy. "Everywhere, families devoted themselves to establishing their ancestry to better affirm their social position. Old Christians wished to prove they were not mixed with converts. New Christians, through recourse to falsification, attempted to erase the traces of their ancestors' past." "These procedures accredited the idea that the body's fluids, and especially blood, transmitted from parents to children a certain number of moral qualities."

In the processes to establish blood purity, witnesses were asked "if they know that" the candidate (for entry into an institution requiring this condition) and their family ancestors "all and each of them have been and are Old Christians, pure, of clean blood, without race or stain, nor descent from Jews, Moors, converts, nor of any newly converted sect, and are held and commonly reputed as such." Here, "race" was understood as a "stained" lineage, which was the most widespread conception in the Hispanic Monarchy. Thus, "Old Christians" had no "race." "Race in lineages is taken in a bad sense, as having some race of Moor or Jew," it was said in the Tesoro de la lengua castellana o española (1611) by Sebastián de Covarrubias.

As the original sambenitos deteriorated, they were copied in new collective sheets, known as mantas, "blankets", as in this 1550s oil on canvas from Coruña del Conde, Burgos, Spain. It reproduces the sambenitos of judaizers and Lutherans from 1490-1509. It has been argued that it has been subjected to aggressive restoration. For example, 1509 is eight years before Luther's Wittenberg Theses.

What most concerned contemporaries was that the "infamy" that fell upon a person also fell upon their family and descendants. Hence, court sentences involving public shame were more feared than the death penalty. It was considered that the stigma affecting a person and a lineage was perpetual and could not even be erased by baptism. This doctrine—"basically racist," according to Kamen—was promoted by the Inquisition with its custom of hanging sambenitos in a visible place, once the condemned had completed their punishment, "so that there would always be memory of the infamy of the heretics and their descendants." Even when the sambenitos became old, they were replaced with new ones so that the "infamy" of a lineage would not be forgotten. This custom persisted until the late 18th century. "These sambenitos were deeply hated not only by the affected families but also by the regions to which the churches where they were hung belonged, which brought them ignominy." The limpieza de sangre statutes coalesced to become a systematic effort to exclude conversos from offices in Church and state. They multiplied rapidly due to strong support by cathedral chapters and the colegios mayores (senior colleges), a type of fraternity which included scholarships, tutorial services, and in some cases even chairs within the university structure. This hyper-focus on the purity of blood among individuals with any level of power promoted the elite and exclusive nature of these positions, which were also imbued in and promoted by the letrado bureaucracy, professional civil servants usually with degrees in law as well as churchmen formed a large majority of the Spanish civil service in the sixteenth century. Access to these elite positions was then passed down from generation to generation of graduates from these universities, thus perpetuating an anti-converso mindset.

One example of how limpieza de sangre laws were applied is found in a legal brief composed on behalf of Pedro Francisco Molines concerning his betrothal to Maria Aguiló. This brief argues that he cannot, should not, and will not, marry Maria. It claims that Maria is not of "pure blood," and because of this Pedro has no legal obligation to marry her, and can refuse to do so as not to dirty his clean blood, "being that the aforementioned Aguiló has proven to be the descendant of Jews, and these being disgraced, by said infamy, even if they had been engaged, said Molines should not marry her; because he is of clean blood..." This insistence of the purity of blood not only squelched many familial lines that were established over centuries but also prevented many upward-moving Spaniards of "dirty lineage" from establishing themselves and their families in the socio-economic system of the times. These families were thus pushed to the sidelines of society due to a perceived impurity. This cultivated a connection between ancestry and impurity, values that would consolidate into racism as we understand it today, which was only beginning to form at this time. The last page of the brief also notes that the judge has the right even to imprison Pedro until he finds a more suitable woman of "pure blood" to marry. The brief then closes with the signatures of 15 men agreeing with the clauses and arguments found in it. Many of the signatories are either friars or scholars of canon law, which demonstrates the staunch religious support the limpieza de sangre statutes found.

These statutes were closely related to the Spanish Inquisition. Together they formed a system that bred fear and encouraged hostile witnesses and even perjury, a system under which the discovery of an ancestor with Jewish blood could result in a person's entire familial line losing everything. This practice set the foundations of "race"-based antisemitism.

The limpieza de sangre statutes were not without their dissenters, however, as they potentially challenged the social status of every segment of the population, including conversos and moriscos, the aristocracy who stood to lose standing, the agricultural workers who farmed their lands, and Catholic reformers who saw it as a challenge to the efficacy of baptism and a perversion of Christ's Millennialism. While these statutes were broadly supported by the highest echelons of power, some of the Spanish population was not in favor of legislated segregation by blood. Many religious leaders condemned the laws, such as Pope Nicholas V in 1451, the Bishop of Cuenca after the initial laws in 1449, Archbishop Carrillo of Toledo, Pope Paul IV of Rome, and many others. However, there were just as many voices who supported the statutes.

=== Testing and eventual decline ===
By 1530, tribunals of the Inquisition were urged to make registers of genealogies for each town. Every married man had to submit their genealogies, which registered them and their family as Old Christian or New Christian, as pure or impure. Investigations and trials would begin if one could not submit proof of a pure bloodline or there was suspicion that the individual was lying.

Tests of limpieza de sangre had begun to lose their utility by the 18th century; by then, only rarely did persons have to endure the gruelling inquisitions into distant parentage through birth records. However, laws requiring limpieza de sangre were sometimes maintained even into the 19th century. For example, an edict of 8 March 1804 by King Ferdinand VII resolved that no knight of the military orders might wed without having a council vouch for the limpieza de sangre of his spouse.

Official suppression of such entry requirements for the Army was enacted into law on 16 May 1865, and extended to naval appointments on 31 August of the same year. On 5 November 1865, a decree allowed children born out of wedlock, for whom ancestry could not be verified, to be able to enter into religious higher education (canons). On 26 October 1866, the test of blood purity was outlawed to determine who might be admitted to college. On 20 March 1870, a decree suppressed all use of blood purity standards to determine eligibility for any government position or licensed profession.

The belief among Basque intellectuals of the 19th century that the "Basque race" was free of foreign miscegenation became one of the bases of the racism in Sabino Arana's Basque nationalism.

The discrimination was still present into the 20th century in some places such as Mallorca, where no Xueta (descendants of the Mallorcan conversos) priests were allowed to say Mass in a cathedral until the 1960s. During the Spanish Civil War, when Fascist Italy occupied Mallorca in alliance with the Nationalist faction of Spain. Nazi authorities requested lists of persons with Jewish ancestry, planning to deport them to camps in France and in Italy, but the intervention of the bishop of Mallorca Josep Miralles blocked their delivery. The mixing of German troops and the Corpo Truppe Volontarie with locals led some Palma women intending to marry foreign soldiers to obtain from Mayor Mateo Zaforteza Musoles certificates of not having Jewish ancestry. Although all those laws were suspended by the end of the 19th century, they set a precedent which allowed for a new form of religious discrimination based on blood.

==== Procedure to judge purity of blood ====
The earliest known case judging limpieza de sangre comes from the Church of Cordoba, which explained the procedure to judge the purity of blood of candidates as follows: kneeling, with the right hand placed over the image of a crucifix on a Bible, the candidates confirmed themselves as being of neither Jewish or Moorish extraction. The investigation process is as follows: commissioners and secretaries with notaries would be sent to the tribunals from which the individual under investigation claimed to have originated. They would then gather eight to twelve elders from the tribunal as witnesses and have them testify. The information would then be sent back while the individual awaited trial. Having collected all the reports, the secretary or the notary had to read them all to the council, and a simple majority vote would decide whether the candidate was approved; after approval the candidate had to promise to obey all the laws and customs of the Church. If the court identified them as of Jewish descent, the individual and their children would be socially outcast and labeled impure The man from the Church of Cordoba was able to prove his ancestry was free of Jewish or Muslim blood.

Another man from Córdoba, Juan Rubio de Herrera, worked as a representative of the king of Spain in Rome. Pope Paul V granted him a sinecure of medio racionero at the Córdoba Cathedral in 1619. Since the position was reserved to Old Christians, the Córdoba chapter researched his ancestry, the fame of his family and the sambenitos. As witnesses remembered rumors against his family and evidence was collected that he was a descendant of judaizers condemned one century earlier, he was rejected for the position after a 1625 trial. In spite of this, his tomb in San Giacomo dei Spagnoli gives him the title, since the Spanish norms did not rule in Rome.

=== Criticism and opposition to the Statutes ===
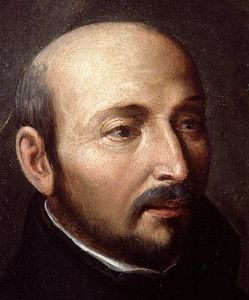
Ignatius of Loyola

The statutes of blood purity were criticized by certain sectors, as in the case of the Toledo Cathedral or the University of Salamanca. One of the most resolute opponents of the statutes was Ignatius of Loyola, founder of the Society of Jesus, who once stated that he would have liked to descend from Jews because it would make him "a relative of Christ Our Lord and of Our Lady the glorious Virgin Mary." He described the cult of blood purity as "the Spanish humor." Thus, the Jesuits admitted converts, of whom the rector of the Jesuit college in Alcalá wrote in a letter to Ignatius of Loyola: "more virtue is found among them than among Old Christians and nobles." The successor to Ignatius of Loyola as general of the Society in 1556 was a convert, Diego Laínez, which provoked opposition from certain Church sectors. Francis Borgia, Laínez's successor and an Old Christian, wrote in a letter that for the Lord "there is no acceptance of persons nor distinction between Greek and Jew, between barbarian and Scythian." Pressures on the Jesuits increased, sometimes portraying them as a group of Jews, until in 1593 they approved the exclusion of converts. However, the measure was repealed fifteen years later when it was agreed to allow entry to converts who had been Christians for five generations ("by that date, most converts in Spain had, in fact, been Christians for five generations as a result of the forced conversions of 1492," so converts could be readmitted to the Society). Shortly before, the Jesuit Juan de Mariana had written in his treatise El rey (1599) a harsh critique of the statutes of blood purity, arguing that "the marks of infamy should not be eternal, and a deadline must be set beyond which descendants should not pay for the faults of their ancestors."

That same year of 1599, the most resounding plea ever written against the statutes was published, causing great commotion because its author had been a member of the Inquisition and was also a prestigious 76-year-old Dominican theologian. This was Agustín Salucio, who in his Discurso presented two criticisms of the statutes: that they were no longer relevant because there were no longer converts Judaizing, and that they had brought more harm than good—"they say peace cannot exist with the republic divided into two factions," he stated. He concluded: "Great wisdom would be to ensure the kingdom's peace by limiting the statutes, so that from Old Christians and Moriscos and converts, all might form a united body and all be Old Christians and secure."

Salucio's book, which received support from many civil and ecclesiastical authorities, triggered a major crisis within the Inquisition. The first reaction of the Council of the Supreme Inquisition was to ban the book, but they could not stop its circulation because Salucio had sent copies to the procurators of the Cortes of Castile, who demanded the intervention of King Philip III to resolve the issue, noting that "in Spain we value a pechero man and 'clean' more than a hidalgo who is not 'clean.'" The king's valido, the Duke of Lerma, commissioned a report from the Grand Inquisitor, who praised Salucio's book, but despite this, the book remained banned. The claim to universal hidalguía (lowest nobility) of the Basques was justified by intellectuals such as Manuel Larramendi (1690–1766). Because the Umayyad conquest of Hispania had not reached the Basque territories, it was believed that Basques had maintained their original purity, while the rest of Spain was suspect of miscegenation. The universal hidalguía of Basques helped many of them to positions of power in the administration. This idea was reinforced by the fact that, as a result of the Reconquista, numerous Spanish noble lineages were already of Basque origin.

Following Salucio's book, others criticizing the statutes were written, some by prominent Inquisition members. However, it was not until the rise to power in 1621 of the Count-Duke of Olivares, after the accession of Philip IV, that action was taken to change them. In 1623, the Junta de Reformación decreed new rules modifying the practice of the statutes. Proofs of purity were eliminated each time someone was promoted or changed jobs, rumors were disregarded for determining blood purity, and oral testimonies unsupported by solid evidence were prohibited, as was the dissemination of works listing families of Jewish origin, such as the "Libro verde de Aragón." However, the "councils, courts, major colleges, and communities with statutes" to which the reform was directed seem to have ignored it, despite a member of the Junta de Reformación writing that they were

the cause and origin of a great multitude of sins, perjuries, falsehoods, quarrels, deaths, criminal and civil lawsuits, and that many of ours, seeing they are not admitted to the honors and offices of their homeland, have left these kingdoms and gone to others, despairing of being infamed.

In 1626, the Council of the Supreme Inquisition, at the behest of the Count-Duke of Olivares, published, according to Henry Kamen, "the most extraordinary document ever to emerge from its bosom." It was a frontal critique of the statutes, stating among other things:

To a great extent, thoughts so conformable to those of God are hindered if such odious divisions and such bloody animosities persist as those between those considered 'clean' and those reputed to be stained with Jewish race.
It follows that, since what gave rise to the statutes has completely ceased, it would be civil and political prudence, at least, for the rigor in their execution to cease.

However, only two years later, the Council of the Supreme declared by majority vote that "we hold it certain that the observance of the statutes of purity is just and laudable." For his part, the poet Francisco de Quevedo accused the Count-Duke of Olivares of being an agent of the Jews, simply because he had resorted to networks of "Portuguese bankers" of Marrano descent (at that time the Kingdom of Portugal was part of the Hispanic Monarchy). Thus, the statutes continued despite all the criticisms reiterating that "it is absurd and greatly prejudicial."

=== Persistence in the 18th century and 19th century ===
Tests of limpieza de sangre had begun to lose their utility by the 18th century; by then, only rarely did persons have to endure the gruelling inquisitions into distant parentage through birth records. However, laws requiring limpieza de sangre were sometimes maintained even into the 19th century. For example, an edict of 8 March 1804 by King Ferdinand VII resolved that no knight of the military orders might wed without having a council vouch for the limpieza de sangre of his spouse.

According to Henry Kamen, blood purity "was never officially accepted in Spanish law, nor in most institutions, churches, or municipalities of Spain. The deepest damage it did, as with other racial discriminations, was in the realm of status, social rank, and promotion. But at no time did it become a national obsession. [...] By the late 17th century, the few statutes that still persisted were openly ignored and violated at every turn." The only exception was the case of the Xuetas of Mallorca, whose discrimination persisted until the second half of the 19th century.

However, as Kamen acknowledges, the Enlightenment ministers of the Bourbon Reforms, influenced by the new ideas of scientific racism of the Age of Enlightenment, did not abolish them despite criticizing them—the Count of Floridablanca condemned them because "the holiest action of man, which is his conversion to our holy faith, is punished with the same penalty as the greatest crime, which is to apostatize from it." Moreover, in the 18th century, the idea of blood purity was also understood as purity of occupations, meaning not having performed any "servile" trade or commerce. As evidence of their long persistence, it can be cited that as late as 1804, King Charles IV established that no knight of a military order could marry without a council determining the "purity of blood" of the spouse.

The statutes of blood purity were abolished by a royal order of January 31, 1835, within the framework of the Spanish Liberal Revolution that ended the Old Regime, although they remained in place for army officers until 1859. A law of May 1865 abolished blood purity proofs for marriages and certain civil and military positions. That same year, those whose "purity of blood" could not be established (i.e., those born out of wedlock) were allowed to enter higher religious education, and a year later, the blood purity examination was eliminated as a condition for admission to secular higher education. As late as 1870, "purity of blood" ceased to be a criterion for admission to professorships or public administration positions.

== Society of Jesus ==
Ignatius of Loyola, the founder of the Jesuits, said that "he would take it as a special grace from our Lord to come from Jewish lineage". In the first 30 years of the Society of Jesus, many Jesuits were conversos. However, an anti-converso faction led to the Decree de genere (1593), which proclaimed that either Jewish or Muslim ancestry, no matter how distant, was an insurmountable impediment for admission to the Society of Jesus – effectively applying the Spanish principle of Limpieza de sangre to Jesuits Europe-wide and world-wide.

Aleksander Maryks interprets the 1593 decree as preventing, despite Ignatius's desires, any Jewish or Muslim Conversos and, by extension, any person with Jewish or Muslim ancestry, no matter how distant, from admission to the Society of Jesus. Jesuit scholar John Padberg states that the restriction on Jewish/Muslim converts was only limited to the degree of parentage. Fourteen years later, this restriction was extended back to the fifth degree. This 16th-century Decree de genere remained in force among the Jesuits far longer than it remained in force in the Spanish state, but over time, the restriction which was related to Muslim ancestry was dropped only leaving people of Jewish ancestry to be excluded. In 1923, the 27th Jesuit General Congregation reiterated, "The impediment of origin extends to all who are descended from the Jewish race, unless it is clear that their father, grandfather, and great grandfather have belonged to the Catholic Church." Only in 1946, in the aftermath of World War II, did the 29th General Congregation drop the requirement, but it still called for "cautions to be exercised before admitting a candidate about whom there is some doubt as to the character of his hereditary background.

== Spanish colonies ==
The concept of limpieza de sangre was a significant barrier for many Spaniards to emigrate to the Americas, since some form of proof of not having recent Muslim or Jewish ancestors was required to emigrate to the Spanish Empire. However, within Spain's overseas territories the concept evolved to be linked with racial purity for both Spaniards and indigenous. Proofs of racial purity were required in a variety of circumstances in both Spain and its overseas territories. Candidates for office and their spouses had to obtain a certificate of purity that proved that they had no Jewish or Muslim ancestors and in New Spain, proof of whiteness and absence of any in the lineage who had engaged in work with their hands.

Additionally, as early as the sixteenth century, shortly after the Spanish colonization of the Americas was initiated, several regulations were enacted in the Laws of the Indies to prevent Jews and Muslims and their descendants from emigrating to and settling in the overseas colonies. There was a thriving business in creating false documentation to allow conversos to emigrate to Spain's overseas territories. The provisions banning emigration were repeatedly stressed in later editions of the Laws, which provides an indication that the regulations were often ignored, most likely because colonial authorities at the time looked the other way as the skills of those immigrants were badly needed. During the period when Portugal and Spain were ruled by the same monarch (1580–1640), Portuguese merchants, many of whom were crypto-Jews, passing as Christians, became important members of the merchant communities in the viceregal capitals of Mexico City and Lima. When Portugal successfully revolted in 1640 from Spain, the Holy Office of the Inquisition in both capitals initiated intensive investigations to identify and prosecute crypto-Jews, resulting in spectacular autos-da-fé in the mid-seventeenth century.

== Colonial castes in America ==
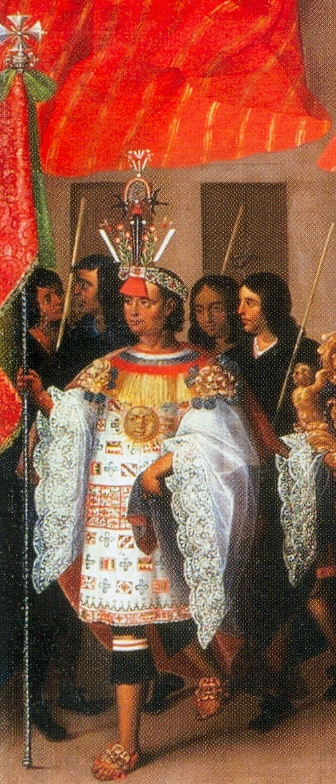
An Alférez Real de los Incas, "Parish of San Sebastián Parade" (Corpus Christi Series, Cuzco).

Regarding the native inhabitants of Spanish America, the indigenous people were considered of "pure blood" due to their status as Gentiles and newly incorporated Christians, equated with the first Christians or primitive Christians. By virtue of this interpretation, caciques and principal indigenous nobles could directly obtain certificates of blood purity, allowing them to access the legal and social privileges of the nobility, as well as enjoy dignities and honors within the Hispanic Monarchy, including the peninsula itself.

Regarding Spaniards, the statutes of blood purity were applied in America as a discrimination tool to access high aristocratic, military, or ecclesiastical positions, reserved for "Peninsulars," Criollos, or members of certain "castes." Their purpose was to certify the absence of Jewish or Morisco ancestry. On the other hand, numerous edicts appear in the Recopilación de las Leyes de Indias, which prevented converts, their descendants, and those reconciled by the Inquisition from traveling to America. This repeated reiteration has been considered by some authors as an indication that these provisions were often ignored. However, these titles could be acquired through purchase or granted by royal favor. Since they were used only to occupy high hierarchies, they were irrelevant in a colonial society marked by increasing mestizaje, to the point that caste and skin color differences became increasingly blurred.

However, the British historian John Elliott described Hispanic American colonial society as a "pigmentocracia," where the mixing of blood among racialized groups functioned as a control mechanism for the elite. The accusation of "mixed blood" (mestizaje between Spaniards, indigenous people, or Africans) served to justify a discriminatory policy that could exclude them from public offices, municipal corporations, religious orders, universities, guilds, and brotherhoods, and various colonial positions. For Elliott, "Spanish colonial America developed into a society coded by color." However, skin color was not an isolated judgment criterion but was accompanied by other elements such as legitimacy through legal birth, symbols of social status, or blood purity.

The Colombian historian Max Sebastián Hering Torres states: "indigenous nobility was declared pure and, in this sense, equated with Old Christians." "Through blood purity, not only were new axioms of honor constructed; imaginary symbolic boundaries were also built between the pure and the impure, the superior and the inferior. Through the construction of these binary categories, the integrative impact of baptism was undermined, to the extent that origin, heritage, and the body operated as platforms for inclusion or exclusion. We conclude then that, from a peninsular racial anti-Judaism, blood purity in the Americas became a colonial racialization strategy, as it hierarchically coded social relations through bodily and cultural symbols."

Thus, as Hering Torres has also pointed out, blood purity "in the Hispanic American context underwent an important change by being, only in this case, linked to estamental logics. Nevertheless, and excepting the above, it is clear that in Hispanic America, blood purity articulated with skin color and had an impact on the majority of the 'non-white' population without privileges." "The concept of 'race' in the Colony meant, as in Spain, lineage. And, as there, in the New World 'race' also implied having a defect, a stain in the lineage. But, unlike Spain, the blemish was demonstrated not only through memory and a person's quality but also from skin color, (especially from the late 17th century and throughout the 18th) " in the Viceroyalty of New Granada. Thus, in blood purity processes, what was determined was "whiteness," as "non-white" became synonymous with impurity and "white" with purity and quality. In a 1766 process, one witness declared that the candidate and his wife were "free of any bad race, Indian, Black, or Mulatto." In another 1757 process, the witness stated that he knew the candidate "by sight, dealings, and communication" and "since he came to this city […] has been held, known, and reputed as a white man without stains or mixture of bad race in his birth and as such was admitted to the Colegio del Rosario of said city of Santafe." As late as 1789, the Capuchin Joaquín de Finestrad wrote in his work El vasallo Instruido that "whites" "nature itself did not wish to debase with the ignominious stain carried by the blood of Black, Zambo, Mulatto, and other castes of people, excepting pure Indians." "Faced with the difficulty of classifying the various caste definitions, in the late colony, all these symbolic, economic, social, phenotypic, and varying degrees of purity and impurity delimitations partially dissolved."

Thus, the segregation barriers between "Spaniards" and castes were not insurmountable. In the series of caste paintings attributed to the Novohispanic painter José Joaquín Magón, it was said: "If the compound is born of a Spaniard and an Indian, the stain disappears by the third degree, because it is reckoned that from a Spaniard and an Indian comes a Mestizo, from this and a Spaniard a Castizo, and from this and a Spaniard already a Spaniard." Moreover, since the late 16th century, mestizos of legitimate descent could purchase from the Crown, always in need of funds, a certificate classifying them as "Spaniards," with all the advantages that implied for their descendants. Nevertheless, for historian María Eugenia Chávez, "If we accept that the framework of significance of differences anchored in the concepts of race and racial differences emerges from the mid-18th century in the context of the decline of Iberian colonial power and the consolidation of new colonial powers in northern Europe, the application of these concepts is evidently anachronistic."

== European racism ==
As noted by Max Sebastián Hering Torres of the National University of Colombia, "blood purity has been interpreted from multiple perspectives, and there is no consensus on its meaning within the History of racism." Cecil Roth labeled it in 1940 as "racial antisemitism" and the "precedent of 20th-century Aryan legislation," while the Spanish historian Antonio Domínguez Ortiz considered the doctrine of blood purity as "pure racism." Other historians, however, have opposed these theses. Guido Kisch argued against Roth: "The concept and racial doctrine have no basis in medieval ecclesiastical or secular law." For his part, Francisco Márquez Villanueva denied the racist meaning of blood purity for not being based on indelible biologisms.

The French historian Jean-Frédéric Schaub wondered in 2014 whether "the statutes of blood purity were at the origin of European racism" and answered that "the response must be nuanced."

On one hand, the rules of the statutes and inquisitorial procedures gave strength to the idea that moral qualities were transmitted through the body's fluids and tissues, from generation to generation. These exclusion instruments were intended to isolate within society groups and families that, however, resembled their neighbors and fellow citizens. Neither their language, nor the color of their skin, nor even the religion they professed was the cause of rejection. This is why it was necessary to reveal their hidden nature, a nature evil and dangerous to the majority society. From this perspective, the purification work of Iberian societies upon themselves was an important stage in the history of racial categories. On the other hand, throughout the modern era, the racial characterization of people and groups was mixed with social, religious, and even climatic or astrological considerations, among others. One must wait for a more recent era for the racial category to be sufficient on its own to define people and communities. In the 17th century, Europe was not yet there.

Hering Torres has defended a thesis that presents certain coincidences with Schaub's:

Blood purity is reflected in the studied framework as an anti-Jewish racism operating based on conceptual elements such as contagion, impurity, heritage, and 'race' as a defect of lineage. These discursive principles, in everyday life, translated into a manipulable system that excluded or included according to the impurity or purity of the candidate fabricated by public voice. It was not excluded for religious belonging; it was excluded due to an origin from which it was feared immoral behavior might derive due to the impurity of blood, to the 'race' in the blood. With the turn to anti-Jewish racism, the following argument is sought to be rescued. It is racist because, based on imaginaries of the past, heritage, the body, and contagion, it excludes and makes inferior in operational terms, and anti-Jewish (not antisemitic) because its theological-Aristotelian foundation belongs to a tradition prior to modernity.

For historian José Manuel Nieto Soria, the statutes of blood purity were the materialization of the racism in anti-converso propaganda, which held that "the intrinsic wickedness of converts" was due to the Jewish blood running through their veins.

Anti-converso propaganda added an evident racist connotation to its arguments by rejecting converts for the stain that their Jewish origin represented, noting that it would irreparably affect their children, and the children of their children, reminding Old Christians who had established family relationships with New Christians that they had introduced the poison of Jewish blood into their families.

== See also ==
- Afrophobia
- Anti-Arab racism
- Anti-miscegenation laws
- Antisemitism in Christianity
- Antisemitism in Europe
- Antisemitism in Mexico
- Aryan certificate
- Geography of antisemitism
- Hispanic and Latino (ethnic categories)
- Hispanic eugenics
- History of antisemitism
- History of European Jews in the Middle Ages#Spain
- Index of racism-related articles
- Islamophobia
- Judaizers
- Malinchism
- Negrophobia
- Persecution of Jews
- Persecution of Muslims
- Racial antisemitism
- Racial discrimination
- Religious antisemitism
- Vaqueiros de alzada

== Bibliography ==
- Álvarez Chillida, Gonzalo (2002). El Antisemitismo en España. La imagen del judío (1812–2002) (in Spanish). Madrid: Marcial Pons. ISBN 978-84-95379-49-8.
- Caro Baroja, Julio (1978). Los judíos en la España Moderna y Contemporánea (in Spanish). Vol. 3 vols (2nd ed.). Madrid: Istmo.
- Castro, Américo. "Christian-Jewish Symbiosis" (in Spanish).
- Elliott, John H. (2006). Imperios del Mundo Atlántico. España y Gran Bretaña en América, 1492–1830 [Empires of the Atlantic World. Britain and Spain in America 1492-1830] (in Spanish). Madrid: Taurus. ISBN 84-306-0617-3.
- Greenwood Davydd, J. (1978). "Pureza de sangre y nobleza en el País Vasco y Castilla: conceptos naturistas, variedades del orden social y autonomía de la naturaleza". Ethnica: Revista de antropología (in Spanish) (14): 161–182. ISSN 0210-5608.
- Hering Torres, Max Sebastián (2003). "'Limpieza de sangre'. ¿Racismo en la Edad Moderna?". Tiempos Modernos: Revista Electrónica de Historia Moderna (in Spanish). 4 (9).
- Hering Torres, Max Sebastián (2007). "'Raza': variables históricas". Revista de estudios sociales (in Spanish) (26): 16–27.
- Hering Torres, Max Sebastián (2011). "La limpieza de sangre. Problemas de interpretación: acercamientos históricos y metodológicos". Historia crítica (in Spanish) (45): 32–55. doi:10.7440/histcrit45.2011.03. hdl:1992/28925.
- HERNÁNDEZ FRANCO, Juan (2011). Sangre limpia, sangre española. El debate de los estatutos de limpieza (siglos XV-XVII) (in Spanish). Madrid: Cátedra.
- Kamen, Henry (2011) [1999]. La Inquisición Española. Una revisión histórica (in Spanish) (3rd ed.). Barcelona: Crítica. ISBN 978-84-9892-198-4.
- Mendoza Alonso, C. (1986). Judío (in Spanish). San Sebastián: Auñamendi.
- Schaub, Jean-Frédéric (2014). "Qui a inventé les lois de pureté de sang?". L'Histoire (in French) (400): 38–41.
- Schaub, Jean-Frédéric; Sebastiani, Silvia (2022). "L'invention d'un système racial. Europe, XVe-XVIIIe siècle". L'Histoire (in French) (493): 30–38.
- Sicroff, A. A (1985) [1955]. Los Estatutos de Limpieza de Sangre. Controversias entre los siglos XV y XVII (in Spanish). Madrid: Taurus.
