= Teresa de Cartagena =

Spanish writer and mystic

Teresa de Cartegena
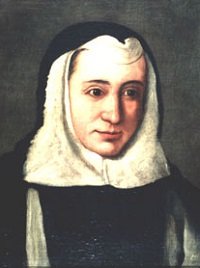
- Born: circa 1425
- Died: after 1478
- Relatives: Paul of Burgos (grandfather); Alonso de Cartagena (uncle)

Teresa de Cartagena (fl. 1425 – 1478) was a writer, mystic and nun in late medieval Castile who is considered to be the first Spanish-language female writer and mystic. She became deaf between 1453 and 1459. Her experience of deafness influenced her two known works Arboleda de los enfermos (Grove of the Infirm) and Admiraçión operum Dey (Wonder at the Works of God). The latter work represents what many critics consider as the first feminist tract written by a Spanish woman.

Few documents exist regarding Teresa's life. She was a conversa (a Christian of Jewish lineage). Her grandfather, Rabbi Shlomo ha-Levi, converted to Christianity around 1390 and was baptized as Pablo de Santa María, becoming bishop of Burgos in 1412. She was the niece of Alonso de Cartagena.

Cantera Burgos discovered that Teresa was the daughter of Pedro de Cartagena after finding her named in the will of a later bishop of Burgos, Alonso de Cartagena, Pedro's brother and Teresa's uncle. Before becoming deaf, Teresa entered the Franciscan Monasterio de Santa Clara in Burgos around 1440. Later, in 1449, for unspecified reasons she transferred to the Cistercian Abbey of Santa María la Real de Las Huelgas in Burgos at behest of her uncle. It was at this Cistercian monastery that she became deaf. Dayle Seidenspinner-Núñez and Yonsoo Kim argue that the transfer was prompted by family political strategy and the hostility of the Franciscans, who rejected conversos.

Teresa wrote her first work Arboleda de los enfermos expressing the solitude of her deafness. Approximately one to two years later, she penned a defense of her first work, called Admiraçión operum Dey, after mostly male critics claimed that a woman could not have possibly been the author of such an eloquent and well-reasoned work. Both of her writings have come down to modern readers through a single manuscript completed by the copyist Pero López del Trigo in 1481.

Important as Spain's first feminist writer, Teresa also contributed to an overall European canon of medieval feminist authors including Hildegard von Bingen and Christine de Pizan. Both Arboleda and Admiraçión are semi-autobiographical works that provide an authentic written voice of a medieval woman, a true rarity among surviving works of the Middle Ages.

She died after 1478.

== Arboleda de los enfermos ==
Teresa's first work examines the effect of her deafness on her life and its spiritual development. After being devastated by the initial onset of the illness, Teresa meditates in the silent prison of her deafness and ultimately concludes that God has afflicted her in order to separate her from the distractions of everyday noise. After much reflection in the prison of echoing sounds within the cloisters of her ears, Teresa reasons that her soul would have been purer if she had never been exposed to speech at all, which makes one turn to the outside material world and forget the inner spiritual world.

The copyist, Pero López, indicates that her work was addressed to Juana de Mendoza, wife of Gómez Manrique, a poet and prominent political figure of the time, but within Arboleda, she addresses a "virtuosa señora" (virtuous lady), who may be Juana de Mendoza, suggesting a female audience at large. In contrast, the genre Teresa employs, the libro de consolaciones (book of consolations), was primarily authored by men and addressed a male audience. In order to humble herself strategically before male readers, the author reiterates the weakness of her intellect or "la baxeza e grosería de mi mugeril yngenio" [the lowliness and grossness of my womanly intellect].

== Admiraçión operum Dey ==
Despite her strategies to disarm the male reader in Arboleda, men still rejected Teresa's work as plagiarized. In response to this male criticism, she composes Admiraçión operum Dey, making the argument that if God created men who could write, he could just as well have created women who could write, and while men have been writing for centuries, it does not make it any more natural for them to write but rather it seems natural because men have been writing for such a long time. In addition, simply because women have not traditionally written like men, it does not mean that female writing is any less natural.

Cleverly, Teresa argues that if God bestows a gift upon men then he can just as well bestow the same gift upon women. The following passage illustrates how Teresa viewed her relationship with God and the authorship of her writing:

People marvel at what I wrote in the treatise and I marvel at what, in fact, I kept quiet, but I do not marvel doubting nor do I insist on my wonder. For my experience makes me sure, and the God of Truth knows that I had no other master nor consulted with any other learned authority nor translated from other books, as some people with malicious wonder are wont to say. Rather, this alone is the truth: that God of all knowledge, Lord of all virtues, Father of mercy, God of every consolation, He who consoles us in all our tribulation, He alone consoled me, He alone taught me, He alone read (to) me. He inclined His ear to me when I, besieged with great anguish and adrift in a deep sea of misfortunes, called upon Him with the Prophet, saying, “Save me, O God: for the waters are come in even unto my soul” [Psalm 68:2]. (Translation from Seidenspinner-Núñez, 102-3)

Ultimately, Teresa concludes that the criticisms of her opponents call into question God's authority to distribute gifts and consequently offends him. The "virtuosa señora" addressed in the second work as in the first acts as the female addressee or reader who sympathizes with Teresa's concerns. To illustrate her points further, the author makes use of imagery and allusions to Biblical women. For example, she alludes to the Biblical story of the powerful Judith, who kills Holofernes after a whole army of men could not perform the task. Teresa also expounds upon the virtue of the interior life of the housewife.

According to Teresa, the tranquil and spiritual interior world of the household, in contrast to the exterior warring world of men, constitutes a place for reflection and intellectual growth. While strategically noting that men and women are not equal in all capacities, Teresa also remarks that masculine and feminine roles complement each other because of their differences.

== Editions ==
- Cartagena, Teresa de. Arboleda de los enfermos. Admiración operum Dey. Ed. Lewis Joseph Hutton. Anejo 16 del Boletín de la Real Academia Española. Madrid: Real Academia Española, 1967.
- Cartagena, Teresa de. The Writings of Teresa de Cartagena: Translated with Introduction, Notes, and Interpretive Essay. Trans. Dayle Seidenspinner-Núñez. Cambridge: D.S. Brewer, 1998.
- Castro Ponce, Clara Esther. "Teresa de Cartagena. Arboleda de Los Enfermos. Admiraçión Operum Dey. Edición Crítica Singular." Diss. Brown U, 2001.
- Gallego Fdez. de Aránguiz, Myriam: Teresa de Cartagena. Los tratados de una escritora burgalesa del siglo XV. Introducción y edición modernizada de Arboleda de los enfermos y Admiración de las obras de Dios, Burgos, Monte Carmelo, 2020, ISBN 978-84-18303-38-8.
- Baury, Ghislain: Thérèse de Carthagène : Bosquet des malades. Admiration des œuvres de Dieu. Paroles et silence d'une femme dans la Castille du XVe siècle, París, e-Spania Books, 2021, ISBN 9782919448418, read online.
