= John W. O'Malley =

American academic, Catholic historian, and Jesuit priest (1927–2022)

The Reverend John W. O'Malley SJ
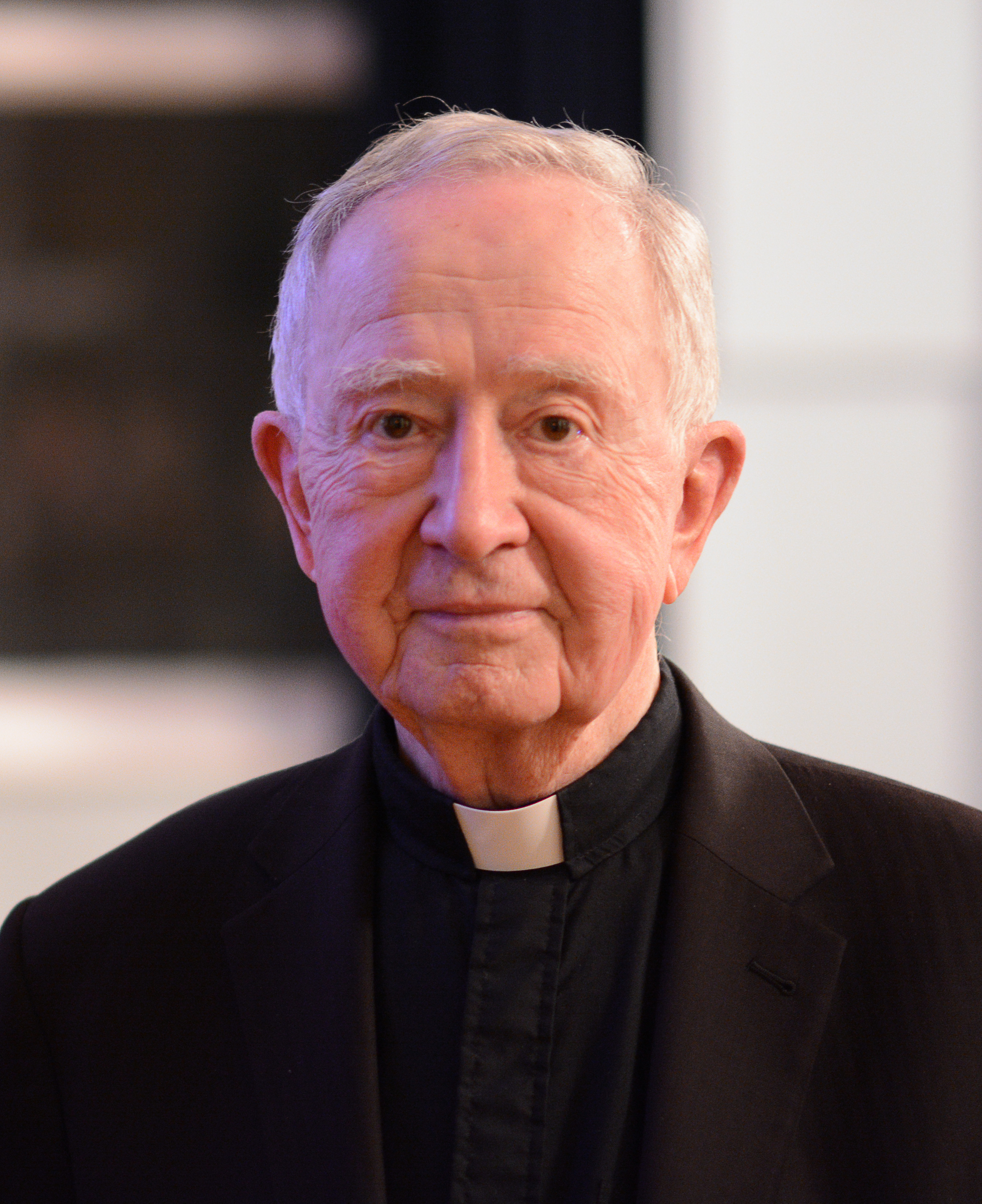
- O'Malley in 2015
- Born: June 11, 1927; Tiltonsville, Ohio, U.S.
- Died: September 11, 2022 (aged 95); Baltimore, Maryland, U.S.
- Education: Harvard University (PhD, 1966)
- Occupations: Author, professor, historian
- Employer: Georgetown University
- Awards: Henry Allen Moe Prize (2013)

John William O'Malley SJ (June 11, 1927 – September 11, 2022) was an American academic, Catholic historian, and Jesuit priest. He was a university professor at Georgetown University, housed in the Department of Theology and Religious Studies. O'Malley was a widely published expert on the religious history of Early Modern Europe, with specialities on the Council of Trent, the Second Vatican Council, and the First Vatican Council.

== Personal life ==
O'Malley was born in Tiltonsville, Ohio, in 1927. At age 18, he joined the Society of Jesus, and later earned a PhD in history from Harvard University. He died at age 95 on September 11, 2022, and is buried in the Jesuit Cemetery on the campus of Georgetown University.

== Career ==
He was a member of the faculty at the University of Detroit from 1965 and of the Weston Jesuit School of Theology at Cambridge, Massachusetts from 1979, before becoming a professor at Georgetown University with the rank of University Professor.

Among O'Malley's best-known works are The First Jesuits (Harvard University Press, 1993), translated into 12 languages, and What Happened at Vatican II (Harvard University Press, 2008), as well as The Jesuits. A History from Ignatius to the Present (Rowman and Littlefield Publishers, Lanham 2014).

== Awards and honors ==
O'Malley has received numerous awards in the field of Catholic history, religious culture, and theology. He was awarded Harvard University's Graduate School of Arts Centennial Medal. He has served as president of both the Renaissance Society of America and the American Catholic Historical Association. He was elected in 1995 to the American Academy of Arts and Sciences, in 1997 to the American Philosophical Society and in 2001 to the Accademia di San Carlo, Ambrosian Library, (Milan). He received the Johannes Quasten Medal from the Catholic University of America. In 2002 he was awarded the Society of Italian Historical Studies Grand Prize and in 2005 the Renaissance Society of America. He was awarded the 2014 John Gilmary Shea Prize for Trent: What Happened at the Council.

== Bibliography ==
O'Malley has authored the following books:

- Giles of Viterbo on Church and Reform: A Study in Renaissance Thought, E.J. Brill (Leiden, Netherlands), 1968.
- Praise and Blame in Renaissance Rome: Rhetoric, Doctrine, and Reform in the Sacred Orators of the Papal Court, c. 1450 – 1521, Duke University Press (Durham, NC), 1979.
- Rome and the Renaissance: Studies in Culture and Religion, Variorum Reprints (London, England), 1981.
- Tradition and Transition: Historical Perspectives on Vatican II, M. Glazier (Wilmington, DE), 1989.
- The First Jesuits, Harvard University Press (Cambridge, MA), 1993.
- Religious Culture in the Sixteenth Century: Preaching, Rhetoric, Spirituality, and Reform, Variorum Reprints (Brookfield, VT), 1993.
- Trent and All That: Renaming Catholicism in the Early Modern Era, Harvard University Press (Cambridge, MA), 2000.
- Four Cultures of the West, Belknap Press of Harvard University Press (Cambridge, MA), 2004.
- What Happened at Vatican II, Harvard University Press (Cambridge, MA), 2008.
- A History of the Popes: From Peter to the Present, Sheed & Ward (London, England), 2009.
- Trent: What Happened at the Council, Harvard University Press (Cambridge, MA), 2013.
- The Jesuits: A History from Ignatius to the Present, Rowman & Littlefield (Lanham, MD), 2014.
- Catholic History for Today's Church: How Our Past Illuminates Our Present, Rowman & Littlefield (Lanham, MD), 2015.
- The Jesuits and the Popes: A Historical Sketch of Their Relationship, Saint Joseph's University Press (Philadelphia, PA), 2016.
- Vatican I: The Council and the Making of the Ultramontane Church, Harvard University Press (Cambridge, MA), 2018.
- When Bishops Meet: An Essay Comparing Trent, Vatican I, and Vatican II, Harvard University Press (Cambridge, MA), 2019.
- The Education of a Historian: A Strange and Wonderful Story, St. Joseph's University Press (Philadelphia, PA), 2021.

He has also edited a number of volumes including:

- (Editor, with Lucien Richard and Daniel T. Harrington) Vatican II, the Unfinished Agenda: A Look to the Future, Paulist Press (New York, NY), 1987.
- (Editor) Catholicism in Early Modern History: A Guide to Research, Center for Reformation Research (St. Louis, MO), 1988.
- (Editor, with Louis A. Perraud) Desiderius Erasmus, Spiritualia, University of Toronto Press (Toronto, Ontario, Canada), 1988.
- (Editor, with John W. Padberg and Vincent T. O'Keefe) Jesuit Spirituality: A Now and Future Resource, Loyola University Press (Chicago, IL), 1990.
- (Editor, with Thomas M. Izbicki and Gerald Christianson) Humanity and Divinity in Renaissance and Reformation: Essays in Honor of Charles Trinkaus, E.J. Brill (New York, NY), 1993.
- (Editor, with others) The Jesuits: Cultures, Sciences, and the Arts, 1540-1773, University of Toronto Press (Toronto, Ontario, Canada), 1999.
- (Editor, with Gauvin Alexander Bailey) The Jesuits and the Arts: 1540-1773, Saint Joseph's University Press (Philadelphia, PA), 2005.
- (Editor) The Jesuits II: Cultures, Sciences, and the Arts, 1540-1773, University of Toronto Press (Buffalo, NY), 2006.

== See also ==
- Hermeneutics of the Second Vatican Council
