= Álvar García de Santa María =

Spanish historian and Roman Catholic convert

Álvar García de Santa María (1370 – March 21, 1460) was a Spanish historian and Jewish convert to Roman Catholicism during the late Middle Ages. He was born in 1370 into a prominent Castilian Jewish family, but converted in 1390 at the time of evangelization of the Jewish community by St. Vincent Ferrer. His brother Pablo de Santa María also converted and later became Bishop of Burgos, as did Álvar's nephew Alphonso de Cartagena, another Jewish convert.

Álvar later became a senior court historian and chronicler of the reign of King John II of Castile, probably compiling the Crónica de Juan II (or Chronicle of John II). He has also been put forward as the potential author of the book Crónica de don Álvaro de Luna written in the 1450s, the authorship of which is in dispute. Álvar died on March 21, 1460, at a great age.
