= Gerónimo de Santa Fe =

Spanish physician and writer (fl. 1400–1430)

Jerónimo de Santa Fe (fl. 1400–1430; born Yehosúa ben Yosef) was a Spanish physician and religious writer who, after conversion to Catholicism from Judaism, wrote in Latin as Hieronymus de Sancta Fide (Jerome of the Holy Faith).

Born Yehosúa ben Yosef, his epithet "al-Lorquí", from Lorca, near Murcia, may indicate his place of birth or later residence. An alternative hypothesis places his hometown as Alcañiz.

According to Richard Gottheil (1911) it is not correct to identify him with the author of the same name who wrote an anti-Christian letter to Solomon ha-Levi (Paul de Burgos). The only proof offered for such an identification is a note appended to the manuscript of the letter to the effect that "the author afterward became a Christian". This note, not in another manuscript ("Cat. Leyden", pp. 276, 354), was probably added by a later copyist who was misled by the similarity of the names (see Joshua ben Joseph ibn Vives al-Lorqui). Joshua ha-Lorki was baptized before Vicente Ferrer delivered his proselytizing sermons in Lorca. Although not a rabbi, as Spanish chroniclers claim, he was well versed in the Talmud and in rabbinical literature. In order to show his zeal for the new faith he tried to win over to Christianity his former co-believers, and to throw suspicion on them and on their religion. For that reason he was called "megaddef" ("the blasphemer"), from the initial letters of his name, Maestro Geronimo de Santa Fé. He offered to prove from the Talmud that the Messiah had already come in the person of Jesus. For this purpose he induced Antipope Benedict XIII, whose physician he was, to arrange the Disputation of Tortosa with learned Jews. Either before or after the debate Hieronymus, at the request of Pope Benedict XIII, wrote two articles in which he heaped up accusations against the Jews and repeated old, apparently slanderous charges. One of these articles was Tractatus Contra Perfidiam Judæorum; the other, De Judæis Erroribus ex Talmuth; they were published together as Hebræomastix (Zurich, 1552; Frankfurt am Main, 1602; Hamburg, n. d.), printed in the Bibliotheca Magna Veterum Patrum, Lyons, vol. xxvi., and Cologne, 1618; they were also translated into Castilian under the title Azote de los Hebreos. Articles in response were written by Don Vidal Benveniste, with the title "Ḳodesh ha-Ḳodashim", and by Isaac Nathan ben Kalonymus in his "Tokaḥat Mat'eh".

Hieronymus had several sons. One of them, Pedro, was in special favor with Queen Maria. Another was assessor for the governor of Aragon and lived in Saragossa; this son of the "apostle of Tortosa", as De los Rios calls him ("Hist." iii. 264), took part in the assassination of Pedro de Arbués, was arrested with other Marranos, and, in order to escape the disgrace of being publicly burned, killed himself in prison. His body was burned publicly on October 21–22, 1486. Other members of the Santa Fe family were burned as marranos in 1497 and 1499.

== Works ==
- "De iudaicis erroribus ex Talmut"
