= Paul of Burgos =

Spanish archbishop (c.1351–1435)

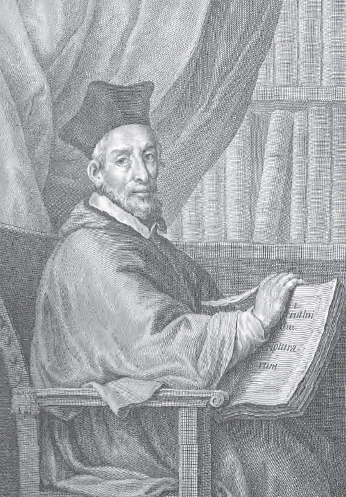
Pablo de Santa María

Paul of Burgos (Burgos, c. 1351 – 29 August 1435) was a Spanish Jew who converted to Christianity, and became an archbishop, lord chancellor, and exegete. He is known also as Pablo de Santa María. His original name was Solomon ha-Levi.

== Early life ==
His father, Isaac ha-Levi, had come from Aragon to Burgos in the middle of the 14th century.

According to Graetz, his scholarship, intelligence, and piety were praised by Isaac ben Sheshet Perfet, with whom he corresponded. This assertion is disputed by Atlas and Hershman as anachronistic; "...the disparity in age between Paul de Burgos and Perfet renders the assumption of Graetz untenable."

== Conversion ==
He received Christian baptism on 21 July 1391 in Burgos, taking the name Paul de Santa María. French historian Leon Poliakov writes that he converted in the aftermath of the great wave of massacres of Jews which began on 6 June 1391. Paul himself attributed his conversion to the works of Thomas Aquinas. The official Catholic Church records show that he had converted to Christianity a year earlier (at 21 July 1390), and studies attribute this record to Paul himself, who wanted to show that it wasn't the pressure of the massacres that motivated his baptism.

== Controversy ==
Following his conversion, Paul, and later his younger colleague and fellow convert Joshua ha-Lorki (Gerónimo de Santa Fe), took an active role in proselytizing Spanish Jews. Kenneth Levin has stated that when a wave of forced conversions of Jews to Christianity began in 1411, Paul "took a leading role in the assault on Spain’s remaining Jews and was responsible for drawing up edicts that isolated the Jews, stripped them of many communal rights, and, most importantly, deprived them of almost all means of earning a living, leaving them with the choice of death by privation for themselves and their families or conversion." Jewish historians have suggested that Paul converted for social and economic (as opposed to religious) reasons following a wave of anti-Jewish violence and forced conversions throughout Spain in 1391.

== Later life ==
Paul spent some years at the University of Paris, receiving the degree of doctor of theology after several years. He then visited London, where he probably remained only a short time, sending a Hebrew satire on Purim to Don Meïr Alguades from that city.

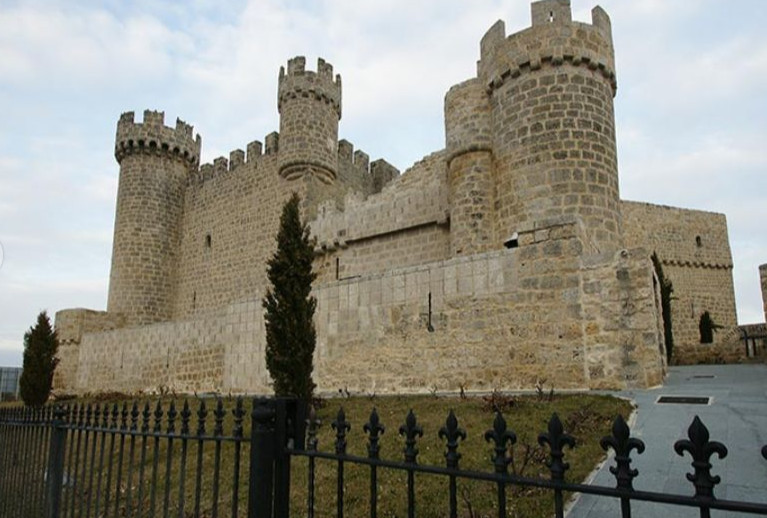
The Castle of Olmillos de Sasamón, known as "The Castle of the Fleur de Lis", built by his son Pedro de Cartagena in 1446

He was appointed archdeacon of Treviño, and in 1402 (or 1405) became Bishop of Cartagena; and in 1415, Archbishop of Burgos. He was succeeded in the see of Burgos by his second son, Archbishop Alfonso of Burgos, known as Alfonso de Cartagena.

In 1406 Henry III of Castile appointed him keeper of the royal seal. In 1416 Henry named him chancellor. After Henry's death Paul was a member of the council which ruled Castile in the name of the regent Doña Catalina, and by the will of the deceased king he was tutor to the heir to the throne, the later John II of Castile. He died on August 30, 1435.

== Relationship to Judaism ==
Paul, who even after he had been baptized continued to correspond with several Jews, including Joseph Orabuena, chief rabbi of Navarre, and Joshua ibn Vives, became a strong proponent of conversion from Judaism.

== Works ==
The published writings of Archbishop Paul were:

- Dialogus Pauli et Sauli contra Judæos, sive Scrutinium scripturarum (Mantua, 1475; Mains, 1478; Paris, 1507, 1535; Burgos, 1591).
- Additiones to the Postilla of Nicholas of Lyra (Nuremberg, 1481; 1485; 1487, etc.; Venice, 1481, 1482, etc.).

It is chiefly on the latter work that Paul's reputation as an exegete rests. The Additiones were originally mere marginal notes written in a volume of the Postilla which he sent to his son Alonso. Their publication aroused Matthias Döring, the provincial of the Saxon Franciscans, to publish his Replicæ, a bitter rejection of almost half of the 1,100 suggestions and additions Paul had made.

- De nomine divino quæstiones duodecim (Utrecht, 1707).

These tracts are excerpts from the Additiones in regard to Exodus iii, and are joined to the scholia of J. Drusius on the correct pronunciation of the name of Jehovah.

== See also ==
- Alfonso de Cartagena
- Álvar García de Santa María
- Gonzalo de Santa María
- Teresa de Cartagena
- Francisco de Vitoria
- Isabel Osorio
