= Fernán Díaz de Toledo =

Spanish royal secretary and relator (1385–1457)

- Born: Mose Hamomo c. 1385; Alcalá de Henares, Kingdom of Castile
- Died: 2 May 1457 (aged 71–72); Burgos, Kingdom of Castile
- Education: Estudio de Valladolid
- Occupations: royal secretary; oidor; relator; scribe; notary; referendary
- Notable work: Instrucción del Relator para el obispo de Cuenca a favor de la nación hebrea

Fernán Díaz de Toledo (born Mose Hamomo; c. 1385 – 2 May 1457) was a Spanish canon lawyer who held numerous important roles in the Spanish government, including royal secretary, oidor, and relator. Díaz most likely converted from Judaism to Christianity as a child in 1391 before studying canon law at the Estudio de Valladolid. Owing to his legal background, hard work, and political connections, Díaz was appointed to numerous political positions during his career. These positions put him in close contact with the Kings Juan II and Enrique IV as well as the Royal Council. The historian María Josefa Sanz Fuentes described him as "probably the most powerful man at the court of King Juan II of Castille", while the medieval historian José Luis Bermejo Cabrero wrote that "nobody among the secretaries of the Middle Ages could reach such a level of influence over kings".

== Early life ==
Fernán Díaz de Toledo was born Mose Hamomo (Note: He was also known by the name Fernando. Alternate versions of his birth name include Moses Hamamo and Mosés Hamomo.) in Alcalá de Henares circa 1385. His mother was named María de Toledo and his father, from whom he received his Jewish ancestry, was named Pedro Díaz. He had at least one brother, Pedro, who similarly became a doctor in law. Fernán Díaz most likely converted from Judaism to Christianity as a child in 1391. After studying canon law at the Estudio de Valladolid, Díaz received in 1424 papal approval to attain a doctorate in law and decretals.

At an unknown date, Díaz married Aldonza Gonzalez, a Christian widow who had previously borne three children. They had two children together: Luis Díaz de Toledo, who studied law at the Universities of Salamanca and Valladolid, and Juana Díaz de Toledo. Additionally, he had three illegitimate children. The first was named María and was borne to an unknown mother, while the other two, María de Toledo and Pedro de Toledo, were both mothered by Juana de Ovalle. His nephew, Pero Díaz de Toledo, became an oidor in the Audiencia, a role that he also held during his career.

== Career ==
Owing to his legal background, hard work, and political connections, Díaz was appointed to numerous political positions during his career. According to the chronicler Álvar García de Santa María, Díaz was capable of completing more work in one hour than could any other official in four days. The historian Gonzalo Chacón, a contemporary of Díaz, referred to him as "a very sharp man of subtle wit". (Note: Original: "un hombre muy agudo e de sotil ingenio".) By 1423, Díaz had risen to serve Juan II, King of Castile, as the royal secretary, oidor, and relator; he was often referred to simply as "el Relator" in reference to this ultimate position. He also served as a scribe, referendary, notary, and member of the Royal Council, and frequently traveled with Juan II as a member of his retinue.

In his capacity as oidor, Díaz worked as a sort of traveling judge, sent by the King to resolve "especially grave judicial conflicts". (Note: Original: "conflictos jurídicos de especial gravedad".) One example of such a case was that which stripped the Count of Castro of all of his possessions, a sentence that was read by Díaz. As an oidor, he was also responsible for carrying out official inquiries on behalf of the Crown. The position of relator required him to serve as the link between Juan II and the Royal Council as well as to compile and report legal occurrences of note directly to the King. He was also responsible for presenting petitions to the Royal Council. This role placed him very close to the King; in fact, the historian María Josefa Sanz Fuentes described him as "probably the most powerful man at the court of King Juan II of Castille" and "a key person in mid-15th century Castilian history". Furthermore, the medieval historian José Luis Bermejo Cabrero wrote that "nobody among the secretaries of the Middle Ages could reach such a level of influence over kings". (Note: Original: "nadie, entre los secretarios de la Edad Media, pudo alcanzar tal grado de influencia ante los reyes".)

Díaz served Juan II and, later, Enrique IV for nearly half a century, during which time he addressed and resolved royal matters relating to the administration of justice, documentary and notarial issues, and even the personal lives of the kings. At times, Díaz was also dispatched in the King's stead in order to settle diplomatic disputes; for example, there are numerous cases of him being sent to convince local alcaldes to surrender their castles to the Crown when the King demanded control of their holdings.

=== Instrucción del Relator ===
In 1449, Old Christians in Toledo rebelled, upset by the perceived insidious intrusion of Judaizers in Spain's religious institutions and government. That year, they enacted a municipal statute banning conversos (recent Jewish converts to Christianity) from holding office of any kind in the city due to their "heresies and other offences, insults, seditions and crimes committed and perpetrated". Given his importance and stature, Díaz was an especial target of Toledo's Old Christians, who accused him of heresy.

In response to the campaign against conversos, Díaz penned a dossier directed to the Bishop of Cuenca, Lope de Barrientos, at some point between 15 October and 17 November 1449. Díaz's intent with the dossier, entitled the Instrucción del Relator para el obispo de Cuenca a favor de la nación hebrea (Instruction from the Relator for the Bishop of Cuenca in Favor of the Hebrew Nation), was to garner support for conversos from Barrientos and Enrique IV, who at that time was crown prince; it also circulated more widely among the public. In the Instrucción, Díaz defended converts by highlighting the fact that Christianity developed from Judaism and that the Jews were God's original chosen people. He also argued that all Christians were equals after their initiation through baptism and noted that a majority of Spain's nobility had some Jewish ancestry. By the end of that November, Enrique entered Toledo to quell the rebellion and execute its principal actors. The Instrucción has been the subject of scholarly attention in the modern era.

== Death and will ==
Díaz died on 2 May 1457 in Burgos. He had made out his will two years prior after falling seriously ill in Almazán. His will, dated 16 February 1455, dictated that he be buried with his mother the Church of Santa María la Mayor's chapel located in Alcalá de Henares, his birth city. He himself had ordered the construction of the chapel, which in modern times has been reconstructed and is now called the Chapel of the Oidor. He bequeathed the majority of his property and assets to his son Luis.

== Bibliography ==
- Amrán, Rica (2013). "Los conversos Juan Ramírez de Lucena y Alfonso de Santa Cruz: puntos de encuentro y desencuentro con otros cristianos nuevos (siglos XV al XVI)". In Fine, Ruth; Guillemont, Michèle; Vila, Juan Diego (eds.). Lo converso: Orden imaginario y realidad en la cultura española (siglos XIV–XVII) [Converts: Imagined Order and Reality in Spanish Culture (14th–17th Centuries)] (in Spanish). Iberoamericana Vervuert. pp. 93–117. doi:10.31819/9783954870806-005. ISBN 9783954870806.
- Bermejo Cabrero, José Luis (9 December 1979). "Los primeros secretarios de los reyes" [The Kings' First Secretaries]. Anuario de Historia del Derecho Español (in Spanish). 49. Ministerio de Justicia: 186–296. ISSN 2659-8981.
- Cañas Gálvez, Francisco de Paula (December 2009). "La itinerancia de la corte de Castilla durante la primera mitad del siglo XV" [The Itinerancy of the Court of Castille during the First Half of the 15th Century]. E-Spania (in Spanish). 8 (8). doi:10.4000/e-spania.18829. ISSN 1951-6169.
- Díaz Martín, José Manuel (5 December 2018). "Una nueva mirada sobre el Defensorium de Alonso de Cartagena. Del debate nobiliario castellano al retorno de los judíos conversos" [A New Look at the Alonso de Cartagena's Defensorium: On the Castilian Nobility's Debate on the Return of the Jewish Conversos]. Hispanic Research Journal (in Spanish). 19 (4). Taylor & Francis: 327–344. doi:10.1080/14682737.2018.1492542. ISSN 1745-820X.
- Gutwirth, Eleazar (1986). "Dyl'twr o ryl'twr: Fernán Díaz de Toledo y los judíos" [Dyl'twr or ryl'twr: Fernán Díaz de Toledo and the Jews]. Sefarad (in Spanish). 46 (1). Consejo Superior de Investigaciones Científicas: 229–234. ISSN 0037-0894.
- Ingram, Kevin (7 December 2018). Converso Non-Conformism in Early Modern Spain. Palgrave Macmillan. doi:10.1007/978-3-319-93236-1_2. ISBN 9783319932361.
- Ostos-Salcedo, Pilar (September 2012). "Las "Notas del Relator": Un formulario castellano del siglo XV". In Guyotjeannin, Olivier; Morelle, Laurent; Scalfati, Silio P. (eds.). Compilation et circulation des modèles d'actes dans l'Europe médiévale et moderne [Compilation and Circulation of Examples of Acts from Medieval and Modern Europe] (in Spanish). École nationale des chartes. pp. 189–209.
- Round, Nicholas G. (October 1969). "Five Magicians, or the Uses of Literacy". Modern Language Review. 64 (4). Modern Humanities Research Association: 793–805. doi:10.2307/3723921. JSTOR 3723921.
- Round, Nicholas G. (October 1969). "Politics, Style and Group Attitudes in the Instrucción del Relator". Bulletin of Hispanic Studies. 46 (4). Liverpool University Press: 289–319. doi:10.3828/bhs.46.4.289. ISSN 1478-3398.
- Round, Nicholas G. (1992). "Alonso de Espina y Pero Díaz de Toledo: Odium Theologicum y Odium Academicum". Actas del X Congreso de la Asociación Internacional de Hispanistas [Acts of the 10th Congress of the International Association of Hispanists] (PDF) (in Spanish). Promociones y Publicaciones Universitarias. pp. 319–329.
- Salvá, Miguel; Sainz de Baranda, Pedro (1848). Colección de documentos inéditos para la historia de España [Collection of Unpublished Documents for the History of Spain] (in Spanish). Vol. 13. La Viuda de Calero.
- Sanz Fuentes, María Josefa (2014). "El testamento de Fernán Díaz de Toledo, el Relator (1455)" [The Testament of Fernán Díaz de Toledo, el Relator (1455)] (PDF). Historia, Instituciones, Documentos (in Spanish). 41 (41). Editorial Universidad de Sevilla: 381–406. doi:10.12795/hid.2014.i41.12. ISSN 2253-8291.
- Soyer, François (20 February 2019). Antisemitic Conspiracy Theories in the Early Modern Iberian World. Brill. doi:10.1163/9789004395602_005. ISBN 9789004395602.
- Yisraeli, Yosi; Israeli, Yanay (July 2022). "Defining "Conversos" in Fifteenth-Century Castile: The Making of a Controversial Category". Speculum. 97 (3). University of Chicago Press: 609–648. doi:10.1086/720233. ISSN 2040-8072.
