= John Padberg =

American Jesuit academic

John W. Padberg (May 22, 1926 - 2021) was an American Jesuit academic. He was president of the Weston School of Theology from 1975 to 1985. He was the founding president of the International Conference of Catholic Theological Institutions, from 1986 to 2002 the editor of Studies in the Spirituality of Jesuits, and the founding chairman of the National Seminar on Jesuit Higher Education and editor of its journal, Conversations on Jesuit Higher Education.

== Books ==
- Colleges in Controversy: The Jesuit Schools in France from Revival to Suppression, 1814-1880 (Harvard University Press, 1969)
- Together as a Companionship: A History of the Thirty-First through Thirty-Third General Congregations of the Society of Jesus (The Institute of Jesuit Sources, 1994)
- with Martin D. O'Keefe and John L. McCarthy For Matters of Greater Moment: a History and Translation of the Decrees of the First Thirty Jesuit General Congregations, 1558-1957 (The Institute of Jesuit Sources, 1994)
