= Alfonso de Cartagena =

Converso bishop, diplomat, historian, and writer (1384–1456)

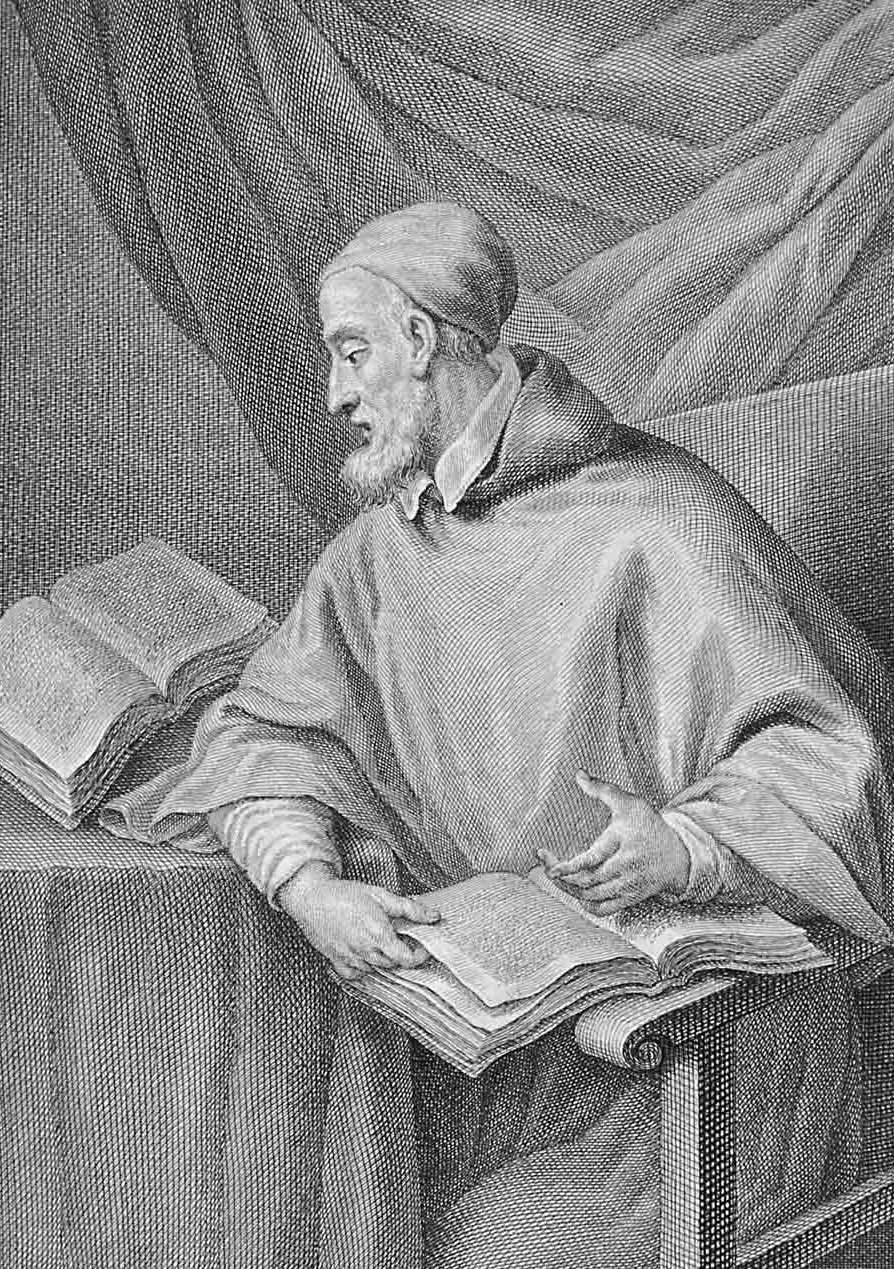
Alfonso de Cartagena.

Alfonso de Santa María de Cartagena (variants: Alfonso de Carthagena, Alonso de Cartagena; 1384 in Burgos – 1456 in Villasandino) was a Jewish convert to Christianity, a Roman Catholic bishop, diplomat, historian and writer of Renaissance Spain.

== Biography ==
Alfonso de Cartagena was the second son of Rabbi Paul of Burgos, who converted from Judaism to Christianity in 1390. At the same time, Alfonso and his four brothers, one sister and two uncles were baptized. His mother, however, was not. Cartagena studied law in Salamanca, and "was a great lawyer in canon and civil law", according to Claros varones de Castilla (1486). He served as dean of Santiago de Compostela and Segovia, later becoming apostolic nuncio and canon of Burgos (1421).

He was equally distinguished as statesman and as priest. In 1434 he was named by King John II de Trastámara (1405–54) as the representative of Castile at the Council of Basel, succeeding Cardinal Alonso de Carrillo. There he composed a famous discourse in Latin and Castilian (Propositio... super altercatione praeminentia, 1434), calling on the council to recognize the superior right of the King of Castile over the King of England.

The humanist Enea Silvio Piccolomini, who became Pope Pius II, in his memoirs called Cartagena "an ornament to the prelacy". Pope Eugenius IV thanked him for his services by making him bishop of Burgos when his father died (1435). Eugenius, learning that the bishop of Burgos was about to visit Rome, declared in full conclave that "in the presence of such a man he felt ashamed to be seated in St. Peter's chair".

After living in Rome for some time, dedicated to study, Cartagena returned to Burgos, where he founded a public school "of all doctrine", in which the most advanced Latinists of the Spain of the Catholic Monarchs studied. These included Rodrigo Sánchez de Arévalo, Alfonso de Palencia, Diego Rodríguez Almela and perhaps Fernán Díaz de Toledo. Cartagena was a friend of fellow writer and humanist Fernán Pérez de Guzmán (1378–1460), nephew of Pero López de Ayala and señor de Batres, who included an affectionate biographical outline in his Generaciones y semblanzas (1450). Cartagena dedicated his Oracional (1454), a treatise on prayer, to him.

Cartagena went to Portugal as an emissary of King John II, where he negotiated peace. He was also emissary to the kings of Germany and Poland and intervened in the conflicts of Castile with Aragon and Granada.

He helped with a large sum to build the monastery of San Pablo of Burgos and rebuilt other churches and monasteries of his see, among them the Cathedral of Burgos, whose construction had been interrupted a considerable time before.

In 1422 he undertook the translation of some works of Cicero (De officiis, De senectute), ordered by the secretary of King John II, Juan Alfonso de Zamora. He also translated Cicero's De inventione, for use by then Prince Duarte of Portugal. His translations into the vernacular followed a clear humanistic intent, that of teaching the wisdom of the classics to gentlemen interested in the works, but not scholars themselves. For the same reason, but also for another reason (his inclination to Stoicism), he translated the Treatises and Tragedies of Seneca the Younger. He disputed with the humanist Leonardo Bruni of Arezzo or Aretino (1370–1444) over a new translation by Bruni of the Ethics of Aristotle. The conflict became extended in scope when Pietro Candido Decembrio (1399–1477) came to the defense of Bruni, and Cardinal Pizolpasso (1370–1443) also became involved. At least six texts and 19 letters related to the dispute passed between Cartagena and Decembrio, including Cartagena's Declinations.

Heinrich Graetz ascribes to the influence exercised by Carthagena over Eugenius IV the latter's sudden change of attitude toward the Jews. Carthagena alone, says Graetz, could have been the author of the complaints against the pride and arrogance of the Castilian Jews, which induced the pope to issue the bull of 1442, withdrawing the privileges granted to them by former popes.

He wrote besides some treatises on moral philosophy and theology. At the age of 60 he went on pilgrimage to Santiago de Compostela, but died on the return to his diocese.

== Works ==
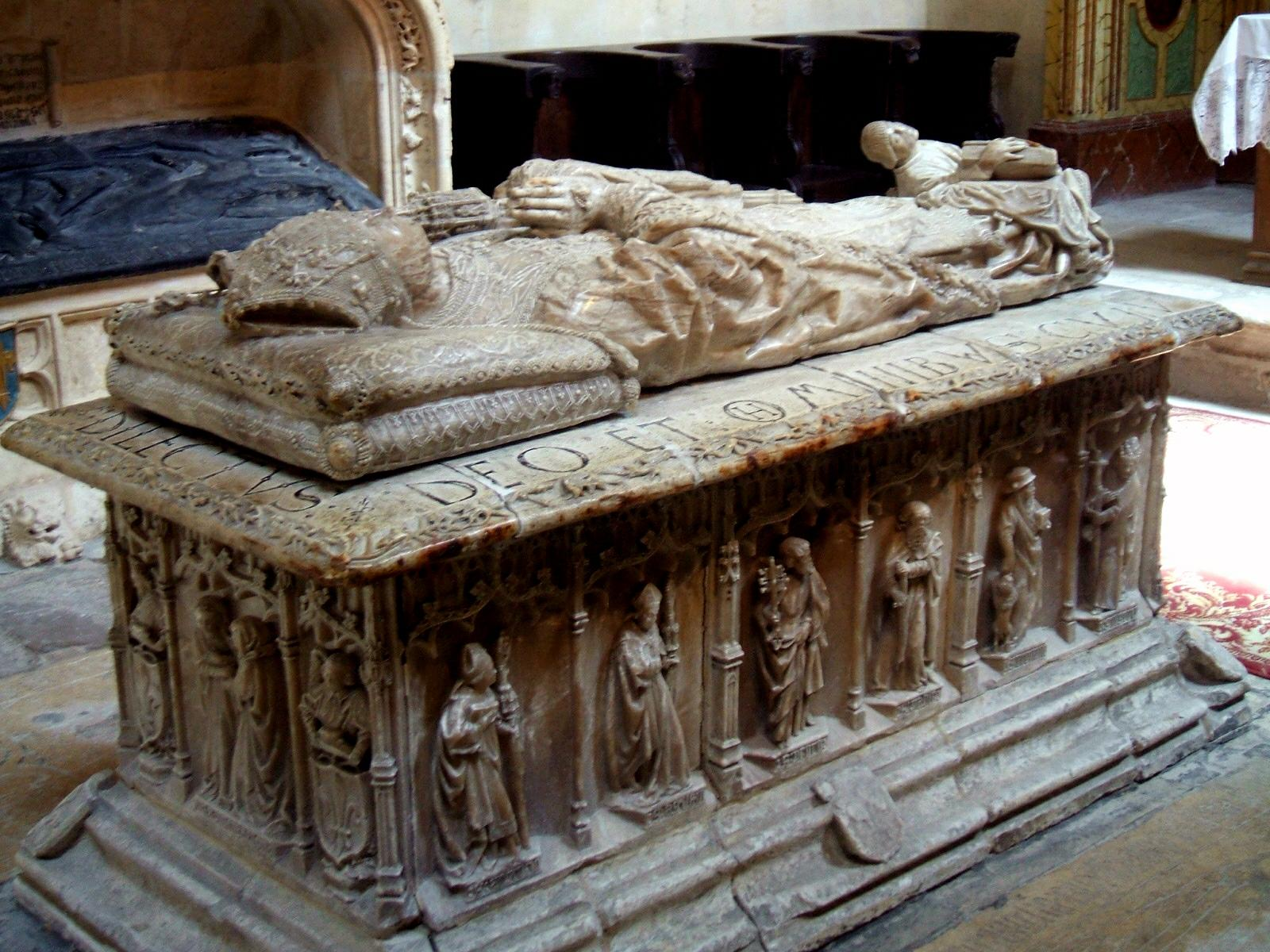
Sepulcher of Alfonso de Cartagena in the Chapel of the Visitation of the Cathedral of Burgos

Besides his translations of twelve books of Seneca, in which he was particularly interested, and of the works of Cicero mentioned above, he wrote Rerum in Hispania gestarum Chronicon. Around 1456 he wrote a history of Spain based on Flavius Josephus, Florus and Jiménez de Rada and entitled Anacephaleosis that emphasized Castilian Gothicism. This was translated by Fernán Pérez de Guzmán and Juan de Villafuerte under the title Genealogía de los Reyes de España (Genealogy of the Kings of Spain) (1463). The translation was composed of a prologue and 94 chapters, of which seven contain a summary of the origins of the Spanish monarchy from Atalaric to the kings of Asturias and of Castile and León, and a genealogical tree showing their relationship to the monarchs of Navarre, Aragon and Portugal.

Among Carthagena's writings on history, morals, and other subjects, there is a commentary on the twenty-sixth Psalm, Judica me, Deus. Defensorium fidei, also called Defensorium unitatis christianae (1449–50), is a plea in defense of converted Jews. Oracional de Fernán Pérez (Burgos, 1487, written about 1454) is a treatise on a prayer edited around 1454 and addressed to his friend and confidant Fernán Pérez de Guzmán, in 55 chapters and an afterword on virtues and the Mass. He also wrote Doctrinal de Caballeros (Burgos, 1487, written around 1444), which consists of an adaptation of the second Partida of Alfonso X the Wise in four books covering faith, laws, war, rewards and punishments, revolts, challenges and duels, tournaments, vassals, bad actions and privileges.

Other works include Memoriales virtutum or Memorial de virtudes, various songs, aphorisms and compositions of love that appear dispersed in songbooks; Prefación a San Juan Crisóstomo, Allegationes... super conquista insularum Canariae (Allegations About the Conquest of the Canary Islands, 1437), which defends Castilian rights to the islands; Epistula... ad comitem de Haro (c. 1440), prescribing a program of readings to educate the nobility, among them the moral texts of Cato, and Contemptus mundanorum. He also wrote Duodenarium (1442), where he answers twelve questions of Pérez de Guzmán; Tractatus questionis ortolanus (1443–47), to Rodrigo Sánchez de Arévalo, in which he defends the superiority of sight over hearing; a response to the Questión sobre la caballería (1444) of Íñigo López de Mendoza, 1st Marquess of Santillana; a Devocional that has been lost, etc.

Preceded by Paul of Burgos	Bishop of Burgos; 1435–1456	Succeeded by Luis de Acuña y Osorio
