= Battle of Venta de Echavarri =

Battle of the First Carlist War

Coordinates: 42°52′05″N 2°30′02″W

- Part of First Carlist War
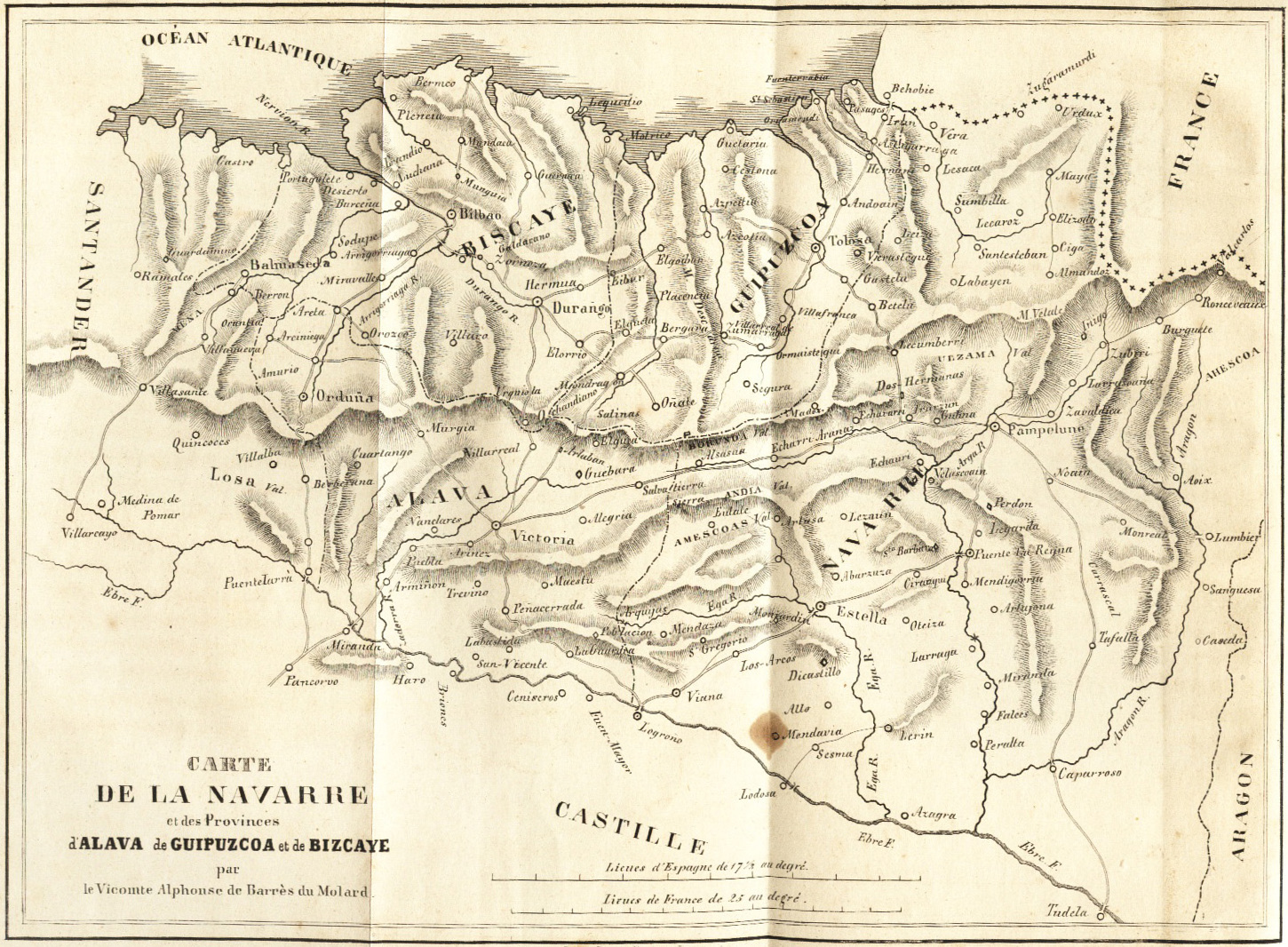
- Map of Navarre and the Provinces of Alava, Guipuzcoa and Bizcaya
Date	28 October 1834
Location	near Álava, Basque Country, Spain
Result	Carlist victory

Belligerents
Carlists supporting Infante Carlos of Spain	Liberals (Isabelinos or Cristinos) supporting Isabella II of Spain and her regent mother Maria Christina

Commanders and leaders
Tomás de Zumalacárregui; Manuel Iturralde	Joaquín de Osma

Strength
	3,000

Casualties and losses
	500 dead, 450 captured

The Battle of Venta de Echavarri (Spanish: Acción de la Venta de Echavarri or Batalla de la Venta de Echavarri, literally the Battle of the Inn of Echavarri), a battle of the First Carlist War, occurred on October 28, 1834. It was an immediate follow-up to the Battle of Alegría de Álava, which had occurred the day before. It was a Carlist victory.

== Background ==
In the aftermath of the Battle of Alegría de Álava on October 27, the Carlists searched the forests between Chinchetru and Alegría de Álava for Liberal troops who had survived the battle and were now hiding. Liberals who were discovered were executed on the spot.

The Carlists captured the two pieces of artillery that had belonged to the Liberal army, along with corresponding munitions and the regimental banner of the Liberal Regiment of Africa. Manuel O'Doyle and other Liberal officers surrendered, and were executed by firing squad the next day.

However, 250 Liberal troops and their officers maintained order and reached Arrieta by forced march, 3 km away from the field of battle, and they fortified themselves in the church at Arrieta. There they fought against the Carlists who pursued them all during the night.

News of this action at Arrieta led Osma to the decision to send soldiers to the rescue of the troops at Arrieta the next morning, which would lead to the Battle of Venta de Echavarri.

== The terrain ==
Zumalacárregui took advantage of his knowledge of the terrain to trick his enemy, luring the Liberals to places more suited to the guerrilla tactics of the Carlists than the maneuvers of the Isabeline regulars. The terrain of the battle was laid out as such: leaving Vitoria for the old royal road towards the East, one crosses a plain for 12 kilometers, flanked on the right or South by the foothills of the range of Andia and on the left or North by the range of San Adrián. The Zadorra River, coming from the East, runs close to the range of San Adrián. The plain slopes gently from the south to the north, and rises, almost imperceptibly, towards the east.

At the end of this distance of 12 kilometers rises the height of Quilchano, to which reach from the East the hills of Dallo, thus cutting the plain in two. The left of the plain slopes towards the Zadorra while the right sinks into a 60 meter deep depression. The northern slopes of the hills of Dallo slope gently towards the Dallo while its southern slopes, rocky and devoid of any vegetation, fall precipitously towards the depression. This southern slope is where the royal road runs.

At the bottom of the slope there is a breach towards the north in the hills of Dallo, there is a creek into which the Zadorra drains. There is a bridge over this creek, and on the other side (in the direction of Vitoria) can be found the place known as la venta de Echavarri –in other words, the Inn of Echavarri, where waggoners and travelers, either on their way up or down the hills, would stop for repairs, food, and gossip. Near the inn, about a kilometer and a half away, can be found the place known as Echavarri-Urtupiña, and more towards the east 2 and half kilometers away, is the place known as Arrieta.

== Troops ==
Osma's troops included O'Doyle's former division, which included:

- 2nd Queen's Regiment
- First and Second Regiments of Carabiniers
- Battalion of Bujalance

The Liberal troops also included:

- The Battalion of San Fernando
- Two pieces of artillery
- About 100 horsemen

The Carlists counted on:

- The Guías de Navarra
- First, Third, Fourth, Sixth Battalions of Navarre
- Second Battalion of Guipúzcoa
- Third Battalion of Álava
- A squadron of Navarre lancers (lanceros de Navarra)

== The battle ==
Osma's troops reached the heights of Quilchano and spotted the Carlists in oblique formation in the depression near Arrieta. It was two o’clock in the afternoon. Zumalacarregui knew that Osma wished to release the Liberal troops trapped in Arrieta, and therefore masked the place, formed his men, and addressed his men –to which they responded with A ellos! A ellos! ("At'em! At'em!")

Osma moved his troops. Two battalions of carabineers with their squadron of cavalry and a company of the Battalion of Bujalance descended into the valley. Once they crossed the bridge, the First Battalion of Carabineers under Martín Iriarte, and a company of mountain troops from the Battalion of Bujalance ascended to the nearest hills of Dallo, creating the Isabeline left flank. The Second Battalion of Carabineers and a squadron of cavalry remained at the bottom of the valley, forming the Isabeline right flank.

On the peak that rose above the inn, on the west to the opening that empties into the Zadorra were stationed half of the Queen’s Second Battalion and at the entrance to this opening were stationed a 50 members of the cavalry company of the Bujalance. On the slope, as a reserve there remained the other half of the Queen’s Second Battalion with 50 cavalrymen, the Battalion of Salamanca, and the rest of the Bujalance Battalion. The Battalion of San Fernando remained near the height of the depression, to the right. Two eight-pounders were placed on the slope near the bridge.

The Isabeline formation was defensively arranged, without a center, contrary to its goal of advancing towards Arrieta. Osma believed that Zumalacárregui, victorious after the Battle of Alegría de Alava, would attack the Liberals, advancing through the depression. The Liberal plan was to allow the Carlists to attack and then bombard them with artillery, and the Liberals in the valley would then pursue the Carlists until Arrieta.

Zumalacárregui, understanding the intentions of the Liberal troops, and knowledgeable of the terrain, advanced his troops across the valley but before they were in reach of the Liberal artillery, he sent the majority of his troops rapidly towards the north and up the hills of Dallo. Once at the top, the Carlists were able to advance rapidly since the slopes of the Dallo on the north sloped gently, and approached the Isabeline troops on the hilltop. Osma had stationed few troops there, and seems to have been lacking in knowledge of the terrain, believing that the north face of the hills had the same formation as those of the south, and that the Isabeline troops would be able to defend themselves easily there against a numerically superior foe, as if behind an actual wall. But the Isabelines on the hilltops were not able to withstand the attack of the Carlist First and Third Battalions of Navarre, and abandoned their positions, descending towards the bridge. The Carlists, occupying the crests, continued to advance by the northern slopes, and reached the opening and advanced towards the bridge. Osma, on the hilltop, did not have a clear view of what was happening on his left flank, but on seeing his troops descend from the hilltops, sent as reinforcements to the bridge his reserve the rest of the Bujalance Battalion and half of the Queen's Battalion. But the Carlists troops were also arriving by the royal road to the same spot. With a battalion of Guías de Navarra at the Carlist vanguard, the Carlists crossed the bridge and assaulted the hilltop above the Inn of Echavarri, defended by half of the Queen’s Second Battalion.

Once the Isabeline troops of the right flank formed at the depression had joined combat, the left flank was surrounded by the Carlists and had begun to scatter. "Disregarding the enemy’s fire, the Carlists advanced, and the guides [Guías de Navarra] having passed a bridge at the distance of half a musket-shot, the Liberals' left was turned."

The right flank also began to break formation and scatter, escaping out of the depression, and suffering casualties inflicted by the Carlists. It seemed that a massacre like the one that had occurred at Alegría de Álava would occur, but Zumalacárregui ordered his troops to give quarter to those who surrendered. The battle had lasted barely an hour. The Carlists cleared the hill, and when the battle was over, a pursuit began, and along the royal road, the Liberals fled in complete disorder and were pursued to the very gates of Vitoria-Gasteiz. The Carlists captured 3,000 muskets as spoils of war.

== Aftermath ==
Osma, in his account of the battle to Isabel II, placed all of the blame on his troops, stating that "...all of the spots were abandoned [by the troops] without resistance, not heeding my own example to hold these spots nor stop from fleeing in a most humiliating fashion, and confirming what I have said to Your Majesty that everything is now lost, for all honor is lost..." Iriarte, however, who was one of Osma's officers, and who had participated in the battle, would criticize Osma for his actions during the battle, and it was concluded that Osma should have occupied the town of Echavarri-Urtupiña, converting it into a miniature stronghold with the two Liberal cannons. This would have allowed the Liberal troops at Arrieta to escape safely.

The Liberal troops trapped at Arrieta meanwhile had seen the whole battle from the churchtower. Fog descended upon the town and at midnight, with bayonets fixed, killed the few Carlists who had attempted to stop their escape. They reached Maetzu, where there was an Isabeline force. On November 1, 1834, they reached Vitoria without incident.

The Liberal Army was in disarray, and the Liberal troops at Pamplona barely had firewood with which to cook their meals. The two Liberal divisions of Navarre retired to the Puentelarreina–Pamplona Line, giving Zumalacárregui a golden opportunity to launch an attack on the rich zones of Navarre. The Carlist general would advance through Los Arcos, Sesma, Miranda de Arga, Peralta, Villafranca, crossing the Arga and Aragón Rivers and near the monastery of La Oliva and Sanguesa returned to the Pyrenees, crossing the Arga again north of Pamplona, finally stationing himself at La Berrueza. He would return with a number of supplies, clothes, money, and new troops. The morale of the Carlists was very high, and they decided to fight the Liberal troops in a formal battle (rather than with guerrilla tactics). This would happen on December 14, 1834, at the Battle of Mendaza –which would be a Carlist defeat.

== Sources ==
- Joaquín de Osma y Tricio. Archivo familiar. Archivo Histórico Diocesano de Logroño
- Joaquín de Osma y Tricio. Archivo General Militar de Segovia
- Manuel O'Doyle. Archivo General Militar de Segovia
- Boletín de Álava, meses octubre, noviembre y diciembre de 1834
- Boletín Oficial de Pamplona, meses de Noviembre 1834 y Enero 1835
- La Abeja. Diario Universal. Martes 11 de Noviembre de 1834. Madrid
- Alexis Sabatier.- Tío Tomás. Souvenirs d'un soldat de Charles V. Bordeaux 1836
- C.F. Henningsen.- The most striking events of a twelvemonth's campaign with Zumalacarregui, in Navarre and the Basque Provinces. 2 volumes. London, MDCCCXXXVI.
- Barón D. Du-Casse.- Échos de la Navarre. Quelques souvenirs d'un officier de Charles V. Paris 1840
- Alphonse Barres du Molard.- Memoires sur la guerre de la Navarre et des Provinces basques. París 1842
- Marqués de Miraflores.- Memorias para escribir la Historia contemporánea de los siete primeros años del reinado de Isabel II. Tomo primero. Madrid 1843
- Adolfo Loning.- Das spanische Volk. Hannover 1844
- Galería Militar Contemporánea. 2 tomos. Madrid 1846
- Juan Antonio Zaratiegui.- Vida y hechos de don Tomás Zumalacárregui. Madrid 1845
- Marcelino Oráa,- Memoria histórica de la conducta militar y política del General Oráa. Madrid 1851
- Joaquín Zayas y de la Vega.- Relación del desgraciado combate de Alegría, defensa del pueblo de Arrieta y retirada a Vitoria por Maeztu, desde el 27 de Octubre al 1º de Noviembre de 1834. Madrid 26 de Abril de 1870. Publicada en la sección de Adiciones del tomo VI de la Historia de la guerra civil y de los partidos liberal y carlista escrita por Antonio Pirala. Madrid 1870
