= Battle of Alegría de Álava =

Battle of the First Carlist War

Coordinates: 42°50′10″N 2°27′20″W

- Part of First Carlist War
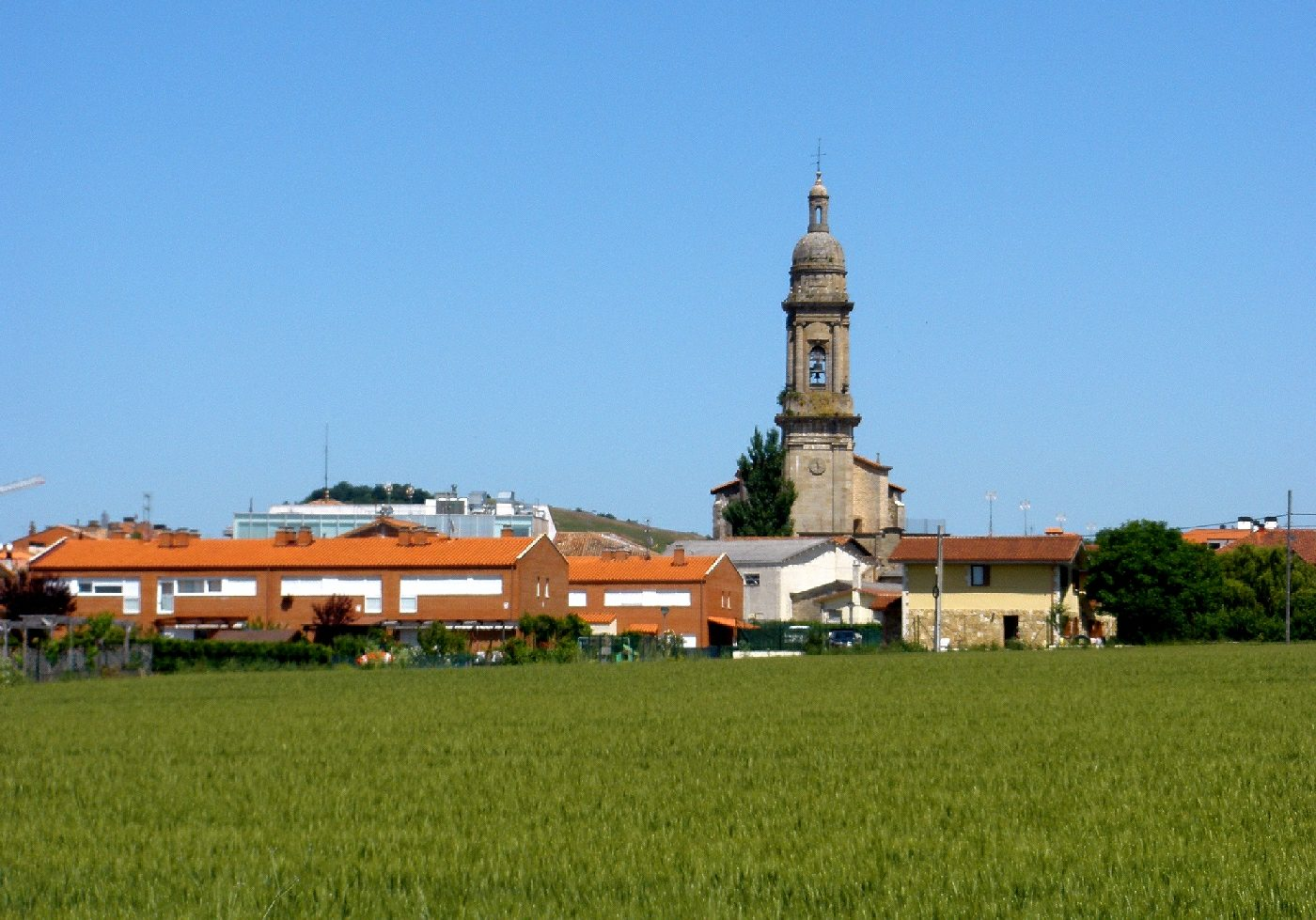
- The town of Alegría-Dulantzi
Date	27 October 1834
Location	Alegría de Álava, Álava, Spain
Result	Carlist victory

Belligerents
Carlists supporting Infante Carlos of Spain	Liberals (Isabelinos or Cristinos) supporting Isabella II of Spain and her regent mother Maria Christina

Commanders and leaders
Tomás de Zumalacárregui; Manuel Iturralde	Manuel O'Doyle

Casualties and losses
	~600

The Battle of Alegría de Álava (Acción de Alegría de Álava or Batalla de Alegría), a battle of the First Carlist War, occurred on October 27, 1834 at a field in Chinchetru, next to Alegría de Álava (Alegría-Dulantzi), Álava, Spain. It was a Carlist victory.

Carlist forces were led by Tomás de Zumalacárregui, who ambushed Isabeline (Liberal) troops under Manuel O'Doyle.

== Background ==
The Isabeline (Liberal) army under José Ramón Rodil, after a disastrous campaign during the summer of 1834, had attempted to destroy Zumalacárregui's army and arrest Infante Carlos, Count of Molina. However, Rodil's forces had been reduced by the Carlists by September 1834. Rodil was forced to give up command to Manuel Lorenzo. Rodil marched towards Madrid, taking with him as escort, as he approached Vitoria-Gasteiz, a division led by O'Doyle, which had belonged to the Liberal Army of Navarre. Rodil, without authorization, placed O'Doyle's troops under the command of Joaquín de Osma, commander-general of the Basque Provinces and who was based at Vitoria.

The Isabeline troops of Navarre, thus reduced, were unable to keep up with the rapid movements of Zumalacárregui's army. Zumalacárregui approached the Ebro with the intention of attacking the Riojan place known as Ezcaray, 40 km south of the river. Ezcaray was the site of important factories producing cotton cloths; Zumalacárregui wanted this cloth in order to create winter uniforms for his troops. Zumalacárregui's scouts explored this area to carry out this plan. Zumalacárregui meanwhile received information on October 20, 1834 that a convoy of arms was traveling from Burgos to Logroño and that it would use the nearby royal road (camino real) as it neared the Ebro.

Zumalacárregui attempted to pursue the convoy on October 21 with four battalions and three squadrons, and he crossed the Ebro at Tronconegro. However, the convoy by now had passed. Zumalacárregui rapidly marched in pursuit of the convoy, but he was stopped at Cenicero by the urban militia there, which supported the Liberals and who were stationed at the church of Cenicero. Zumalacárregui was forced to go around the town and his cavalry managed to reach the convoy, which was in sight of Logroño. Zumalacárregui captured this rich booty, burned down the church of Cenicero, crossed the Ebro on October 22 at Tronconegro, and marched towards Navarre. His troops were then stationed in towns in the valley of Berrueza.

On October 21, at the last minute, the Liberals at Vitoria received news of Zumalacárregui's incursion, and Osma ordered O'Doyle to march on the Ebro with his division, composed of the Queen's First and Second Regiments, the First African Regiment, the First and Second Regiments of Carabiniers, and the battalion of Bujalance. O'Doyle was ordered to march on the Ebro at Peñacerrada to cut Zumalacárregui off.

O'Doyle reached Peñacerrada on October 22, during the afternoon, and learned that the Carlists were north of the Ebro. O'Doyle marched the next day through the valley of the Ega River, and his troops rested for the night at Lagrán. On the 24th, the Liberals reached Maeztu. The Liberal troops, exhausted and short on supplies, rested for a full day, the 25th. On the 26th of October, the troops left Maetzu, crossed the ridge of Andia, and after marching for 22 km, reached Alegría de Álava.

Osma then ordered O’Doyle to disperse the Liberal divisions; the only troops that should remain at Alegría de Álava would be the Queen's First Regiment, First African Regiment, some of the cavalry, and two pieces of artillery, with the rest of the troops cantoned at Guevara (Gebara), Arroyabe, and Ullíbarri-Gamboa (Uribarri-Ganboa), locations that were 6, 12, and 13 km north of Alegría de Álava, respectively.

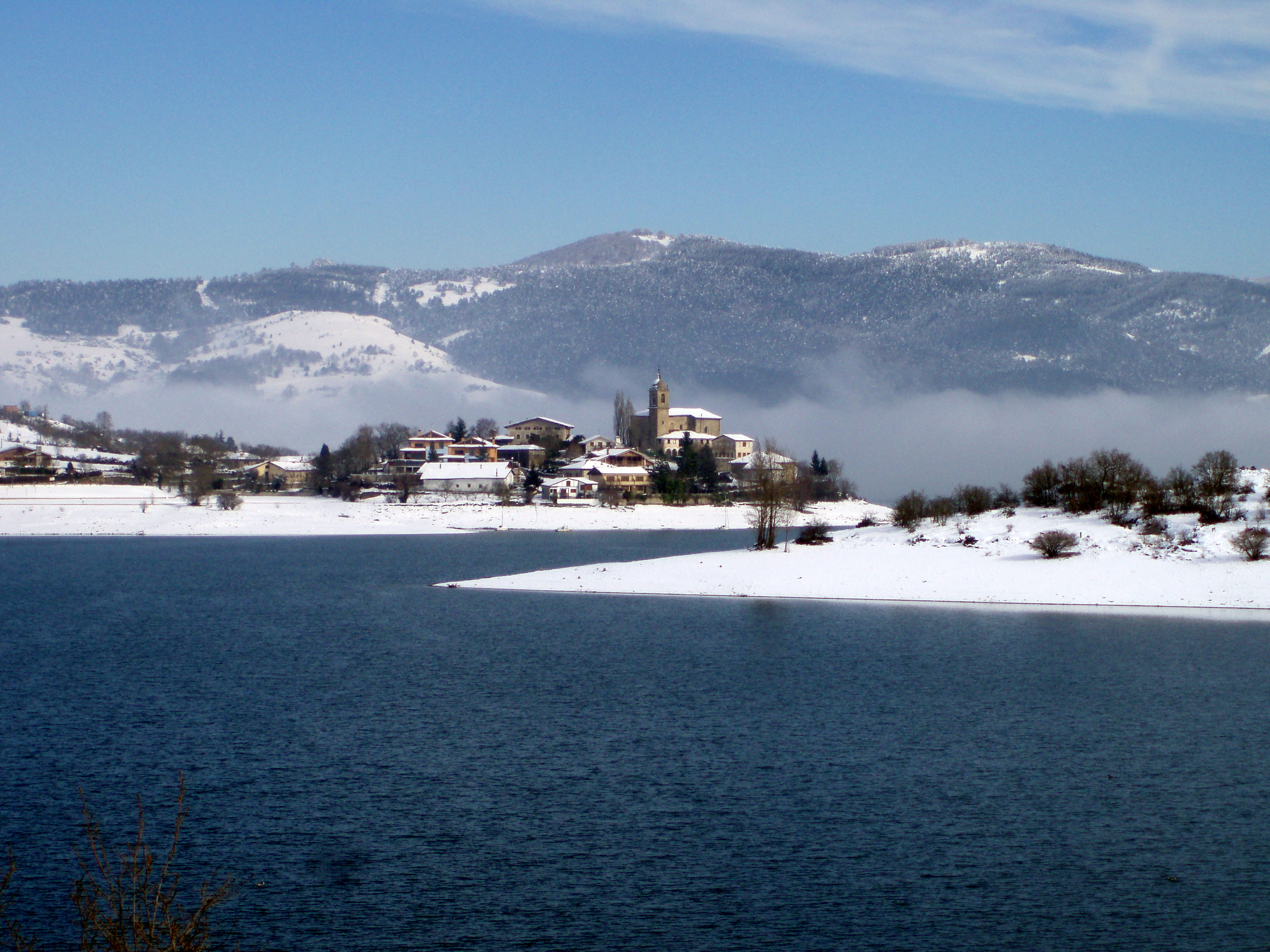
Ullíbarri-Gamboa.

O'Doyle disagreed with this order, and consulted his regimental captains, who also thought it was a bad idea. But they carried out the order, abandoning Alegría de Álava and occupying the aforementioned villages. O'Doyle wrote a letter to Osma, expressing his concern with the order.

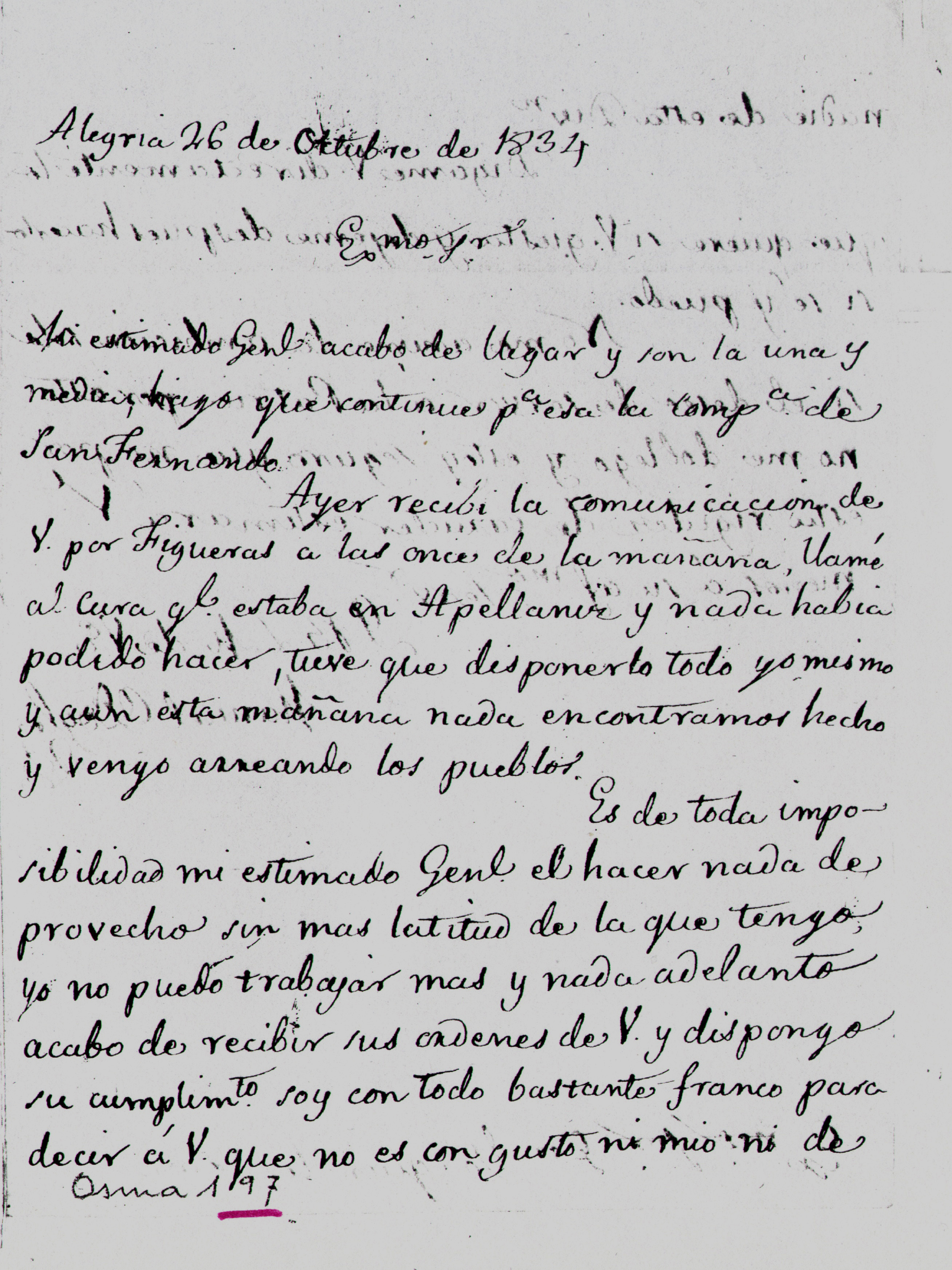
Letter from Manuel O'Doyle to Joaquín de Osma. October 26, 1834. In the letter, O'Doyle expresses his concerns about the orders he has received from Osma to abandon Alegría de Álava.

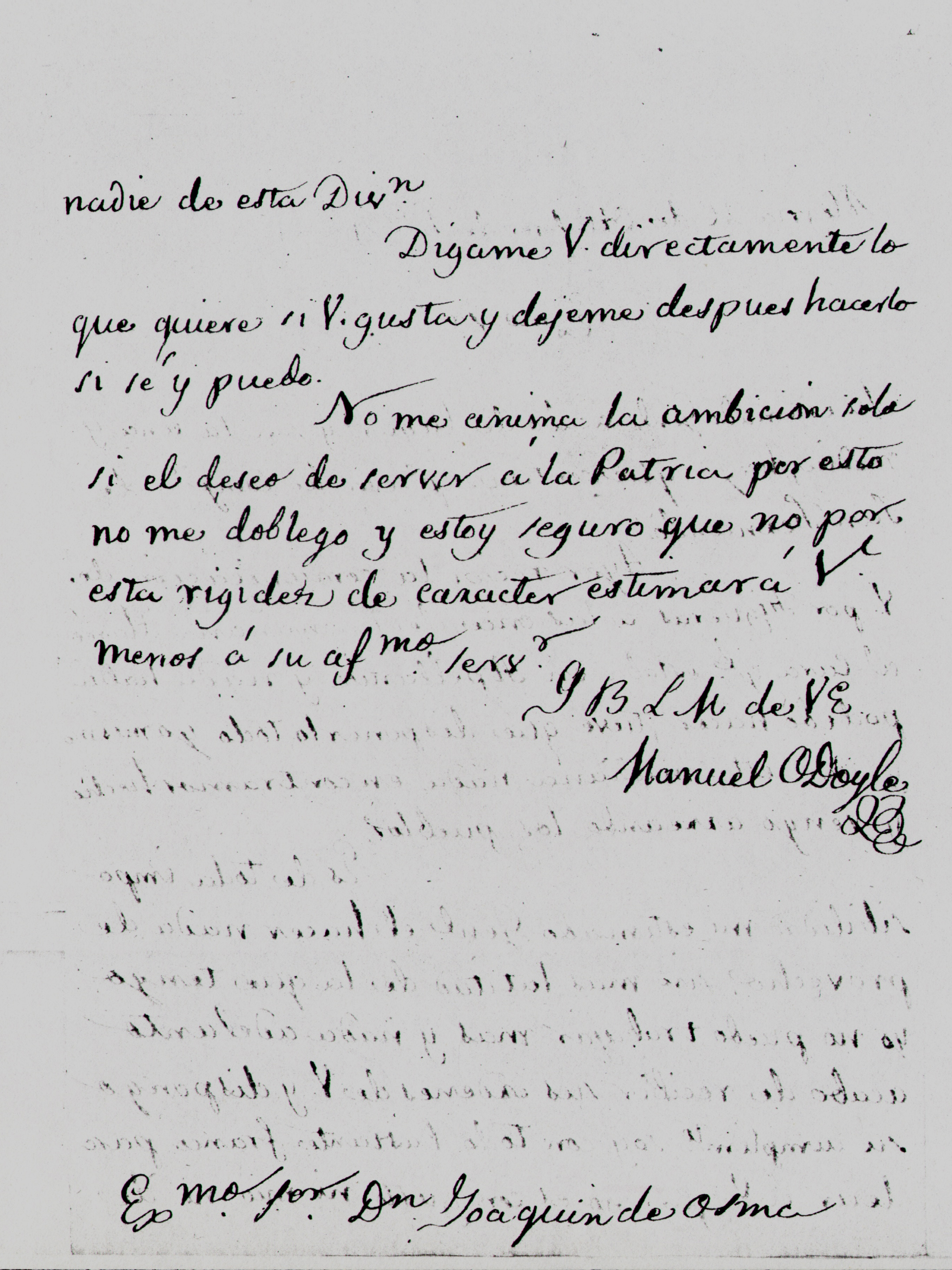
Back of the letter.

Zumalacárregui, meanwhile, was in the valley of La Berrueza, 48 km south of Alegría de Álava, and had in his sights, the Liberal troops at Los Arcos of General Lorenzo, who was waiting for reinforcements coming from Cirauqui led by Marcelino de Oraá Lecumberri. Zumalacárregui's aduaneros (customs officers) were watching the movements of the Liberal troops, and thus Zumalacárregui was well informed. The aduaneros were also watching O'Doyle's movements, and when O'Doyle's troops left Alegría de Álava, the aduaneros notified Zumalacárregui, who received this news in the afternoon.

However, Zumalacárregui did not have sufficient forces to face an entire Liberal division –but he did have enough to face a few battalions. He thus decided to head for Álava and engage with Liberal troops who were headed for the various aforementioned villages. At nighttime, Zumalacárregui left a few men behind to keep the campfires going and took his troops to Campezo, Zúñiga and Orbiso—a village in the Maeztu area)—where they spent the night. Now Zumalacárregui was 35 km from Alegría de Álava. The Liberal general Lorenzo, seeing the campfires that had been left going at Berrueza, believed that Zumalacárregui's troops had remained there.

== The battle ==
On October 27, Osma arrived at an early hour at Alegría de Álava, explaining to O'Doyle his reasoning behind his order for the dispersal of the Liberal troops: Osma had received news that the pretender to the throne, Carlos, was at Oñate. O'Doyle's divisions, now arranged as four columns, would depart from the town that same afternoon towards the north, marching at night, to reach Oñate by various routes and apprehend the pretender.

The Carlist army meanwhile, fired by a ration of aguardiente given to them by Zumalacárregui (as was his custom before going into battle), was divided into two columns. One of the columns was under the command of Manuel Iturralde, and consisted of the Third, Fourth, and Sixth Battalions of Navarre and the Second Battalion of Guipúzcoa, and had orders to climb the mountains from Saseta. The other column, commanded by Zumalacárregui, consisted of the Guías de Navarra, the First Battalion of Navarre, the Third Battalion of Álava, and the lancers of Navarre, and would advance from Ullíbarri-Gamboa (Uribarri-Ganboa).

As they traveled, the Carlists apprehended anybody they came across, such as people working in the fields, and placed them in an enclosure guarded by two soldiers; this they did to avoid anyone from alerting the Liberals of the presence of the Carlist troops. The Carlists soon came across no one around or in the fields, which they intuited signified the nearness of the Liberal army.

Zumalacárregui received news that Lorenzo was still not aware of the Carlist advance; Lorenzo remained at Los Arcos. Zumalacárregui would send a small number of troops to attack Salvatierra (Agurain), 10 km east of Alegría de Álava. Zumalacárregui would remain hidden with his troops, meanwhile, in the forest of Chinchetru (Txintxetru), where they would wait for O'Doyle, who presumably would leave his HQ to defend Salvatierra. Iturralde meanwhile would descend from Saseta, hide in the woody mountain slopes south of Alegría de Álava, and, once O'Doyle departed towards Salvatierra, Iturralde would march in parallel. Once Zumalacárregui began the attack at Chinchetru, Iturralde would attack from the right against the Isabelines.

As it happened, circumstances favored Zumalacárregui. When the Carlist general marched towards Chinchetru, he came across the governor of Salvatierra who was headed towards Vitoria with some prisoners. At 4:00 PM, O'Doyle's troops began to leave Alegría de Álava, heading towards the north, when the sound of gunfire erupted at Chinchetru. Zumalacárregui increased the overall sounds of gunfire by having his soldiers also fire into the air. Then, he hid in the forest north of the town of Alegría de Álava.

O'Doyle stopped heading north and headed towards the east instead, through the hills, a shorter route towards Chinchetru. The terrain was difficult; these foothills towards the range of Andía were woody and not suited for the passage of regular troops. Furthermore, the setting sun caused the weapons of the Liberals to glint brightly; this allowed Zumalacárregui to spot the Liberals easily from Chinchetru.

Zumalacárregui ordered the Guías de Navarra to leave the forest and ordered them to the plain between Chinchetru and these hills. The Isabeline vanguard, led by O'Doyle on horseback, was composed of mountain troops (cazadores) and thus marched much faster than the main body of Liberal troops. The Liberal troops soon came across the Guías de Navarra, who were wearing their signature red berets, and were surprised to see the Carlists there. O'Doyle ordered an attack but the Liberal cazadores were quickly pushed back by the Guías de Navarra.

When the rest of the Liberal troops arrived, Zumalacárregui ordered the rest of his troops into battle and fierce combat ensued.

One source writes that:

Zumalacarregui, though inferior in numbers, and without a single piece of cannon, yet perceiving from the impatient countenances of his men that they were eager to attack, at once gave his customary word of command, A ellos, muchachos! (At'em, my boys!) and with enthusiastic shouts of Aurrera mutillac! ["At’em, my boys" in Basque] the whole line moved on like a torrent.

Meanwhile, the Carlist Iturralde also appeared, attacking the Liberal rearguard and its right flank. The Liberal troops, suffering from confusion, were unable to organize themselves in such a small space, and after having fired an initial volley, were unable to defend themselves from a fierce Carlist bayonet attack. The Liberal troops began to surrender.

Meanwhile, the din of battle reached the local villages Guevara, Arroyabe, and Ullíbarri-Gamboa, where the remaining Liberal troops had been stationed. These Liberal troops began to march towards Chinchetru. But soon they encountered Liberal troops who had fled from what was amounting to a massacre, who informed them of what was happening. Thus, the retreating Liberal troops and the troops that had been stationed at these three villages fled to Vitoria, which they reached by nighttime.

== Aftermath ==
During the night, the Carlists searched the forests between Chinchetru and Alegría de Álava for Liberal troops who had survived the battle and were now hiding. Liberals who were discovered were bayoneted or shot on sight.

The Carlists captured the two pieces of artillery that had belonged to the Liberal army, along with corresponding munitions, supplies, and the regimental banner of the Liberal Regiment of Africa. O'Doyle, O'Doyle's brother, and other officers surrendered, and were executed by firing squad the next day. 400 Liberal troops were taken prisoner.

However, 250 Liberal troops and their officers maintained order and reached Arrieta by forced march, 3 km away from the field of battle, and they fortified themselves in the church at Arrieta. There they fought against the Carlists who pursued them all during the night.

News of this action at Arrieta led Osma to the decision to send soldiers to the rescue of the troops at Arrieta, which would lead to the Battle of Venta de Echávarri (October 28, 1834).

== Order of battle at Alegría de Álava ==

                                   (1)                            
 (2)^^^^^^^^^^^^^^^^^^^^^^^^^^^^^^^^^^^^^^^^^^^^^^^^^^^^^^^^^^^^^^^^^^^^^^^^^
                (3)
                            (4)
                                  (5)
 (6)                                               (7)              (8)
                                                        ^^^^
                                                        (9)
                                         ^^^^^^^^^^^^^^^^
                                  (10)
 (11)^^^^^^^^^^^^^^^^^^^^^^^^^^^^^(12)^^^^^^^^^^^^^^^^^^(13)^^^^^^^^^^^^^^^^^

(1) Oñate. (2) Sierra de San Adrián. 3) Ulibarri-Gamboa. (4) Arroyabe. (5) Guevara. (6) Vitoria. (7) Arrieta. (8) Salvatierra. (9) Chinchetru. (10) Alegría de Álava. (11) Sierra de Andía. (12) Puerto de Saseta. (13) Puerto de Ulibarri.

== Sources ==
- Joaquín de Osma y Tricio. Archivo familiar. Archivo Histórico Diocesano de Logroño.
- Joaquín de Osma y Tricio. Archivo General Militar de Segovia'
- Manuel O'Doyle. Archivo General Militar de Segovia.
- Boletín de Álava, meses octubre, noviembre y diciembre de 1834
- Boletín Oficial de Pamplona, meses de Noviembre 1834 y Enero 1835
- La Abeja. Diario Universal. Martes 11 de Noviembre de 1834. Madrid
- Alexis Sabatier.- Tío Tomás. Souvenirs d'un soldat de Charles V. Bordeaux 1836
- C.F. Henningsen.- The most striking events of a twelvemonth's campaign with Zumalacarregui, in Navarre and the Basque Provinces. 2 tomos. London, MDCCCXXXVI.
- Barón D. Du-Casse.- Échos de la Navarre. Quelques souvenirs d'un officier de Charles V. Paris 1840
- Alphonse Barres du Molard.- Memoires sur la guerre de la Navarre et des Provinces basques. París 1842
- Marqués de Miraflores.- Memorias para escribir la Historia contemporánea de los siete primeros años del reinado de Isabel II. Tomo primero. Madrid 1843
- Adolfo Loning.- Das spanische Volk. Hannover 1844
- Galería Militar Contemporánea. 2 tomos. Madrid 1846
- Juan Antonio Zaratiegui.- Vida y hechos de don Tomás Zumalacárregui. Madrid 1845
- Marcelino Oráa.- Memoria histórica de la conducta militar y política del General Oráa. Madrid 1851
- Joaquín Zayas y de la Vega.- Relación del desgraciado combate de Alegría, defensa del pueblo de Arrieta y retirada a Vitoria por Maeztu, desde el 27 de Octubre al 1º de Noviembre de 1834. Madrid 26 de Abril de 1870. Publicada en la sección de Adiciones del tomo VI de la Historia de la guerra civil y de los partidos liberal y carlista escrita por Antonio Pirala. Madrid 1870
