= Zúñiga, Navarre =

Settlement in Navarre, Spain

Coordinates: 42.700°N 2.300°W

Zúñiga is a town and municipality located in the province and autonomous community of Navarre, northern Spain.

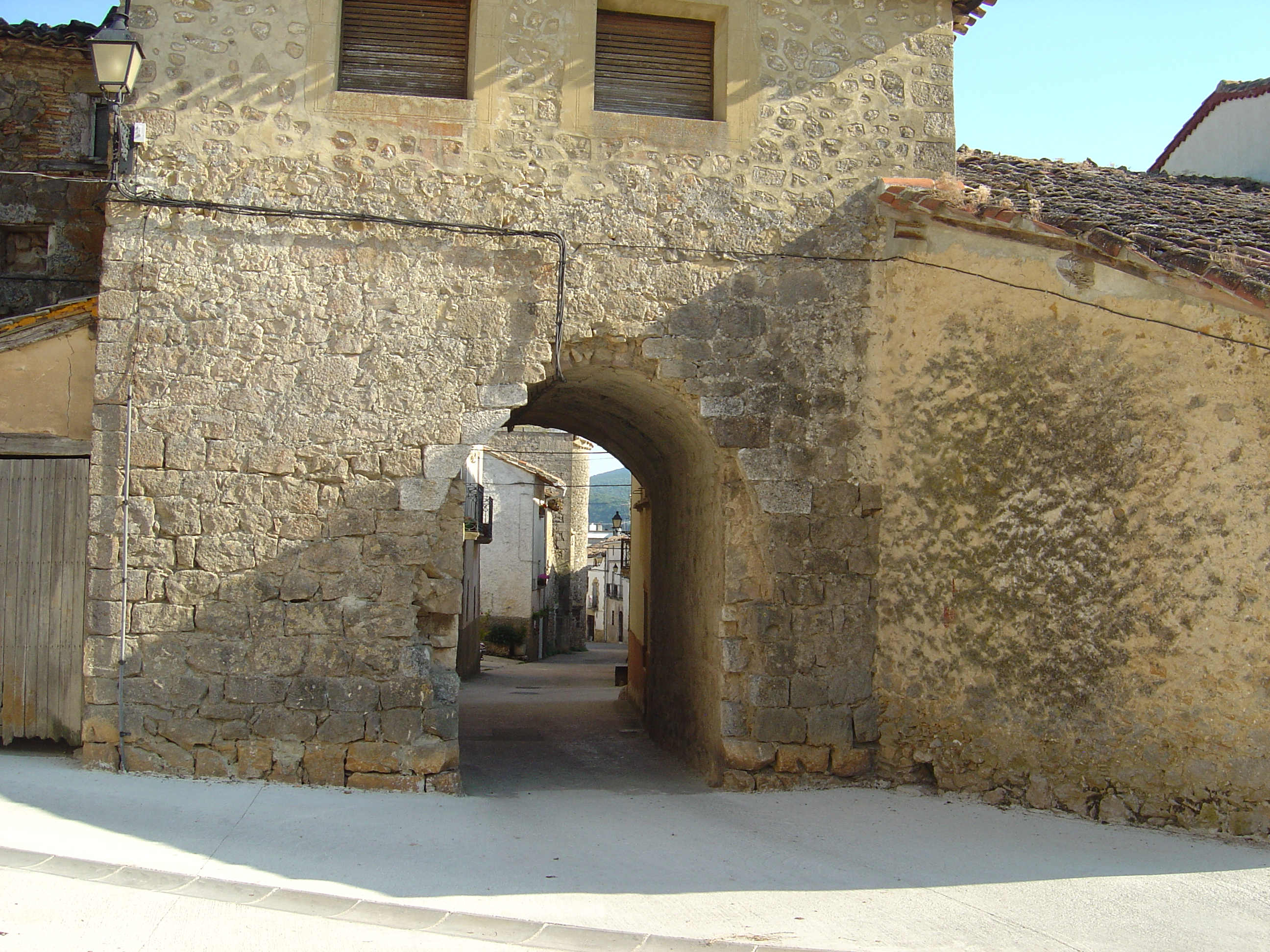
Zuñiga town walls

This town was known as Estuñiga, particularly during the Middle Ages, and between that time and the present, it has gone through many spelling variations.

The Carlist General Zumalacarregui slept here on 26 October 1834 on the eve of his twin victories over the Liberals at La Alegria and Venta de Echavarri on 27–28 October 1834.

Zúñiga and its variant Zúniga is also a surname, particularly common in the Basque region of Spain and in areas where significant numbers of Basques have immigrated to, including Central America, Chile, and Mexico, to which some of the most important members of the old Zúñiga family went. Famous actress Daphne Zuniga's paternal heritage is Guatemalan. There are also significant numbers of people with this surname in Ecuador, Colombia, Peru, and surrounding countries.

== See also ==
- Álvaro de Zúñiga y Guzmán
