= Egileta =

Hamlet in Álava, Spain

- Concejo
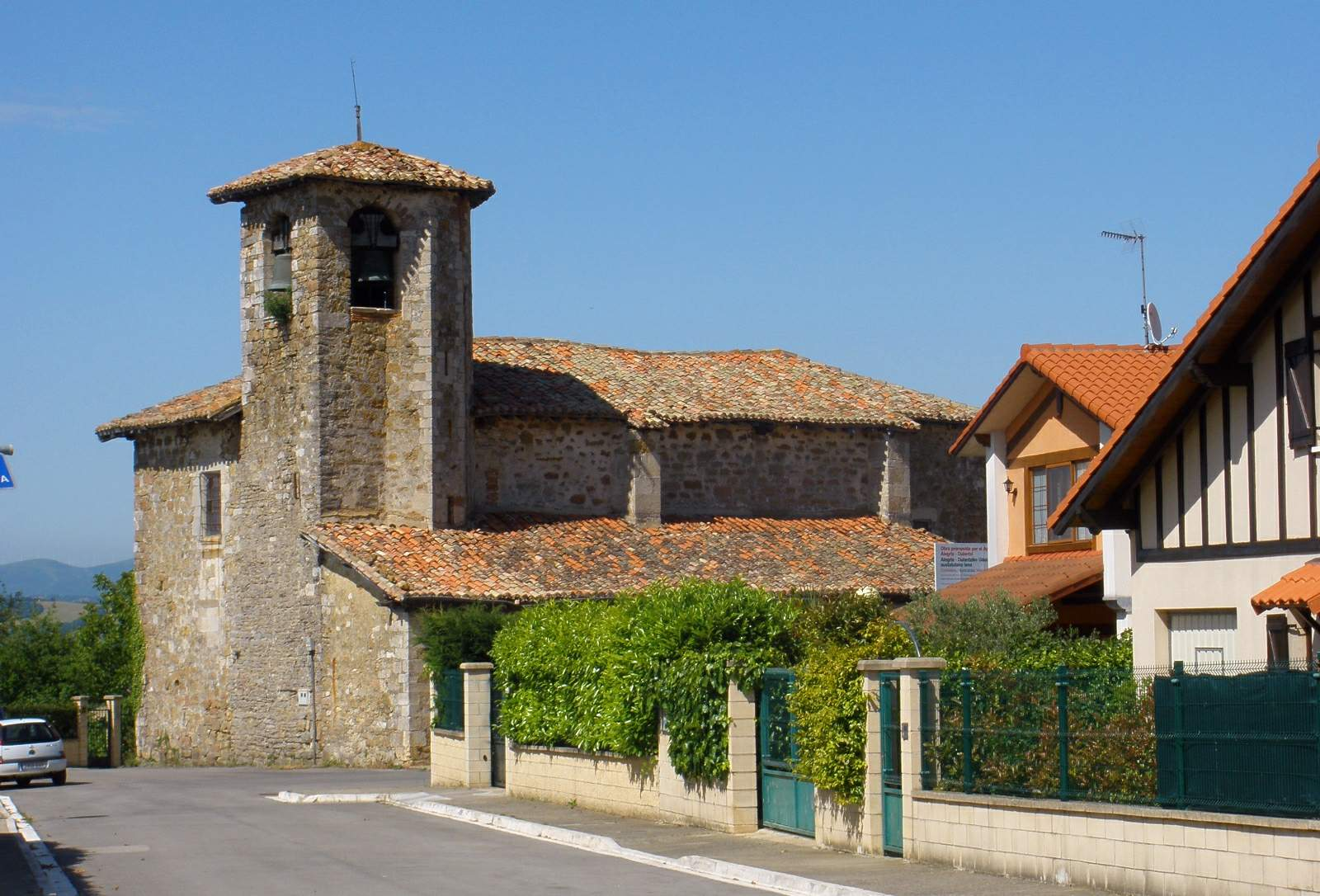
- Parish church

- Coat of arms

- Location within Álava Location within the Basque Country Location within Spain
- Coordinates: 42°48′35.3″N 2°32′3.1″W
- Country: Spain
- Autonomous community: Basque Country
- Province: Álava
- Comarca: Llanada Alavesa
- Municipality: Alegría-Dulantzi

Area
  - Total: 4.37 km^{2} (1.69 sq mi)
- Elevation: 630 m (2,070 ft)

Population (2021)
  - Total: 112
  - Density: 25.6/km^{2} (66.4/sq mi)
- Postal code: 01193

Egileta (Basque pronunciation: [eɣileta], Spanish: Eguileta [eɣiˈleta]) is a hamlet and concejo located in the municipality of Alegría-Dulantzi, in Álava province, Basque Country, Spain.

== Geography ==
Egileta is a small exclave located to the southwest of Alegría-Dulantzi.
