= Alegría-Dulantzi =

Municipality in Spain

- Municipality
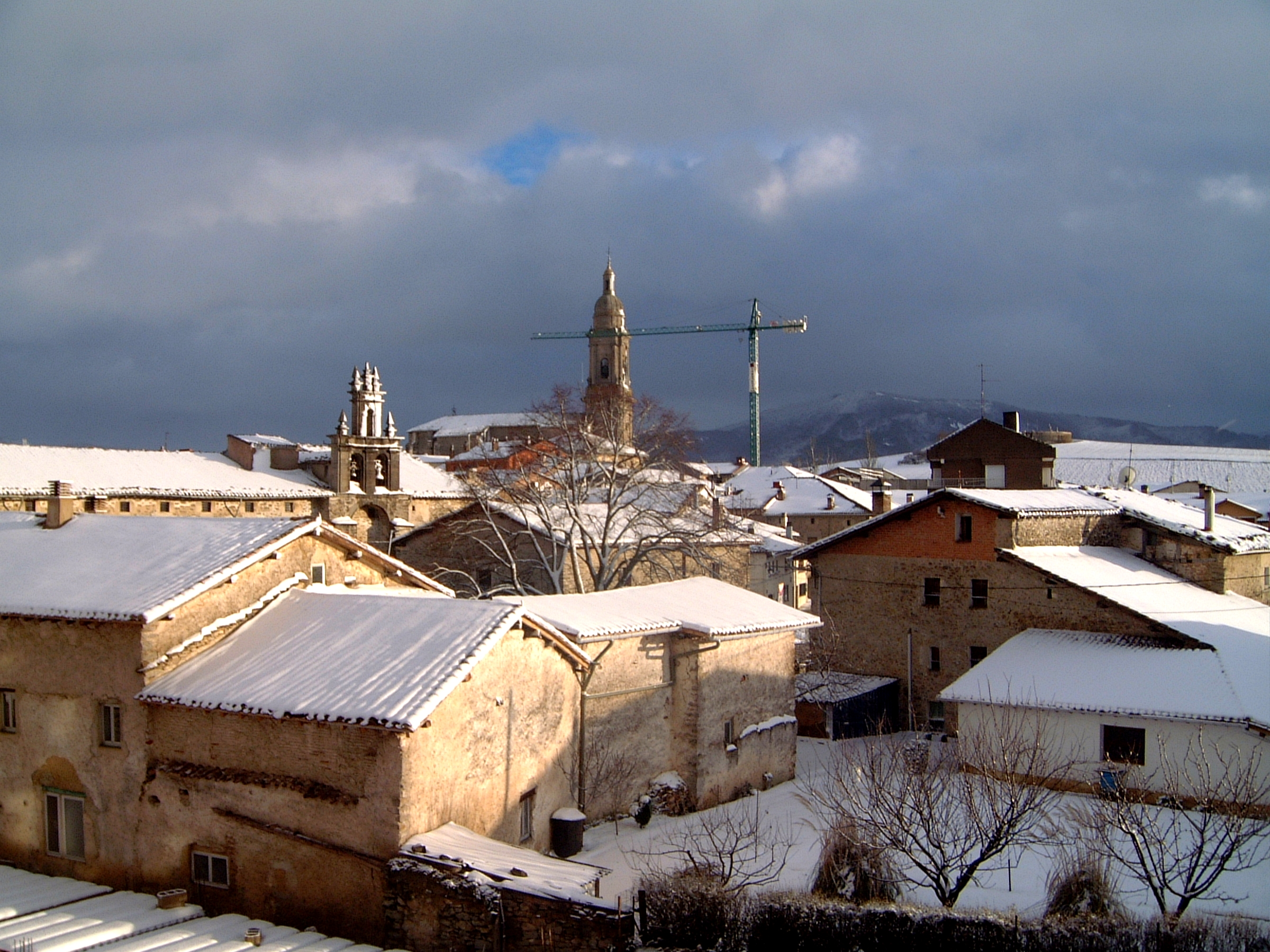
- View of the village

- Coat of arms

- Location of Alegría-Dulantzi within the Basque Country
- Coordinates: 42°50′39″N 2°30′43″W
- Country: Spain
- Autonomous community: Basque Country
- Province: Álava
- Comarca: Llanada Alavesa

Government
  - Mayor: Joseba Koldo Garitagoitia Odria (AIA)

Area
  - Total: 19.95 km^{2} (7.70 sq mi)
- Elevation: 567 m (1,860 ft)

Population (2025-01-01)
  - Total: 2,955
  - Density: 148.1/km^{2} (383.6/sq mi)
- Time zone: UTC+1 (CET)
  - Summer (DST): UTC+2 (CEST)
- Postal code: 01193, 01240
- Official language(s): Basque; Spanish
- Website: Official website

Alegría-Dulantzi (Spanish: Alegría [aleˈɣɾi.a], Basque: Dulantzi [dulants̻i]), formerly known in Spanish as Alegría de Álava, is a village and municipality located in the province of Álava, in the Basque Country, northern Spain. It is located at some 14 km (8.7 mi) from the provincial capital, Vitoria-Gasteiz.

The Battle of Alegría de Álava took place here in 1834.

== Geography ==
=== Administrative subdivisions ===
Alegría-Dulantzi is divided into 2 villages, both of them organized as concejos. By far the larger of the two is the municipal centre and township of Alegría-Dulantzi itself, which accounts for some 95% of the municipality's population. The other one is Egileta, an exclave located to the southeast.

Official name	Basque name	Spanish name	Population (2021)	Area (km^{2})
Alegría-Dulantzi	Dulantzi	Alegría	2,813	15.46
Egileta	Egileta	Eguileta	112	4.37
