= Sesma =

Town and municipality in Navarre, Spain

Coordinates: 42°29′N 2°05′W

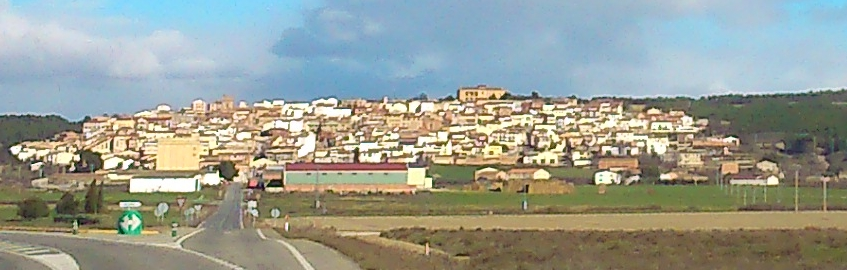

Sesma is a town and municipality located in the province and autonomous community of Navarre, northern Spain. It was the scene of action between Liberals under Narciso Lopez, and Carlists under Mendiry, during the First Carlist War, on 5th. November 1834 following the Carlist victory at Vitoria.
