= Guías de Navarra =

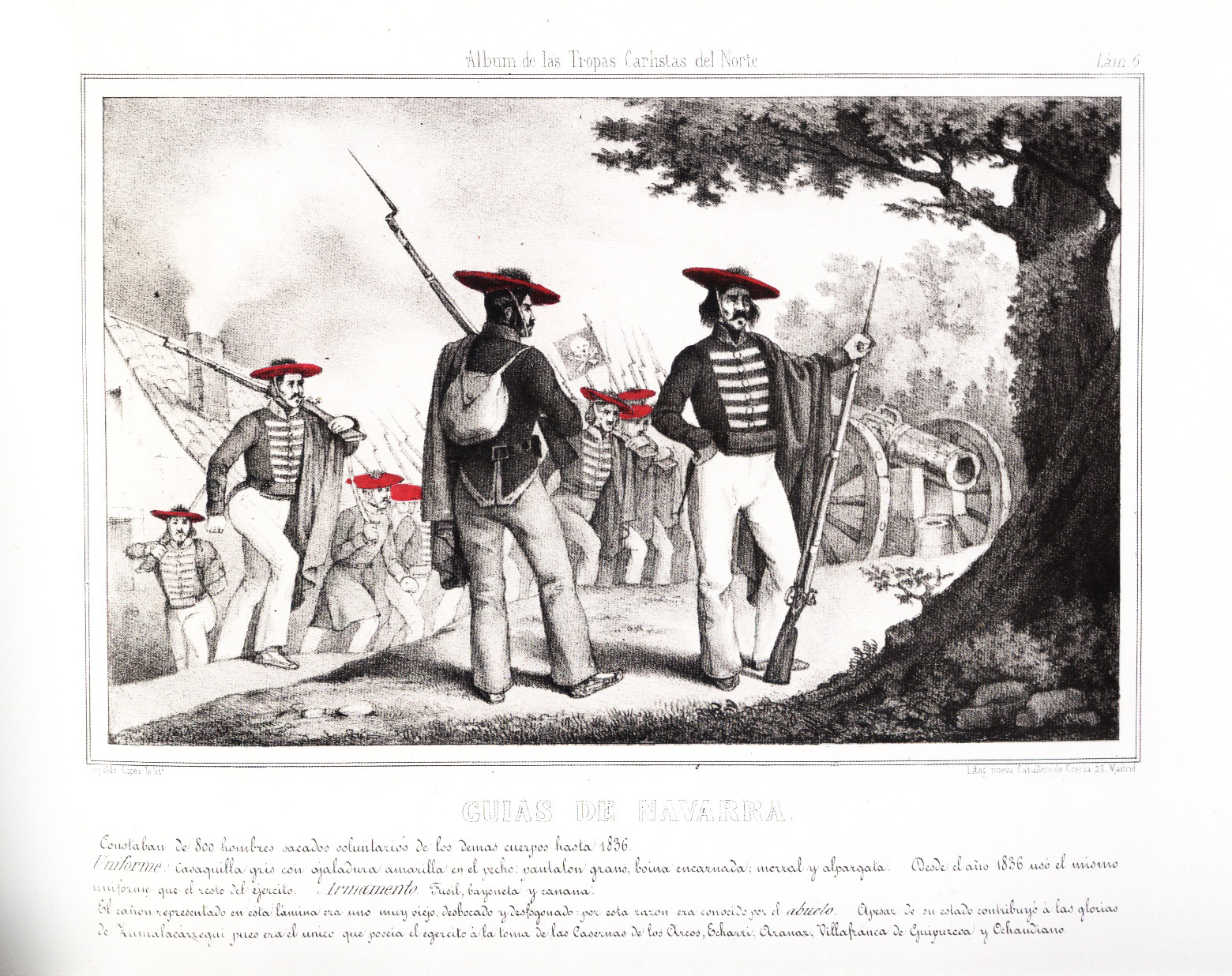
Guías de Navarra

The Guías de Navarra (Spanish: [ˈɡias ðe naˈβara], "Navarre Guides") were a Carlist battalion of the First Carlist War, created by Zumalacárregui in 1834.

Their name was a misnomer: they were neither Navarrese nor guides, but captured Liberal troops from La Mancha, Valencia, Andalusia and other places who had been made prisoners at the Battle of Alsasua (April 22, 1834). After this battle, they had been faced with the choice of joining the Carlist troops or being executed. They were given distinctive red berets that had initially been rejected by other Carlist troops as headgear.

The Carlist troops had lacked a regular uniform and had used instead the black beret that was already worn in the Basque region. Zumalacárregui gave these troops distinctive red berets, purchased in France, as a type of uniform. At first, the red berets were accepted with joy by Carlist officers, but they then realized that Liberal sharpshooters found the red berets to be a good target. The red berets were thus retired and hidden in a house in Eulate. When he created the Guías de Navarra, Zumalacárregui ordered that these red berets be brought to him and given to this new battalion, which was, in any case, used for the most dangerous missions.

The battalion was officered by Carlist volunteers from abroad. The Guías de Navarra were utilized for the most dangerous or risky missions, and Zumalacárregui soon favored them. Serving the battalion as an officer soon became considered an honor by the Carlists. After the death of Zumalacárregui, the prestige accorded this battalion meant that it was no longer used for the most dangerous missions.

They participated in the Battle of Alegría de Álava (October 27, 1834).

The Guías de Navarra were fully integrated in 1836 into the Carlist army as a regular battalion.

== Description, equipment, and uniforms ==
The Álbum de las tropas carlistas del ejército del norte states that they were a battalion of 800 men and that their uniform consisted of a gray casaquilla (a kind of short and loose jacket with sleeves, which was worn over other clothes) with a yellow series of holes for the buttons on the breast of the check; a red beret; a bag; and alpargatas, a sort of light sandal made of hemp. Their weapons were a rifle, bayonet, and bandolier.

According to Alexis Sabatier, their yellow buttonholes on their gray cloaks caused soldiers from the other battalions to call the Guías de Navarra sardinas ("sardines").

== Sources ==
- Álbum de las tropas carlistas del ejército del norte. Madrid, sin fecha. (184?).
- Juan Antonio Zaratiegui. Vida y hechos de don Tomás de Zumalacárregui. San Sebastián, 1946.
- C.F. Henningsen. Campaña de doce meses en Navarra y las Provincias Vascongadas con el General Zumalacárregui. Madrid 1935.
- Alexis Sabatier. "Tío Tomás". Burdeos 1836
