= Adolf Loning =

German official and writer

Adolf or Adolfo Loning was a German official and writer who served as a lieutenant in the Guardia Real of Ferdinand VII of Spain during the 1830s. Travelling to Spain, he enlisted in the Carlist army commanded by Tomás de Zumalacárregui - in his own memoirs, he states "I was the first German to enlist"

== Works ==
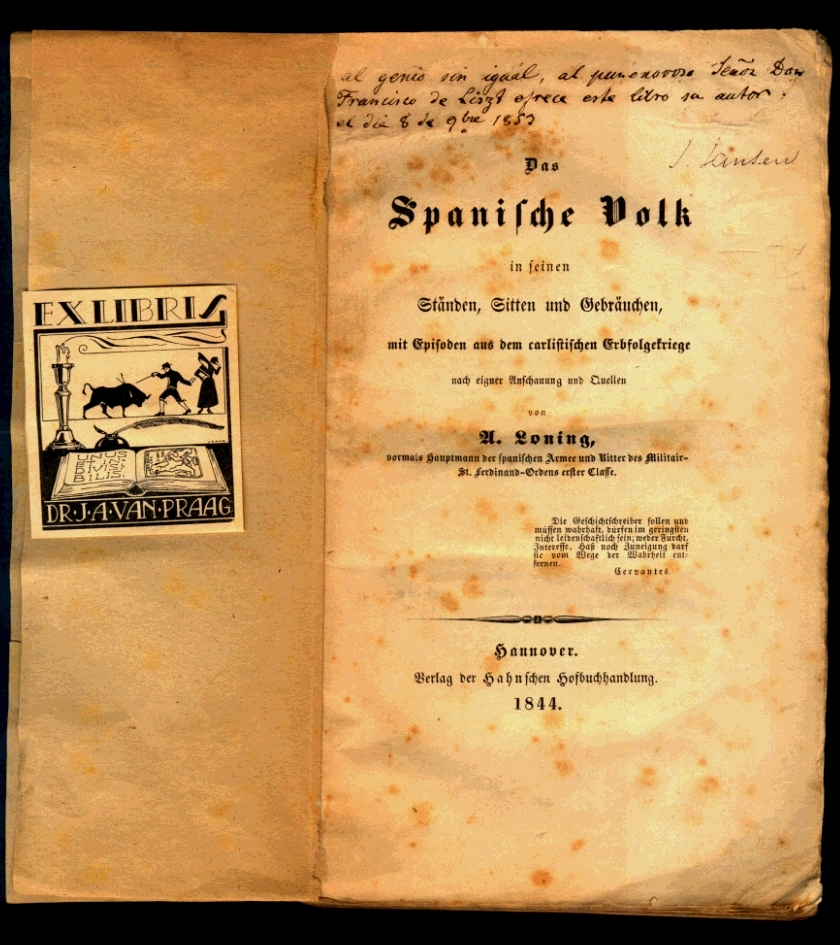
Title page of Das spanische Volk.

- Die Fueros des Königreiches Navarra und der Baskischen Provinzen Alava, Biscaya und Guipuzcoa. Helmingsche Hofbuchhandlung, Hannover, 1843
- Das spanische Volk in seinen Ständen, Sitten und Gebräuchen mit Episoden aus dem Karlistischen Erbfolgekriege (El pueblo español en sus clases, costumbres y usos con episodios de la guerra de sucesión carlista). Verlag der Hanschen Hofbuchhandlung. Hannover, 1844
