= Aduaneros =

Special military force in the First Carlist War in Spain

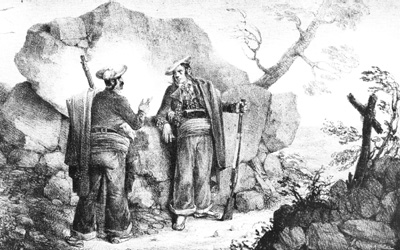
Aduaneros

The aduaneros (lit. "customs officers") were a special military force created by Tomás de Zumalacárregui during the First Carlist War in Spain. They were entrusted with the levying of revenue for various consumer goods. During the first years of the war, they prohibited the export and import of goods to isolated barracks and fortified villages that had sided with the Liberal (Isabeline) cause.

The aduaneros' uniform included corduroy pants, jacket, and vest; a flesh-colored corset; blue beret with white tassel; gray cloak; and alpargatas, a sort of light sandal made of hemp. Their weapons included a bandolier and carbine.

Mariano José de Larra wrote a satirical article about them called "Nadie pase sin hablar con el portero" ("No one can pass without speaking first with the doorman").

== Sources ==
- Álbum de las tropas carlistas del ejército del norte. Madrid, sin fecha. (184?)
- Juan Antonio Zaratiegui. Vida y hechos de don Tomás de Zumalacárregui. San Sebastián, 1946.
- C.F. Henningsen. Campaña de doce meses en Navarra y las Provincias Vascongadas con el General Zumalacárregui. Madrid 1935
- Diario de Guerra del Teniente General D. José Ignacio de Uranga. (1834-1838). San Sebastián 1959.
