= Tomás de Zumalacárregui =

Spanish Basque officer

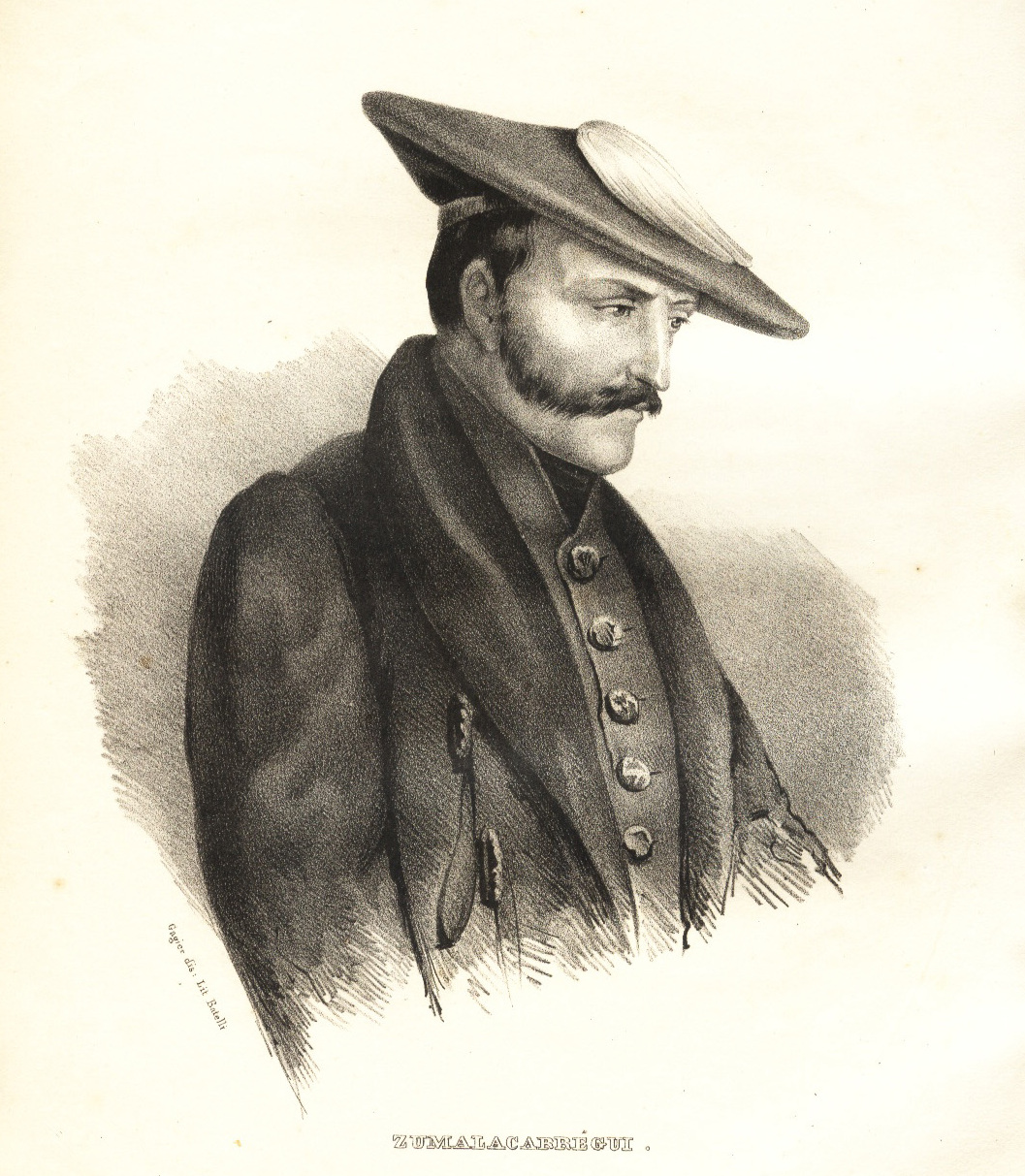
- Lithography of Zumalacárregui, 1837

Captain general of the Carlist Army
- In office 23 June 1835 – 24 June 1835
- Monarch: Infante Carlos

Personal details
- Born: Tomás de Zumalacárregui e Imaz; 29 December 1788 Ormaiztegi, Gipuzkoa, Spain
- Died: 24 June 1835 (aged 46)
- Parents: Francisco Antonio de Zumalacárregui y Múgica (father); Ana María de Imaz y Altolaguirre (mother)
- Occupation: Military commander

Tomás de Zumalacárregui e Imaz (Basque: Tomas Zumalakarregi Imatz; 29 December 1788 – 24 June 1835), known among his troops as "Uncle Tomás", was a Spanish Basque officer who led the Carlist faction as Captain general of the Army during the First Carlist War. He was occasionally nicknamed the "Wolf of the Amezcoas", making reference to his famous military victory in the region of Navarre.

Zumalacárregui is popularly credited as the inventor of the Spanish omelette (or tortilla de patatas), which he may have elaborated during the Siege of Bilbao.

== From the Peninsula War to Ferdinand VII ==
Zumalacárregui was born in Ormaiztegi in Gipuzkoa, a Basque province in Spain, on 29 December 1788. His father, Francisco Antonio de Zumalacárregui Muxica, was a lawyer who possessed some property, and the son was articled to a solicitor. His mother was Maria Ana Imaz Altolaguirre.

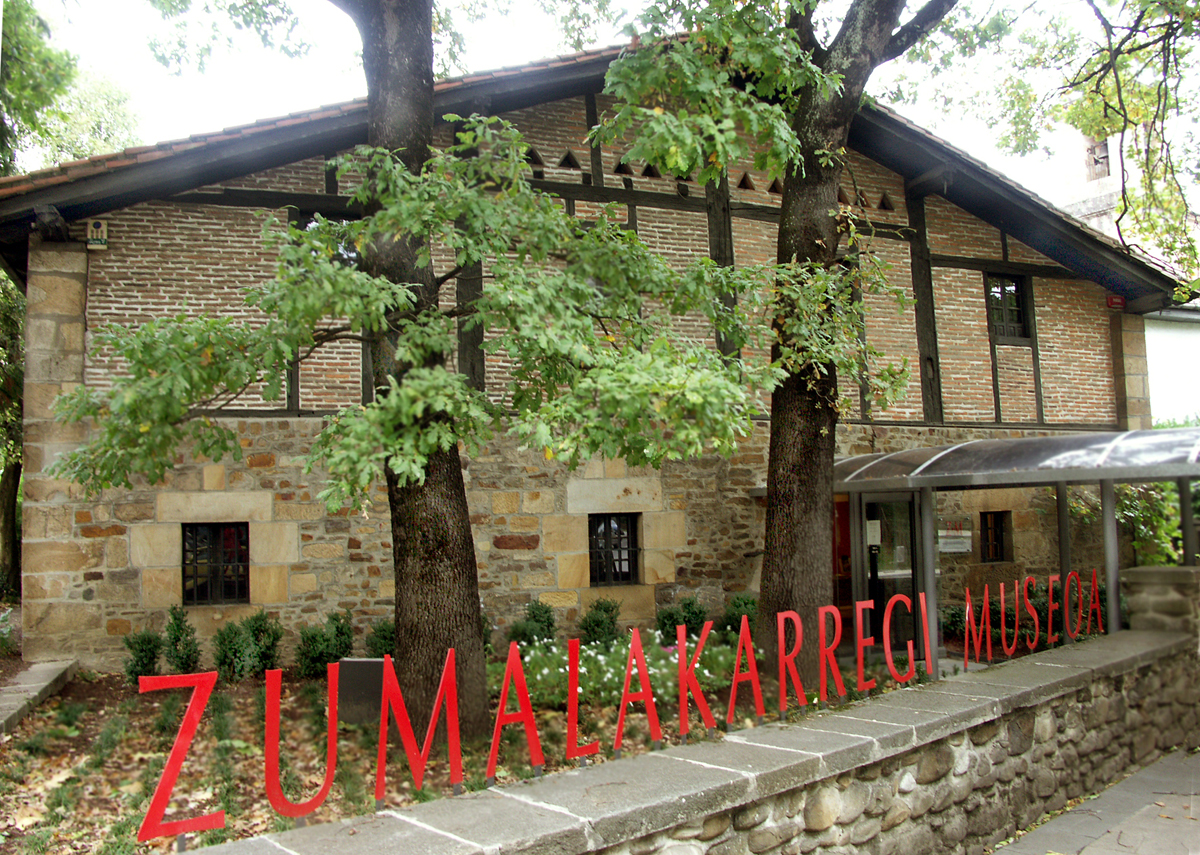
Zumalacárregui's birthplace-turned-museum in Ormaiztegi

When the Peninsular War began with a French invasion of Spain in 1808 he enlisted in Zaragoza. He served in the 1808 First Siege of Zaragoza, at the Battle of Tudela, and during the 1809 Second Siege of Zaragoza until he was taken prisoner in a sortie. He succeeded in escaping and in reaching his family in Navarre. For a short time he served with Gaspar de Jáuregui, another Gipuzkoan known as "The Shepherd" (Basque: Artzaia), one of the guerrilla leaders, who later became a general in the regular army against which Zumalacarregui fought.

But Zumalacárregui, who was noted for his grave and silent disposition and his strong religious principles, disliked the disorderly life of the guerrillas, and when regular forces were organized in the north he entered the 1st battalion of Gipuzkoa as an officer. During the remainder of the war he served in the regular army. His brother Miguel Antonio de Zumalacárregui was in Cádiz at the time the Cortes passed the Constitution of 1812, going on to be elected chief deputy of Gipuzkoa. Tomas was then sent with dispatches to the Regency at Cádiz, and received his commission as captain. In that rank he was present at the Battle of San Marcial in August 1813. After the restoration of Ferdinand VII he continued in the army, and is said to have made a careful study of the theory of war.

== During Ferdinand VII's rule ==
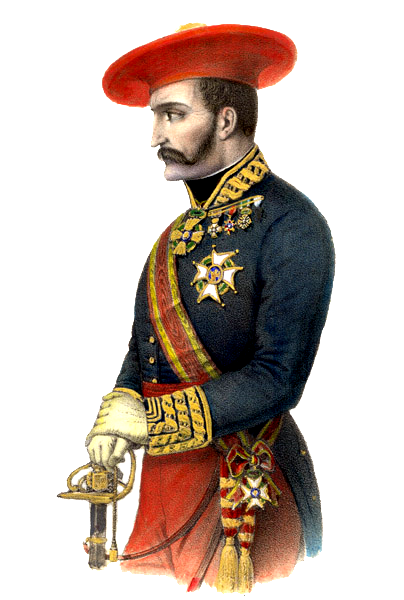
Posthumous portrait of Zumalacárregui dressed in uniform of Captain general of the Carlist Army, 1845

Zumalacárregui had no sympathy with the liberal principles which were spreading in Spain, and became noted as what was called a servil or strong Royalist. He attracted no attention at headquarters, and was still a captain when the Revolution of 1820 broke out and the Trienio Liberal was established. His brother officers, whose leanings were liberal, denounced him to the revolutionary government, and asked that he might be removed. The recommendation was not acted on, but Zumalacárregui knew of it, and laid up the offence in his mind. Finding that he was suspected (probably with truth) of an intention to bring the soldiers over to the royalist side, he escaped to France.

In 1823 he returned as an officer in one of the royalist regiments which had been organized on French soil by the consent of the government. He was now known as a thoroughly trustworthy servant of the royalty, but he was too proud to be a courtier. For some years he was employed in bringing regiments which the government distrusted to order. He became lieutenant-colonel in 1825 and colonel in 1829. In 1832 he was named military governor of Ferrol, Galicia. Before King Ferdinand VII died in 1833, Zumalacárregui was marked out as a natural supporter of the traditionalist party, which favoured the king's brother, Infante Carlos, Count of Molina.

== The Carlist War ==
The proclamation of the king's daughter Isabel as heiress was almost the occasion of an armed conflict between him and the naval authorities at Ferrol, who were partisans of the liberal and so-called "constitutional" cause. He was put on half pay by the new authorities and ordered to live under police observation at Pamplona in Navarre.

When the Carlist uprising began on the death of Ferdinand VII, he is said to have held back because he knew that the first leaders would be politicians and talkers. He did not take the field until the Carlist cause appeared to be at a very low ebb, and until he had received a commission from Don Carlos as Commander-in-Chief in Navarre.

He escaped Pamplona on the night of 29 October 1833 and took the command next day in the Araquil Valley. At that time the Carlist forces comprised no more than a few hundred ill-armed and dispirited guerrilleros; in a few months Zumalacárregui had organized them into a regular army. The difficulty he found in obtaining supplies was enormous, for the coast towns and notably Bilbao supported the "Cristino" (liberal) cause. It was mainly by seizing equipment from the government troops that he armed his forces. He gradually obtained full possession of the Southern Basque Country, outside of the fortresses, which he had not the means to besiege. He organized the forces known as aduaneros and the Guías de Navarra. His chief bodyguard, and later biographer, was Charles Frederick Henningsen.

Whether as a guerrilla leader, or as a general conducting regular war in the mountains, he proved unconquerable. He won the battles of Alsasua, Alegría de Álava, and Venta de Echavarri, for example, by employing guerrilla tactics.

By July 1834 he had made it safe for Don Carlos to join his headquarters. Zumalacárregui was by then strongly envied by the courtiers that surrounded the pretender, as well as by other military officers. Besides, Don Carlos was a somewhat naïve and easily suggestible man, and Zumalacárregui had therefore to drag behind him the whole weight of the distrust and intrigues of the court. Yet by the beginning of June 1835 he had made the Carlist cause triumphant to the north of the Ebro, and had formed an army of more than 30,000 men, of much better quality than the constitutional forces. He won the battle of Artaza (20–22 April 1835).

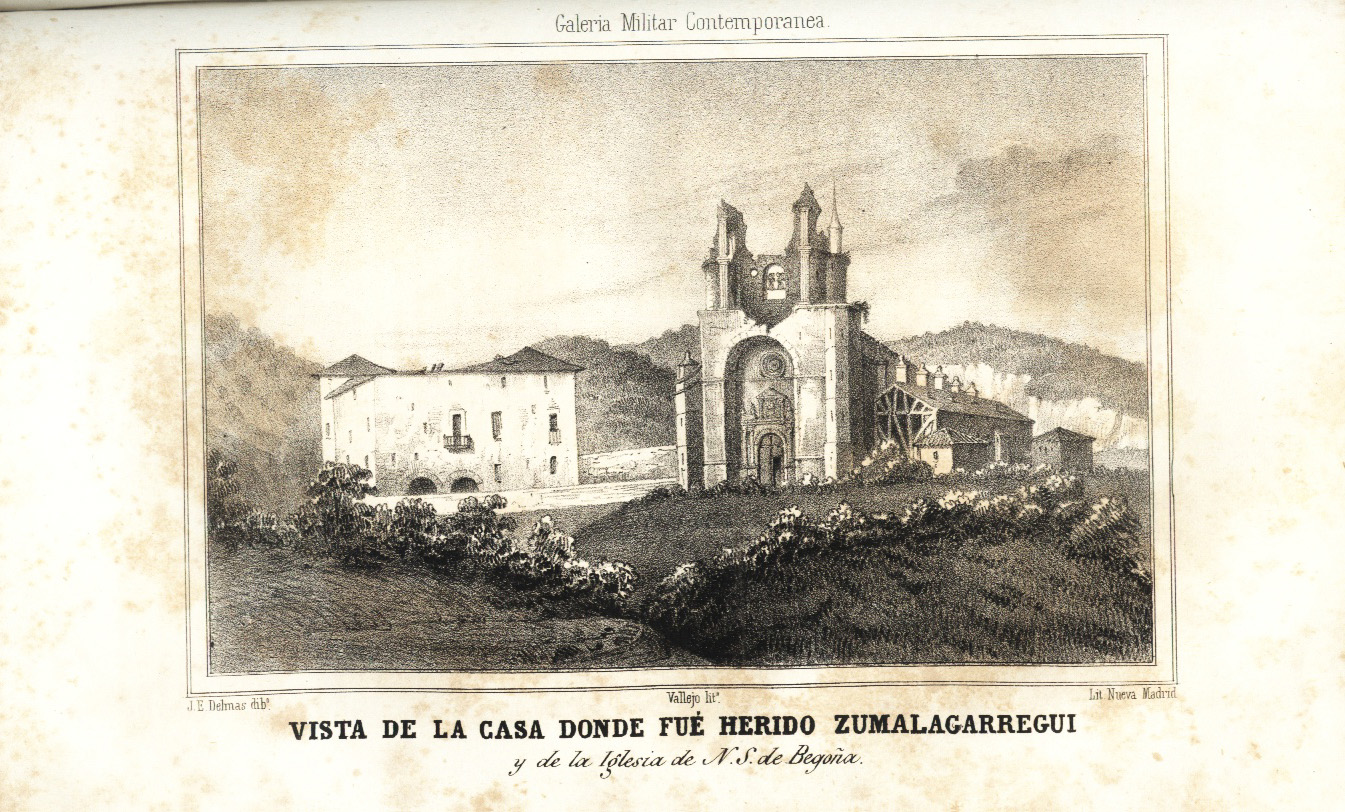
Location where Zumalacárregui suffered his fatal wound

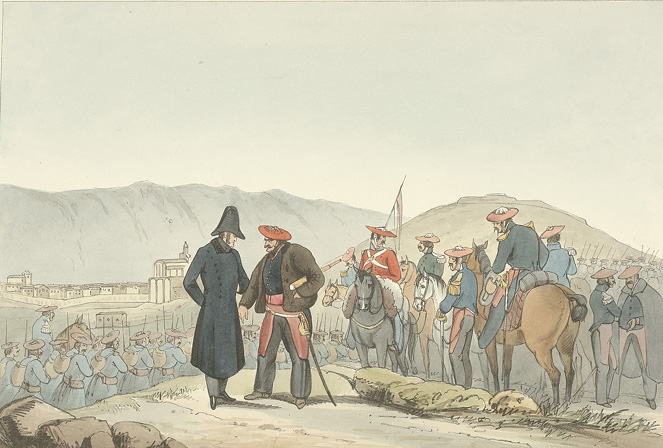
Zumalacárregui (right) in his distinctive Basque beret and brown pelisse, speaking to Don Carlos (left) during a battle, 1837

If Zumalacárregui had been allowed to follow his own plans, which were to concentrate his forces and march on Madrid, firstly seizing Logroño (La Rioja, Castile), he might well have put Don Carlos in possession of the capital. But the court was eager to obtain command of a seaport, because they thought this would facilitate the official recognition of Don Carlos as the legitimate heir to the Spanish Throne by other European courts. Thus, Zumalacárregui was ordered to besiege Bilbao. He obeyed reluctantly, and on 14 June 1835 was wounded in the calf by a musket shot, near the Basilica of Begoña. The wound was trifling and would probably have been cured with ease, but Zumalacárregui decided to employ a famous Gipuzkoan quack called "Petriquillo", whom he trusted. Petriquillo proceeded to remove the bullet from Zumalacárregui's leg, provoking a great loss of blood and probably an infection. Don Carlos had insisted on sending his own physicians, but they hesitated about the best prognosis to follow, losing precious time and failing to stop Petriquillo from trying his "procedure" (he acted when they were not present) and in their hands the general died on 24 June 1835, not without suspicion of poison and after Petriquillo had hastily left the scene.

Zumalacárregui is often popularly credited as the inventor of Spanish omelette (or tortilla de patatas), which he allegedly elaborated during the Siege of Bilbao, as a simple, fast and nutritious dish with which to satisfy the hardships of the Carlist Army. In search of nourishment, he came across a poor housewife who had nothing other than eggs, onion and potatoes. When he mixed it up, he liked the result and fed it to his starving troops. It is said that after this, the tortilla became incredibly popular throughout the rest of the First Carlist War, and is now one of the most renowned dishes in the world.

Zumalacárregui was a fine type of the old royalist and religious principles of his people. The Carlist forces under his command were repeatedly refused quarter by the government's forces (which for years didn't recognize them as legitimate combatants). The increasing ferocity of the war, substantiated in routine executions of Carlist soldiers and officers, convinced him of the necessity of a similar retaliation against the liberal forces. Zumalacárregui, however, would later sign the Lord Eliot Convention, shortly before his own death, which aimed to end the indiscriminate executions by firing squad of prisoners on both sides.

== Popularity ==
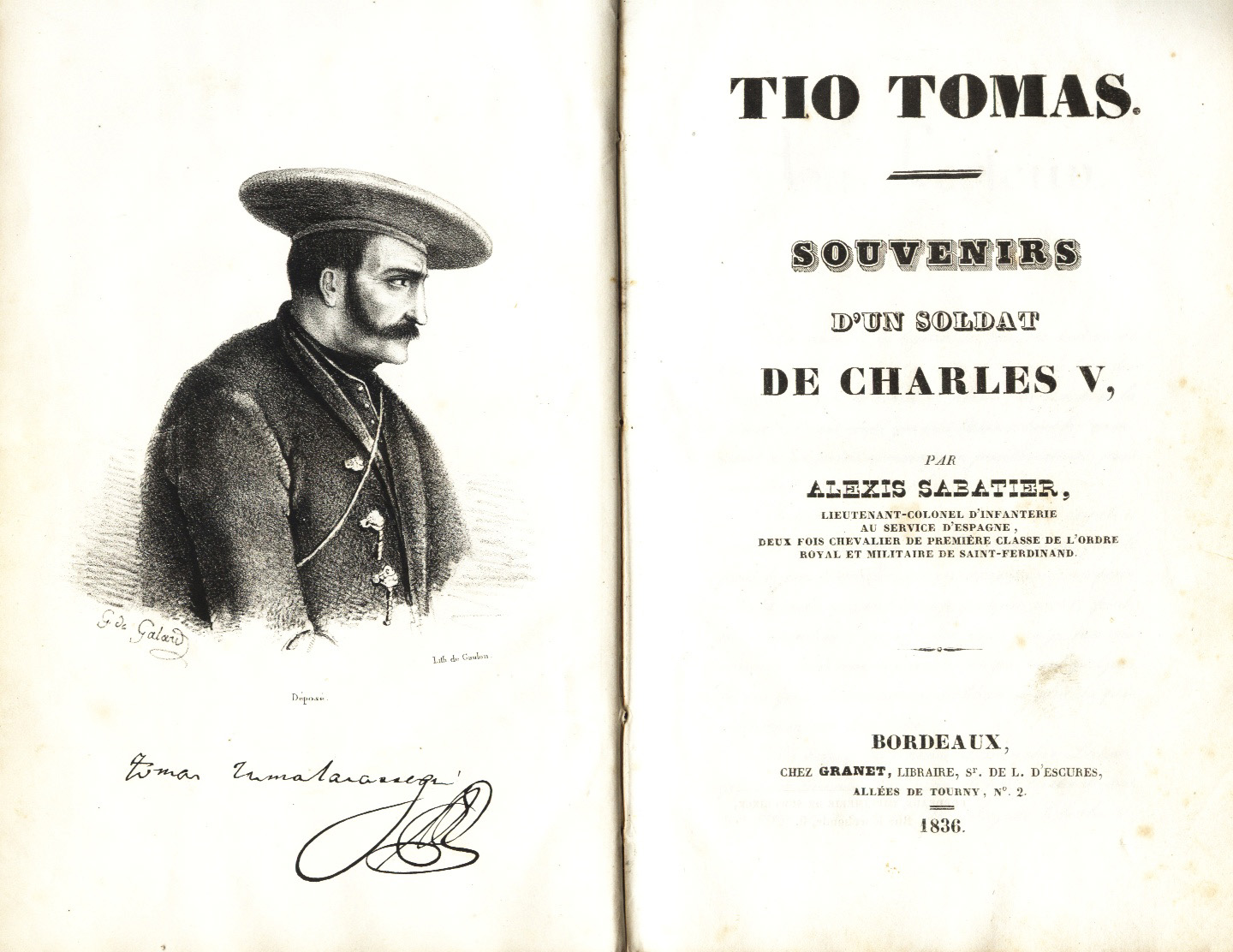
Tío Tomás, a book of memoirs of Zumalacárregui written by French author Alexis Sabater in 1836

The most trustworthy account of Zumalacarregui's Carlist campaign can be found in Juan Antonio de Zaratiegui's Vida y hechos de Don Tomás de Zumalacárregui. Zaratiegui was his personal assistant, secretary and friend throughout the war, and also himself an important carlist military officer. Accounts of Zumalacárregui include The Most Striking Events of a Twelvemonth Campaign with Zumalacarregui in Navarre and the Basque Provinces, by Charles Frederick Henningsen (London, 1836) as well as a chapbook called "Vida política y militar de Don Tomás Zumalacárregui". Of Zumalacárregui, Henningsen writes:

Now that Zumalacarregui's memory must descend, whatever be the issue of the contest, as an heir-loom to all classes of his countrymen, as long as the Spanish language endures, and that his name must be mingled in the songs of the peasantry with that of the Cid, it would be superfluous to say that he was no ordinary man; but, although, on the roll of those who have acquired a title to immortality, by the immense share he had in the early successes of the Royalist army, justice is scarcely done him. It is doubtless that it required the iron frame and indomitable spirit of the mountaineers he commanded, to battle so long against man, want, and the elements.

— Charles Frederick Henningsen,Twelve Months' Campaign with Zumalacárregui

In 2017 the People's Party of the Basque Country called for a street named after him to be renamed.

== Zumalacárregui in the Episodios nacionales ==
Zumalacárregui is the main character of an eponymous Episodio nacional, by Benito Pérez Galdós. He is portrayed as an intelligent man and an excellent strategist who fights for what he believes in.

== See also ==
- Basque fueros
- End of Basque home rule (Spain)
