= Arrieta =

- Municipality
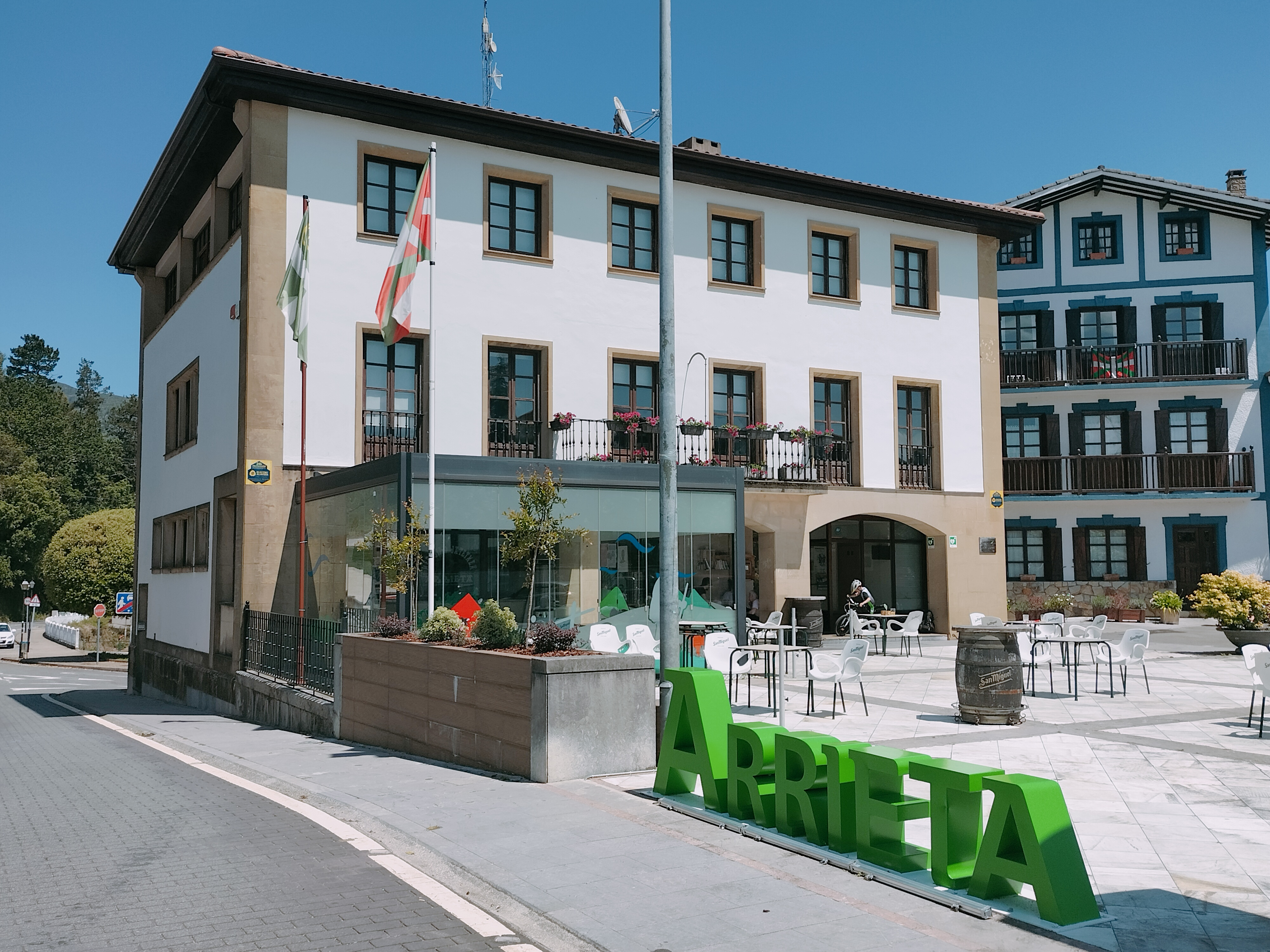
- Town hall

- Flag Coat of arms

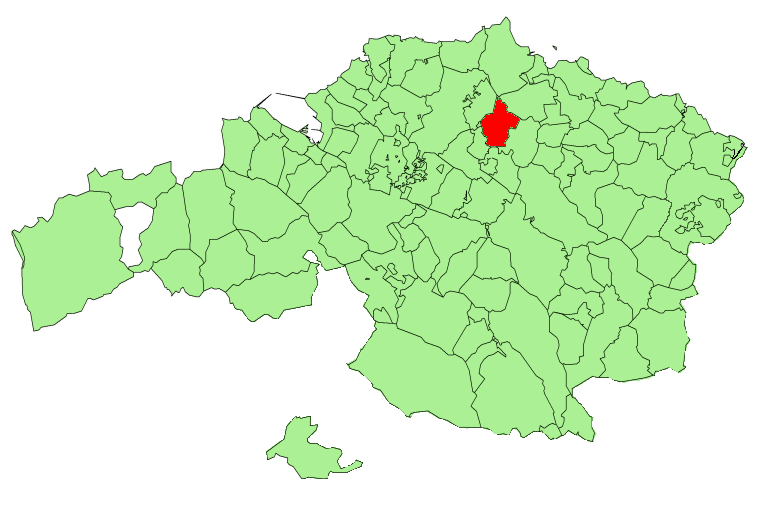
- Location of the municipality in Biscay.

- Location of Arrieta within the Basque Country Arrieta (Spain)
- Coordinates: 43°20′25″N 2°46′11″W
- Country: Spain
- Autonomous community: País Vasco
- Province: Biscay
- Comarca: Mungialdea
- Established: Not known

Government
  - Mayor: Ángel María Acillona (PNV-EAJ)

Area
  - Total: 14.47 km^{2} (5.59 sq mi)
- Elevation: 203 m (666 ft)

Population (2025-01-01)
  - Total: 582
  - Density: 40.2/km^{2} (104/sq mi)
- Time zone: UTC+1 (CET)
  - Summer (DST): UTC+2 (CEST)
- Postal code: 48114

Arrieta (both in Basque and Spanish) is a town and municipality located in the province of Biscay, in the Basque Country, Spain. Arrieta is part of the comarca of Mungialdea. It had a population of 552 inhabitants as of 2007, and a population of 564 inhabitants as of 2017.

== Toponym ==
This municipality has its origin in the elizate Líbano de Arrieta, which became a municipality in the 19th century. The toponym Arrieta comes from the Basque word harrieta, which means "stony place".

== Celebrities ==
- Santiago Arriaga y Arrien, Santiago de Jesús (1903–1936): was a priest of the Trinitarian Order. He was assassinated during the Spanish Civil war and beautified in 2007 by the Catholic Church.
- José Ramón Goyeneche Bilbao (1940): cyclist who participated in Tokyo Olympic Games in 1964.
