= Manuel Iturralde-Vinent =

Manuel A. Iturralde-Vinent
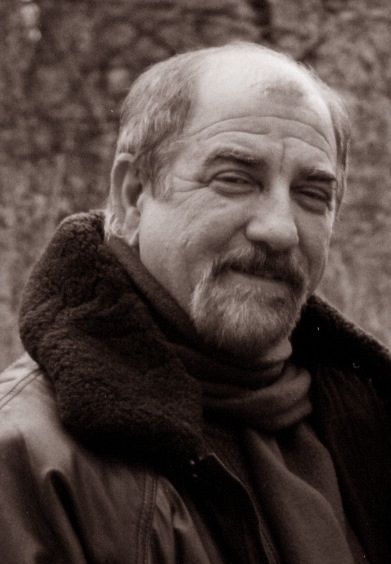
- Born: 10 July 1946 (age 80)
- Known for: Cuban and Caribbean geology
- Scientific career
- Fields: Paleontology, Geology Geohazards

Manuel A. Iturralde-Vinent (born Cienfuegos, 10 July 1946), is a Cuban geologist and paleontologist and former deputy director of the Cuban National Natural History Museum in Havana. He is a scientific personality in Cuba and the Caribbean and President of the Cuban Geological Society for 2007-2016.

He has conducted several studies on the Cuban and Caribbean geology, paleontology and caves, publishing a number of books and articles on the subject.

In the field of paleontology has been a prominent fossil hunter who shed light on Jurassic of Cuba with Argentinian researchers, especially Zulma Brandoni Gasparini, revising the taxonomy of Cuban species of marine reptiles and dinosaur. He made several discoveries in the field including Vinialesaurus carolii.

He has worked with the American Museum of Natural History to discover and excavate Miocene vertebrates at the paleontological site of Domo de Zaza and other localities in Cuba, Haiti, Dominican Republic, Jamaica and Puerto Rico. He also conducted studies on the Quaternary megafauna discovered in Cuba and various remains of terrestrial vertebrates such as sloths, rodents, birds, reptiles and other prehistoric animals. His work in paleontology, stratigraphy, biogeography, palaeogeography and plate tectonics are summarized in the Red Cubana de la Ciencia website.

For a full list of his books, articles in scientific journals, collaborations with scientists and other agencies, see List of scientific publications by Manuel Iturralde-Vinent or visit publications for an updated list.

== Scientific publications ==
- 2008. Iturralde-Vinent, M., C. Díaz Otero, A. García-Casco, D. van Hinsbergen, 2008. Paleogene Foredeep Basin Deposits of North-Central Cuba: A Record of Arc-Continent Collision between the Caribbean and North American Plates. International Geology Review: v. 50, n. 10, p. 863-884
- 2008. García-Casco, A., M. Iturralde-Vinent, J. Pindell, 2008. Latest Cretaceous Collision/Accretion between the Caribbean Plate and Caribeana: Origin of Metamorphic Terranes in the Greater Antilles. International Geology Review: v. 50, n. 9, p. 781-862
- 2008. Iturralde-Vinent, M.A. 2008. Sal si puedes y otras lecturas. Editorial Gente Nueva. La Habana.
- 2007. MacPhee, R.D.E., M. Iturralde-Vinent, O. Jiménez-Vázquez. 2007. Cuban Sloths: Implications of a new “last” occurrence date. Caribbean Journal of Science, 43(1):94-98.
- 2006. Iturralde-Vinent, M.A., 2006. Origen de la biota y los ecosistemas marinos de Cuba. 7 páginas. En R. Claro (Editor). La Biodiversidad Marina de Cuba. CDROM Instituto de Oceanología, CITMA. La obra en conjunto recibió Premio Academia 2007.
- 2006. Schweitzer, C. E., M. Iturralde-Vinent, J. L. Hetler, and J. Velez-Juarbe. 2006. Oligocene and Miocene decapods (Thalassinidea and Brachyura) from the Caribbean. Annals of Carnegie Museum, 75(2): 111-136.
- 2006. Iturralde-Vinent, M. A. 2006. Desastres de origen geológico: Causas y prevención. Boletín de la Sociedad Cubana de Geología 6(2):9-14.
- 2006. Iturralde-Vinent, M. A. 2006. Meso-Cenozoic Caribbean Paleogeography: Implications for the Historical Biogeography of the Region. International Geology Review 48(9):791-827.
- 2006. Iturralde-Vinent, M.A. 2006. La paleogeografía del Caribe y sus implicaciones para la biogeografía histórica. Rev. Jardín Botánico Nacional, XXV-XXVI: 49-78.
- 2006. Iturralde-Vinent, M.A. 2006. La buena ciencia siempre genera impactos. Revista del Parque Zoológico Nacional de Cuba “Cubazoo” 14: 53-54
- 2006. Gasparini, Z., Iturralde-Vinent, M., 2006. Cuban Jurassic Oxfordian Herpetofauna. N. Jb. Geol. Paläont., Abhandlungen, vol. 240 (3):343-371.
- 2006. Iturralde-Vinent, M.A. 2006. El Origen Paleogeográfico de la Biota de Guatemala. En: E. B. Cano, Biodiversidad de Guatemala, Vol. I, Publicado por Universidad del Valle de Guatemala, Guatemala, Guatemala, p. 1-6.
- 2006. Iturralde-Vinent, M.A. & E.G. Lidiak, Eds., 2006. Caribbean Plate Tectonics. Stratigraphy, Magmatic, Metamorphic and Tectonic Events. (UNESCO/IUGS IGCP Project 433). Geologica Acta 4(1-2):341 p.
- 2006. Iturralde-Vinent, M.A. & E.G. Lidiak, 2006. Foreword. Caribbean Tectonic, magmatic, metamorphic and stratigraphic events. Implications for Plate Tectonics. In Iturralde-Vinent, M.A. & E.G. Lidiak, Eds. Caribbean Plate Tectonics. Stratigraphy, Magmatic, Metamorphic and Tectonic Events. (UNESCO/IUGS IGCP Project 433). Geologica Acta 4(1-2):1-5. PDF
- 2006. García-Casco, A., R. Torres-Roldán, M.A. Iturralde-Vinent, G. Millán, K. Núñez-Cambra, C. Lázaro, A. Rodríguez-Vega. 2006. High pressure metamorphism of ophiolites in Cuba. In Iturralde-Vinent, M.A. & E.G. Lidiak, Eds. Caribbean Plate Tectonics. Stratigraphy, Magmatic, Metamorphic and Tectonic Events. (UNESCO/IUGS IGCP Project 433). Geologica Acta 4(1-2):63-88. PDF
- 2006. Iturralde-Vinent, M.A., C. Díaz-Otero, A. Rodríguez-Vega, R. Díaz-Martínez. 2006. In Iturralde-Vinent, M.A. & E.G. Lidiak, Eds. Caribbean Plate Tectonics. Stratigraphy, Magmatic, Metamorphic and Tectonic Events. (UNESCO/IUGS IGCP Project 433). Geologica Acta 4(1-2):89-102. PDF
- 2005. MacPhee, R.D.E. and Iturralde-Vinent, M., 2005. The Interpretation of Caribbean Paleogeography: Reply to Hedges. In Alcover, J.A. & Bover, P. (eds.). Proceedings of the International Symposium: Insular Vertebrate Evolution: The Paleontological Approach" Monografies de la Societat d'Historia Natural de les balears, 12, 175-184. PDF
- 2005. Rojas-Consuegra, R., M. A. Iturralde-Vinent, C. Díaz-Otero, D. García-Delgado, 2005. Significación paleogeográfica de la brecha basal del Límite K/T en Loma Dos Hermanas (Loma Capiro), en Santa Clara, provincia de Villa Clara. I Convención Cubana de Ciencias de la Tierra. GEOCIENCIAS1 2005. Memorias, Trabajos y Resúmenes. Centro Nacional de Información Geológica. IGP. La Habana. CD ROM. 2005. GEO08-P7: 1-9. ISBN 959-7117-03-7 Pick It! .
- 2004. González Ferrer, S. y M.A. Iturralde-Vinent, 2004. Breve historia natural de los corales y sus formaciones. En González Ferrer, S. (Editor). Corales Pétreos. Jardines Sumergidos de Cuba. Editorial Academia, La Habana. p. 65-69.
- 2004. Iturralde-Vinent, M.A. (Editor). Origen y evolución del Caribe y sus biotas marinas y terrestres. Editorial Centro Nacional de Información Geológica, CD-ROM. ISBN 959-7117-14-2 Pick It! .
- 2004. Jull, A., M. Iturralde-Vinent, J. O. Malley, R. MacPhee, H. McDonald, P. Martin, J. Moody, A. Rincón, 2004. Radiocarbon dating of extinct fauna in the Americas recovered from tar pits. Nuclear Instruments and Methods in Physics Research, B 223-224:668-671.
- 2004. Iturralde-Vinent, M., 2004. (Editor) Paleogeografía y Biogeografía de Cuba y el Caribe.[CD-ROM] Museo Nacional de Historia Natural, La Habana, Primera Edición Digital.
- 2004. Iturralde-Vinent, M. y R.D.E. MacPhee, 2004. Los mamíferos Terrestres en las Antillas Mayores. Su paleogeografía, biogeografía, irradiaciones y extinciones. Publicaciones de la Academia de Ciencias de la República Dominicana, Editora Buho, 30 p., Santo Domingo.
- 2004. Iturralde-Vinent, M., 2004. The conflicting paleontologic vs stratigraphic record of the formation of the Caribbean seaway. [CD-ROM and book] AAPG Memoire 79, Chapter 3:75-88.
- 2004. Tada, R., M. Iturralde-Vinent, T. Matsui, E. Tajika, T. Oji, K. Goto, Y. Nakano, H. Takayama, S. Yamamoto, S. Kiyokawa, K. Toyoda, D. García Delgado, C. Díaz-Otero, R. Rojas, 2004. K/T Boundary deposits in the Paleo-western Caribbean basin. [CD-ROM and book] AAPG Mem. 79. Chapter 26:582-604.
- 2003. Iturralde-Vinent, M., 2003. Ensayo sobre la paleogeografía del Cuaternario de Cuba. [CD ROM] V Congreso Cubano de Geología y Minería, ISBN 978-959-7117-11-7, 74 p. PDF
- 2003. García-Casco, A., Pérez de Arce, C., Millán, G., Iturralde-Vinent, M., Fonseca, E., Torres-Roldán, R., Núnez, K. and Morata, D. 2003. Metabasites from the Northern serpentinite belt (Cuba) and a metamorphic perspective of the plate tectonic models for the Caribbean region. [CD ROM] V Congreso Cubano de Geoúogía y Minería, ISBN 978-959-7117-11-7, 37 p.PDF
- 2003. Iturralde-Vinent, M., 2003. A brief account of the evolution of the Caribbean seaway: Jurassic to Present. In. Prothero, D., L. Ivany & E, Nesbitt (Ed.). From Greenhouse to Icehouse: The Marine Eocene-Oligocene Transition. Chapter 22, p. 386-396. Columbia University Press, New York. PDF
- 2003. MacPhee, R.D.E., M.A. Iturralde-Vinent, E. S. Gaffney. 2003. Domo de Zaza, an early Miocene vertebrate locality in south-central Cuba: with notes on the tectonic evolution of Puerto Rico and the Mona Passage. American Museum Novitates, (3394):42 p. PDF
- 2002. Iturralde-Vinent, M., L. Gahagan, 2002. Late Eocene to Middle Miocene Tectonic Evolution of the Caribbean: Some principles and their Implications for Plate Tectonic Modeling. In T.A. Jackson, ed., Caribbean Geology Into the Third Millennium. Transactions of the Fifteenth Caribbean Geological Conference. 47-62. Ed. Pear Tree Press Ltd., Jamaica. PDF
- 2002 Gasparini, Z., Bardet., N., Iturralde-Vinent, M. 2002. A new cryptoclidid plesiosaur from the upper Jurassic of Cuba. Geobios, 35(201): 211-217
- 2002 Tada, R., Y. Nakano, M.A. Iturralde-Vinent, S. Yamamoto, T. Kamada, E. Tajika, K. Toyoda, S. Kiyokawa, D. Garcia Delgado, T. Oji, K. Goto, H. Takayama, R. Rojas, T. Matsui, 2002. Complex tsunami waves suggested by the Cretaceous-Tertiary boundary deposit at the Moncada section, western Cuba. In Koeberl, C., and MacLeon, K.G., eds. Catastrophic events and mass extinctions: Impacts and Beyond: Boulder, Colorado, Geological Society of America, Special Paper 356, p. 109-123.
- 2002 Kiyokawa, S., R. Tada, M. Iturralde-Vinent, T. Matsui, K. Tajika, S. Yamamoto, T. Oji, T. Nakano, K. Goto, H. Takayama, D. Garcia, C. Díaz, R. Rojas, 2002. Cretaceous-Tertiary boundary sequence in the Cacarajicara Formation, western Cuba: An impact-related high-energy, gravity flow deposit. In Koeberl, C., and MacLeon, K.G., eds. Catastrophic events and mass extinctions: Impacts and Beyond. Geological Society of America Special Paper, (356):124-145.
- 2001 Iturralde-Vinent, M., 2001. The amber forest, a reconstruction of a vanished World. Journ. Geosc. Educ. 49(1):68-69.
- 2001 Iturralde-Vinent, M. A., and E. G. Lidiak, 2001, Caribbean plate tectonics (IGCP 433): Gondwana Research, v. 4, p. 247-248.
- 2001 Iturralde-Vinent, M. 2001. Geology of the Amber-bearing deposits of the Greater Antilles. Caribbean Journal of Sciences 37(3-4):141-167.PDF
- 2001 Gasparini, Z.B., M.A. Iturralde-Vinent, 2001. Metriorhynchid crocodiles (Crocodyliformes) from the Oxfordian of western Cuba. Neues Jahrbuch Geol. Paläont. Mon. (9): 534-542, Stuttgart.
- 2001 García-Delgado, D; R. Rojas-Consuegra; C. Díaz-Otero; R. Tada and M. Iturralde-Vinent (2001) Field trip guide to the Cretaceous-Tertiary Boundary in western Cuba. IV Congreso Cubano de Geología y Minería. GEOMIN ‘ 2000, La Habana, Marzo 17-18. 21pp.
- 2001 Díaz Otero, C.; M. Iturralde-Vinent and D.García Delgado (2000) Evidencias del "coctail" paleontologico del límite Cretacico-Terciario en Cuba occidental. Memorias IV Congreso Cubano de Geología y Minería, Geomin 2001. CD-ROMPDF
- 2001 De la Fuente, M. S., M. Iturralde-Vinent. 2001, A new pleurodiran turtle from the Jagua Formation (Oxfordian) of western Cuba. Journal of Paleontology, v. 75 (4), p. 860-869.
- 2001 Aventuras en el mundo de las tinieblas
- 2000 Takayama, H., R. Tada, T. Matsui, M. Iturralde-Vinent, T. Oji, E. Tajika, S. Kiyokawa, D. García, H. Okada, T. Hasegawa, K. Toyoda, 2000. Origin of the Peñalver Formation in northwestern Cuba and its relation to K/T boundary impact event. Sedimentary geology 135:295-320.
- 2000 Tada, R.; H. Takayama; T. Matsui; M. Iturralde-Vinent; T. Oji; E. Tajika; S. Kiyokawa; D. García; H. Okada; K. Toyoda; T. Hasegawa (2000) A Giant tsunami deposit at Cretaceous-Tertiary boundary in Cuba. Abstract of the Intern.Confer. on Catastrophic Events and Mass Extinctions: Impacts and Beyond. July 9–12, 2000. University of Viena, Austria. LPD Contribution No. 1053:226-227
- 2000 Nakano, Y; R. Tada; T. Kamata; E. Tajika; T. Oji; S. Kiyokawa; H. Takayama; K. Goto; S. Yamamoto; K. Toyoda; D. García; R. Rojas; M. A. Iturralde-Vinent and T. Matsui (2000) Complex tsunami waves suggested by the Cretaceous/Tertiary boundary deposit at Moncada section, western Cuba. (en prensa, se adjunta el manuscrito).
- 2000 Nakano, Y; R. Tada; T. Kamata; E. Tajika; T. Oji; S. Kiyokawa; H. Takayama; K. Goto; S. Yamamoto; K. Toyoda; D. García; R. Rojas; M. A. Iturralde-Vinent and T. Matsui (2000) Origen of cretaceous-tertiary boundary in Moncada, Western Cuba and its relation to K/T event. Abstract of the Intern.Confer. on Catastrophic Events and Mass Extinctions: Impacts and Beyond. July 9–12, 200. University of Viena, Austria. LPD Contribution No. 1053:148-149
- 2000 MacPhee, R.D.E. and Iturralde-Vinent, M.A. 2000. A short history of Greater Antillean land mammals: Biogeography, paleogeography, radiation, and extinctions. Tropics 10(1): 145-154.
- 2000 Kiyokawa, S.; R. Tada; T. T. Oji; E. Tajika; Y. Nakano; K. Goto; S. Yamamoto; R. Rojas; D. García; M. A. Iturralde-Vinent and T. Matsui (2000) More than 500m thick k/t boundary sequence; Cacarajicara Formation, Western Cuba. Impact related giant flow deposit. Abstract of the Intern.Confer. on Catastrophic Events and Mass Extinctions: Impacts and Beyond. July 9–12, 2000. University of Viena, Austria. LPD Contribution No. 1053:100-101
- 2000 Iturralde-Vinent, M.A., Stanek, K.P., Wolf, D., Thieke, H.U. and Müller, H. 2000. Geology of the Camagüey Region, Central Cuba- Evolution of a collisional margin in the Northern Caribbean. In Sonderheft ZAG SH 1: 267-273.
- 2000 Iturralde-Vinent, M., R.D.E. MacPhee, S. Diaz-Franco, R. Rojas-Consuegra, W. Suárez, A. Lomba, 2000. Las Breas de San Felipe, a Quaternary fossiliferous asphalt seep near Martí (Matanzas province, Cuba). Caribbean Journal of Science, (3-4):300-313. pdf
- 2000 Iturralde-Vinent, M. and L. Gahagan, 2000. Caribbean Plate tectonic models: Discrepancies and Similarities. Power Point Presentation. Web Page of the Institute for Geophysics of the University of Texas at Austin (www.ig.utexas.edu/CaribPlate/Forum)
- 2000 Iturralde-Vinent, M. 1998. Sinópsis de la constitución geológica de Cuba. Acta Geológica Hispánica, 33(1-4):9-56 (publicada en Marzo del 2000). pdf
- 2000 Iturralde-Vinent, M., D. García-Delgado, C. Díaz-Otero, R. Rojas-Consuegra, R. Tada, H. Takayama, S. Kiyokawa (2000) The K/T Boundary Impact layer in Cuba: Update of an International Project. Abstract of the Intern.Confer. on Catastrophic Events and Mass Extinctions: Impacts and Beyond. July 9–12 (2000) University of Viena, Austria. LPD Contribution No. 1053:76-77
- 2000 Fernández, M., M. Iturralde-Vinent, 2000. An Oxfordian ichthyosauria (Reptilia) from Viñales, Western Cuba: paleobiogeographic significance. Journal of Vertebrate Paleontology, 20(1):191-193.
- 2000 Díaz Otero, C.; M. Iturralde-Vinent and D.García Delgado (2000) The Cretaceous-Tertiary boundary "cocktail" in Western Cuba, Greater Antilles. Abstract of the Intern. Confer. on Catastrophic Events and Mass Extinctions: Impacts and Beyond. July 9–12, 200. University of Viena, Austria. LPD Contribution No. 1053:37
- 1999. Kerr, A., M. Iturralde-Vinent, A. Saunders, T. Babbs and J. Tarney. A geochemical recognaissance of Cuban Mesozoic volcanic rocks: implications for plate tectonics models of the Caribbean. Geological Society of America Bull. 111(11)1581-1599.
- 1999. Iturralde-Vinent, M., R.D.E. MacPhee, S. Díaz and R. Rojas. A small "Rancho La Brea" site discovered in Cuba. The Journal of the Geol. Soc. Jamaica, 33:20.
- 1999. Iturralde-Vinent, M., R. MacPhee. Paleogeography of the Caribbean region, implications for Cenozoic biogeography. Bull. Amer. Mus. Nat. Hist. 238:1-95
- 1998. Iturralde-Vinent, M., Late Paleocene to early middle Eocene Cuban island arc. in Ali, W., A. Paul and V. Young On, (Eds.)1998. Transactions of the 3rd Geological Conference of the Geological Society of Trinidad and Tobago and the 14th Caribbean Geological Conference, Volume 2: 343-362.
- 1998. Iturralde-Vinent, M., C. Laurito Mora, R. Rojas, M.R. Gutierrez, 1998. Myliobatidae (Elasmobranchii: Batomorphii) del Terciario de Cuba. Revista de la Sociedad Mexicana de Paleontología 8(2):135-145. (Figuras y texto)
- 1998. Iturralde-Vinent, M., 1998. Miocene Amber and Lignitic Deposits in Puerto Rico. Caribbean Journal of Sciences 34(3-4): 308-312PDF
- 1998. Iturralde-Vinent, M. y M. Cabrera Castellanos. 1998. Estratigrafía de los Cayos del Archipiélago Sabana-Camagüey entre Ciego de Avila y Las Tunas. Sociedad Cubana de Geología, 1998a. Memórias Geología y Minería’98, III Congreso Cubano de Geología y Minería, Marzo 24-27, Palacio de las Convenciones de La Habana, Tomo I, pp. 319–322.
- 1998. Iturralde-Vinent, M. 1998. El Programa "GEOSITE" de la UNESCO-IUGS para la conservación de la herencia geológica. Memórias Geología y Minería’98, III Congreso Cubano de Geología y Minería, Marzo 24-27, Palacio de las Convenciones de La Habana, Tomo I, pp. 323–325.
- 1998. Iturralde-Vinent, M. 1998. Book Review: Jamaica Underground. The Caves, sinkholes and Underground rivers of the Island. Caribbean Journal of Sciences 34(3-4):
- 1998. Iturralde-Vinent, M. 1997. Introducción a la geología de Cuba en Furrazola Bermúdez, G. y K. Núñez Cambra. Estudios sobre geología de Cuba, Instituto de Geología y Paleontología, p. 35-68, La Habana (publicado en marzo de 1998)
- 1998. Iturralde-Vinent, M., G. R. Case. First Report of The Fossil Fish Diodon (Family Diodontidae) from the Miocene of úuba. </úpan>Revista de la Sociedad Mexicana de Paleontología 8(2):123-126. (Figuras y texto)
- 1998. Gasparini, Z., M. Fernández, M. Iturralde-Vinent, 1998. Los reptiles marinos jurásicos como evidencia del corredor Caribeño. Sociedad Cubana de Geología, Memorias, Geología y Minería ‘98, Reunión del Proyecto PICG/UNESCO 364. Tomo II, pp. 295–297, La Habana
- 1998. Echevarría, B. y Núñez Cambra, K. (Ed.) 1998. Guía de Campo, Santa Clara, Cuba Central, Marzo 28 y 29 de 1998. IGCP Project 364, 36 p. (Co-autor de varias secciones)
- 1997 Iturralde-Vinent, M., 1997. Ophiolites and Volcanic Arcs in Eastern Cuba, Journal of Petroleum Geology 20(2): 250-251
- 1997 Iturralde-Vinent, M., 1997. Meeting Reports: Stratigraphy and Correlation of Cretaceous Volcanic arc rocks, Dominican Republic (IGCP-364) July, 1997. Journal of Petroleum Geology 20(4):489-491
- 1997 Díaz Otero, C., G. Furrazola Bermúdez, M. Iturralde-Vinent, 1997. Estratigrafía de la zona de Remedios, en Furrazola Bermúdez, G. y K. Núñez Cambra. Estudios sobre geología de Cuba, Instituto de Geología y Paleontología, p. 221-242, La Habana (publicado en marzo de 1998)
- 1997 Bralower, T., M. Iturralde-Vinent, 1997. Micropaleontological dating of the collision between the North American continental margin and the Greater Antilles Volcanic Arc in Western Cuba. PALAIOS 12:133-150.
- 1996 Rojas, R., M. Iturralde-Vinent, P. Skelton. 1996. Age, stratigraphic position and composition of Cuban rudist faunas. Revista Mexicana de Ciencias Geológicas Vol. 12, No. 2, pag. 272-291. pdf
- 1996 Rojas, R., M. Iturralde-Vinent 1996. Checklist of Cuban rudist taxa. Revista Mexicana de Ciencias Geológicas 12(2): 272-273
- 1996 Iturralde-Vinent, M., R. MacPhee, 1996. Age and paleogeographic origin of Dominican Amber. Science No. 273 p. 2750-2752.
- 1996 Iturralde-Vinent, M., G. Millán, L. Korpas, E. Nagy, J. Pajón 1996. Geological Interpretation of the Cuban K-Ar Database en: Ofiolitas y arcos volcánicos de Cuba, 48-69.
- 1996 Iturralde-Vinent, M., G. Hubbell, R. Rojas, 1996. Catalogue of Cuban fossil Elasmobranchii (Paleocene to Pliocene) and paleogeographic implications of their Lower to Middle Miocene occurrence, Boletín de la Sociedad Jamaicana de Geología, vol. 31, p. 7-21. (Figuras y texto)
- 1996 Iturralde-Vinent, M., G. Giunta, 1995. Geological transect of ophiolites in Northern Venezuela and Central Cuba. Conference reports, Geoscience and Development 3: 31.
- 1996 Iturralde-Vinent, M. y M. Norell, 1966. Synopsis of Late Jurassic Marine reptiles from Cuba. AM Novitates No. 3164, 17 p.
- 1996 Iturralde-Vinent, M. 1996. Prefacio en: Ofiolitas y arcos volcánicos de Cuba, iii-vii.
- 1996 Iturralde-Vinent, M. 1996. Magmatismo de margen continental de Cuba en: Ofiolitas y arcos volcánicos de Cuba, 121-130.
- 1996 Iturralde-Vinent, M. 1996. Introduction to Cuban Geology and Geophysics en: Ofiolitas y arcos volcánicos de Cuba, 3-35.
- 1996 Iturralde-Vinent, M. 1996. Implicaciones tectónicas del magmatismo de margen continental de Cuba y la cuenca del Caribe. Revista de la Sociedad Argentina de Geología, número especial.
- 1996 Iturralde-Vinent, M. 1996. Geología de las ofiolitas de Cuba en: Ofiolitas y arcos volcánicos de Cuba, 83-120
- 1996 Iturralde-Vinent, M. 1996. Estratigrafía del arco volcánico en Cuba en: Ofiolitas y arcos volcánicos de Cuba, 190-227.
- 1996 Iturralde-Vinent, M. 1996. Cuencas sedimentarias del Paleoceno-Eoceno de Cuba Boletín de la Sociedad Venezolana de Geología, # 1-2, p. 75-80.
- 1996 Iturralde-Vinent, M. 1996. Cuba: El arco de islas volcánicas del Cretácico en: Ofiolitas y arcos volcánicos de Cuba, 179-189
- 1996 Iturralde-Vinent, M. 1996. Cuba: El archipiélago volcánico Paleoceno-Eoceno en: Ofiolitas y arcos volcánicos de Cuba, 231-246.
- 1996 Iturralde-Vinent, M. (Editor) 1996: Ofiolitas y arcos volcánicos de Cuba: First Contribution IGCP Project 364: 265 p.
- 1996 Beccaluva, L., M. Coltorti, G. Giunta, M. Iturralde-Vinent, E. Navarro, F. Siena, F. Urbani, 1996. Cross sections through the ophiolitic units of the southern and northern margins of the caribbean Plate in Venezuela (Northern Cordilleras) and Central Cuba. Ofioliti 21(2):85-104
- 1995 Rojas, R., M. Iturralde-Vinent, 1995. Colecciones paleontológicas cubanas; contenido y estado actual. Memória III Reunión Nacional de Colecciones Paleontológicas, Sociedad Mexicana de Paleontología p. 21-23.
- 1995 MacPhee, R., M. Iturralde-Vinent, 1995. Origin of the Greater Antilles Land Mammal Fauna, 1: New Tertiary Fossils from Cuba and Puerto Rico: AMNH Novitates, 3141, 31 p.
- 1995 MacPhee, R., M. Iturralde-Vinent, 1995. Earliest monkey from Greater Antilles. Journal of Human Evolution 28: 197-200
- 1995 Iturralde-Vinent, M. 1995. Meeting report: Caribbean ophiolites and volcanic arcs: Jamaica, October 1994: Journal of Petroleum Geology 18 (2): 234-235.
- 1995 Iturralde-Vinent, M. 1995. Field Guide. Sedimentary Geology of Western Cuba. 1st SEPM Congress on Sedimentary geology, St. Pete Beach, Florida, 21 p.
- 1995 Iturralde-Vinent, M. 1995. Cuencas sedimentarias del Paleoceno-Eoceno de Cuba. Bol. Soc. Venezolana de Geól. 20(1-2):75-80.
- 1995 Beccaluva, L., M. Coltorti, G. Giunta, M. Iturralde-Vinent, E. Navarro, F. Siena, F. Urbani, 1995. Cross sections through the ophiolitic units of the southern and northern margins of the Caribbean Plate in Venezuela (Northern Cordilleras) and Central Cuba. First Italian-Latin American Geological Meeting, Venezuela-Cuba, January 9–16, 1995, 31 pag.
- 1994 MacPhee, R., M. Iturralde-Vinent, 1994. First Tertiary Land Mammal from Greater Antilles: An Early Miocene Sloth (Xenarthra, Megalonychidae) From Cuba: AMNH Novitates, 3094, 13 p .
- 1994 Iturralde-Vinent, M., M.R. Gutierrez Domech, 1994. Cuban Tropical Karst: Some examples. AGID News 76: 9-12.
- 1994 Iturralde-Vinent, M. 1994. Meeting reports: Tectonostratigraphic correlation of the NW Caribbean: Dominican Republic. Journal of Petroleum Geology 17, 2, 243-245.
- 1994 Iturralde-Vinent, M. 1994. Interrelationship of the terranes in western and central Cuba—Comments Tectonophysics 234: 345-348
- 1994 Iturralde-Vinent, M., 1994. Cuban Geology: A new plate tectonic synthesis: Journal of Petroleum Geology, 17 (1): 39-71.
- 1993 Luperto Sinni, E. & M. Iturralde-Vinent, 1993. Lower Cretaceous algae from a Cuban carbonate platform sequence: Studies on Fossil Benthic Algae. F. Barattolo et al. (eds.). Boll. Soc. Paleont. Ital., Spec. Vol. 1, Mucchi, Modena, 1993: 281-285.
- 1992 Iturralde-Vinent, M. 1992. A short note on the Cuban late Maastrichtian megaturbidite (an impact-derived deposit?): Earth & Planetary Science Letters, 109: 225-228.
- 1991 Iturralde-Vinent, M. 1991. Deslizamientos y descensos del terreno en el flanco meridional de la Sierra Maestra, Cuba sudoriental: En Morfotectónica de Cuba Oriental, Inst. de Geografía, ACC, p. 24-27.
- 1990 Iturralde-Vinent, M. 1990. Las ofiolitas en la constitución geológica de Cuba. Rev. Ciencias de la Tierra y del Espacio (17):8-26.
- 1990 Iturralde-Vinent, M. & A. de la Torre, 1990. Posición estratigráfica de los rudistas de Camagüey, Cuba. Transactions 12th Caribbean Geological Conference, Miami Geological Society, USA, p. 59-67.
- 1990 Gutierrez, R. & M. Iturralde-Vinent, 1990. Condiciones geológicas de formación del carso en Cuba. Programa y Resúmenes, Congreso Internacional 50 Aniversario Sociedad Espeleológica de Cuba. p. 86. La Habana.
- 1989 Vinardell, I., E. Alvarez, M. Iturralde-Vinent, R. Fagundo, 1989. Aplicación de la computación a la obtención de criterios para la prospección geoquímica. Resúmenes Primer Congreso Cubano de Geología, p. 166.
- 1989 Pushcharovsky, Yu., A. Mossakovsky, G. Nekrasov, S. Sokolov, M. Iturralde-Vinent et al. 1989. Tectonic map of Cuba scale 1:500 000, 4 sheets. Academy of Sciences of Cuba and URSS, Moscow.
- 1989 Pushcharovsky, Yu., A. Mossakovsky, G. Nekrasov, S. Sokolov, M. Iturralde-Vinent, et al. 1989. Tectonic of the Republic of Cuba:Explanatory note to the Tectonic map of Cuba 1:500 000. Ed. Nauka, Moscow (Russian/English), 77 p.
- 1989 Iturralde-Vinent, M. 1989.Mapa geológico de Camagüey escala 1:500 000. Atlas Regional de Camagüey. Academia de Ciencias de Cuba, La Habana.
- 1989 Iturralde-Vinent, M. 1989. Rol de las ofiolitas en la constitución geológica de Cuba (Russian/English). Geotectonics (4):63-76. Moscow.
- 1989 Iturralde-Vinent, M. 1989. Mapa Tectónico de Camagüey escala 1:500 000. Atlas Regional de Camagüey. Academia de Ciencias de Cuba. La Habana.
- 1989 Iturralde-Vinent, M. & R. Fagundo, 1989. Experiencias en la prospección hidrogeoquímica en el territorio camagüeyano, Cuba central. Resúmenes Primer Congreso Cubano de Geología, La Habana, p. 164.
- 1988 Pushcharovsky, Yu. et al.(ed.). 1988 Mapa geológico de la República de Cuba escala 1:250 000 (42 sheets), Academy of Sciencies of Cuba, USSR, etc.(M. Iturralde-Vinent as coauthor).
- 1988 Iturralde-Vinent, M. 1988. Naturaleza Geológica de Cuba. Editorial Científico-Técnica, 246 p. La Habana.
- 1988 Iturralde-Vinent, M. 1988. Consideraciones generales sobre el magmatismo de margen continental de Cuba. Rev. Tecnológica XVIII(4):17-24.
- 1988 Iturralde-Vinent, M. 1988. Composición y edad de los depósitos del fondo oceánico (asociación ofiolítica) del Mesozoico de Cuba, en el ejemplo de Camagüey. Rev. Tecnológica XVIII(3):13-24.
- 1988 Iturralde-Vinent, M. & T. Marí Morales, 1988. Toleitas del Tithoniano de la Sierra de Camaján, Camagüey: Posible datación de la corteza oceánica. Revista Tecnológica XVIII(1): 25-32.
- 1988 Formell, F., et al. (M. Iturralde-Vinent). 1988. Mapa tectónico de Cuba escala 1:1 000 000. Nuevo Atlas Nacional de Cuba. Academia de Ciencias de Cuba, La Habana.
- 1988 Díaz, J., et al. (M. Iturralde-Vinent). 1988. Mapa geomorfológico de Cuba escala 1: 1 000 000. Nuevo Atlas Nacional de Cuba. Academia de Ciencias de Cuba, La Habana.
- 1987 Mishekurina, E. & M. Iturralde-Vinent, 1987. Experiencias sobre la localización de aureolas secundarias de oro mediante la mineralogía de jagua. Serie Geológica del CIDP, Min. Ind. Básica, 1:89-103.
- 1987 Iturralde-Vinent, M., H.U. Thieke, et al. 1987. Informe sobre los resultados del levantamiento geológico y de las búsquedas acompañantes en el Polígoco Cuba-RDA (unpublished report) Ministry of Basic Industry files, La Habana.
- 1987 Iturralde-Vinent, M., A. De la Torre & M. Quintana, 1987. Rocas magnesianas sedimentarias en el Mioceno de Camagüey. Métodos de prospección: Revista Tecnológica XVIII (3): 4-9.
- 1987 Brezsnyánszky, K. M. Iturralde-Vinent 1987. On two Tertiary tectonic phases in Cuba: in: Yu. Leonov & V.E. Khain (eds.) Global Correlation of Tectonic movements, John Wiley & Sons, p. 227-230.
- 1986 Iturralde-Vinent, M., R. Hartwich et al. 1986. Ofiolitas de Camagüey, Cuba: Naturaleza, posición tectónica y sedimentos derivados. Rev. Tecnológica, Serie Geológica (2):29-32.
- 1986 Iturralde-Vinent, M. 1986. Reconstrucción palinspástica y paleogeografía del Cretácico Inferior de Cuba oriental y territorios vecinos. Rev. Minería y Geología (1):1-14, Instituto Superior Minero-Metalúrgico de Moa, Cuba.
- 1986 Fagundo, R. y M. Iturralde-Vinent, 1986. Características geoquímicas de algunas aguas del polígono Gaspar y su relación con la geología. Resúmenes Jornada Científico-Técnica XXV Aniv, Serv. Geol. Nacional, p. 2.
- 1986 Alvarez, E., I. Vinardell, R. Fagundo y M. Iturralde-Vinent, 1986. Aplicación de la computación a la obtención de criterios para la prospección geoquímica: Jornada Científico-Técnica XXV Aniv, Serv. Geol. Nacional, p. 46.
- 1985 Iturralde-Vinent, M., F. Albear & J. Sanchez Arango, 1985. Formación Rosario, redescripción. y estudio micropaleontológico. Contribución a la Geología de las provincias de La Habana y Ciudad de La Habana, Editorial Científico-Técnica, La Habana, p. 59-67.
- 1985 Iturralde-Vinent, M. 1985. Historia geológica del Mesozoico de las provincias de La Habana. Contribución a la Geología de las provincias de La Habana y Ciudad de La Habana, Editorial Científico-Técnica, La Habana, p. 94-99.
- 1985 Iturralde-Vinent, M. 1985. Evaluación ingeniero-geológica del territorio de las provincias de La Habana. Contribución a la Geología de las provincias de La Habana y Ciudad de La Habana, Ed. Cient.-Técnica, La Habana, p. 135-150.
- 1985 Iturralde-Vinent, M. 1985. Algunos aspectos geomorfológicos de La Habana. Contribución a la Geología de las provincias de La Habana y Ciudad de La Habana, Editorial Científico-Técnica, La Habana, p. 5-11.
- 1985 Bresznyánszky, K. & M. Iturralde-Vinent, 1985. Paleogeografía del Paleógeno de las provincias de La Habana. Contribución a la Geología de las provincias de La Habana y Ciudad de La Habana, Editorial Científico-Técnica, La Habana, p. 100-115.
- 1985 Albear, J. & M. Iturralde-Vinent, 1985. Zonación estructuro-facial de las provincias de La Habana. Contribución a la Geología de las provincias de La Habana y Ciudad de La Habana, Editorial Científico-Técnica, La Habana, p. 68-76.
- 1985 Albear, J. & M. Iturralde-Vinent, 1985. Posición tectonica del complejo gabro-peridotítico de las provincias de La Habana. Contribución a la Geología de las provincias de La Habana y Ciudad de La Habana, Editorial Científico-Técnica, La Habana, p. 87-93.
- 1985 Albear, J. & M. Iturralde-Vinent, 1985. Pisos estructurales en el territorio de las provincias de La Habana. Contribución a la Geología de las provincias de La Habana y Ciudad de La Habana, Editorial Científico-Técnica, La Habana, p. 77-86.
- 1985 Albear, J. & M. Iturralde-Vinent, 1985. Estratigrafía de las provincias de La Habana. Contribución a la Geología de las provincias de La Habana y Ciudad de La Habana, Editorial Científico-Técnica, La Habana, p. 12-54.
- 1984 Núñez Jiménez, A., N. Viña, M. Acevedo, J. Mateo, M. Iturralde-Vinent, A. Grañas, 1984 (second edition 1990), Cuevas y Carsos. Edit. Científico-Técnica 431 p. La Habana.
- 1984 Iturralde-Vinent, M., A. de la Torre, M. Quintana y R. Morell, 1984. Magnesitas sedimentarias en el Mioceno de Camagúey: Resúmenes X Jornada Científica del Instituto de Geología y Paleontología, p. 86.
- 1983 Iturralde-Vinent, M. y F. Perez, 1983. La cartografía geomorfológica como método de búsqueda de yacimientos minerales: Resúmenes VII Jornada Científica de los Profesores del Inst. Pedagógico J. Martí, p. 37.
- 1983 Bresznyanszky, K. & M. Iturralde-Vinent, 1983. Paleogeografía del Paleógeno de Cuba Oriental. en Nagy, et al. 1983. Contribución a la Geología de Cuba Oriental. Editorial Científico-Técnica, p. 115-126. La Habana.
- 1982 Roque Marrero, F. & M. Iturralde-Vinent, 1982. Nuevos datos sobre las estructuras diapíricas de Punta Alegre y Turiguanó, Ciego de Avila. Rev. Ciencias de la Tierra y del Espacio (4): 47-55
- 1982 Iturralde-Vinent, M. 1982. Posibilidades gasopetrolíferas de Camagüey (unpublished report). 30 p. (Ministry of Basic Industry files).La Habana.
- 1982 Iturralde-Vinent, M. 1982. Aspectos geológicos de la biogeografía de Cuba. Rev. Ciencias de la Tierra y del Espacio (5):85-100.
- 1982 Iturralde-Vinent, M. & F. Roque Marrero, 1982. La falla Cubitas: su edad y desplazamientos. Rev. Ciencias de la Tierra y del Espacio (4):47-70.
- 1981 Iturralde-Vinent, M., D. Tchounev, R. Cabrera et al. 1981. Geología del territorio de Ciego-Camagüey-Las Tunas:Resultados de las investigaciones científicas y del levantamiento geológico escala 1:250 000. Academias de Ciencias de Cuba y Bulgaria. 940 p. and maps. (unpublished report). Ministry of Basin Industries files.La Habana.
- 1981 Iturralde-Vinent, M. 1981. Nuevo modelo interpretativo de la evolución geológica de Cuba. Rev. Ciencias de la Tierra y del Espacio (3):51-90.
- 1981 Iturralde-Vinent, M. 1981. An Expanding Earth model explanation for the origin and evolution of Cuba. in S.W. Carey(ed.) 1981. The Expanding Earth. A Symposium. Australia, p. 215-218.
- 1981 Díaz, C. & M. Iturralde-Vinent, 1981. Estratigrafía, paleontología y paleogeografía del banco carbonatado Cretácico de Sierra de Cubitas. Resúmenes Primera Jornada Científica de la Sociedad Cubana de Geología, p. 51-52.(also unpublished report of Instituto de Geología y Paleontología).
- 1979 Iturralde-Vinent, M. 1979 Tectónica de la etapa postgeosinclinal de Cuba(Russian/English). Geotectonics (4):63-76, Moscow.
- 1978 Iturralde-Vinent, M. 1978. Los movimientos tectónicos de la etapa de desarrollo platafórmico de Cuba. Geologie en Mijnbow 57 (2):205-212 Holand.
- 1978 Bresznyanszky, K. & M. Iturralde-Vinent,1978. Paleogeografía del Paleógeno de Cuba oriental: Geologie en Mijnbow 57(2):123-133. Holand.
- 1977 Iturralde-Vinent, M. 1977. Reconocimiento preliminar del carso del macizo de Bayate, Holguín. Rev. Voluntad Hidráulica (41):48-51.
- 1977 Iturralde-Vinent, M. 1977. Los movimientos tectónicos de la etapa de desarrollo platafórmico de Cuba. Informes Científico-Técnicos no. 20, Academia de Ciencias de Cuba, 24 p.
- 1977 Albear, J.F., M. Iturralde-Vinent, et al. 1977. Geología de las provincias de La Habana y Ciudad de La Habana. Resultados de las investigaciones científicas y del levantamiento geológico escala 1:250 000. (unpublished report Instituto de Geología y Paleontología).La Habana.
- 1976 Iturralde-Vinent, M. 1976-1977. Estratigrafía de la zona Calabazas-Achotal, Mayarí Arriba, Oriente. Rev. La Minería en Cuba. Part I: (5): 9-23; Part II: (6): 32-40.
- 1976 Iturralde-Vinent, M. 1976. Clasificación de las rocas plutónicas. Rev. Voluntad Hidráulica no. (37):40-45.
- 1975 Iturralde-Vinent, M. 1975. Problems of the application of two modern tectonics hypothesis to Cuba and the Caribbean region. AAPG Bull. 59(5):838-855.
- 1975 Iturralde-Vinent, M. 1975. Problemas en la aplicación de dos hipótesis tectónicas modernas a Cuba y la región Caribe. Rev. Tecnológica XIII(1):46-63.
- 1974 Iturralde-Vinent, M. 1974. Circum-Caribbean tectonics and igneous activity and the evolution of the Caribbean plate: Discussion. GSA Bull. 85(12):1961-1962.
- 1973 Skwaletski, E. & M. Iturralde-Vinent, 1973 Normación de los trabajos ingeniero-geológicos. Rev. Voluntad Hidráulica no. 26, 4p.
- 1973 Iturralde-Vinent, M., E. Skwaletski & A. González, 1973. El estudio del carso con fines hidroeconómicos. Serie Espeleológica y Carsológica no. 46, Academia de Ciencias de Cuba, 5 p.
- 1973 Iturralde-Vinent, M. 1973. Síntesis de geología de Cuba. Unidad de Impresión Ligera del Instituto Superior Tecnológico José Antonio Echeverría, 80 p.
- 1973 Iturralde-Vinent, M. & A. Morales, 1973. Contribución al estudio del Mioceno Superior y Plioceno al norte de Matanzas. Rev. Tecnológica XI(5-6): 24-31.
- 1972 Skwaletski, E. & M. Iturralde-Vinent (ed.). 1972. Estudios ingeniero-geológicos con fines hidroeconómicos en Cuba. Publicación Especial del grupo Hidráulico del DAP, La Habana, 82 p.
- 1972 Iturralde-Vinent, M. 1972. Principales características de la estratigrafía del Oligoceno y Mioceno Inferior de Cuba. Rev. Tecnológica V (3-4): 24-35.
- 1972 Iturralde-Vinent, M. 1972. Principal characteristics of Oligocene and Lower Miocene stratigraphy of Cuba. AAPG Bull. 56 (12): 2369-2379.
- 1972 Iturralde-Vinent, M. 1972. La documentación ingeniero-geológica de los testigos de perforación en rocas carsificadas. in: Skwaletski, E. & M. Iturralde-Vinent,(ed.), 1972., p. 46-52.
- 1972 Iturralde-Vinent, M. 1972. La división en complejos litofaciales y su aplicación a estudios estratigráficos regionales. Rev. Tecnológica X (1-2): 42-44.
- 1972 Iturralde-Vinent, M. 1972. Estudio cuantitativo de la actividad del carso en Cuba. Rev. Voluntad Hidráulica (23):41-47.
- 1972 Furrazola Bermúdez, G. & E. Kreisel (with M. Iturralde-Vinent), 1972. Discoastéridos y Braarudosféridos del Eoceno Inferior de la Formación Universidad. Rev. Ministerio Minería, Combustible y Metalurgia, 31 p.
- 1971 Skwaletski, E. & M. Iturralde-Vinent, 1971. Propiedades ingeniero-geológicas de las rocas carsificadas. Rev. Voluntad Hidráulica (22): 17-24.
- 1971 Skwaletski, E. & M. Iturralde-Vinent, 1971. Estudio ingeniero-geológico del carso cubano. Serie Espeleológica y Carsológica no. 32, Academia de Ciencias de Cuba, 57 p.
- 1971 Skwaletski, E. & M. Iturralde-Vinent, 1971. El carso y la construcción hidrotécnica en Cuba. Rev. Voluntad Hidráulica (20): 41-47.
- 1971 Iturralde-Vinent, M. 1971. Estratigrafía y magmatismo de la provincia de Matanzas y noroeste de Las Villas. Rev. Tecnológica IX (2): 27-40
- 1971 Iturralde-Vinent, M. 1971. Correlación estratigráfica del Neógeno de Cuba. Rev. tecnológica IX (1): 15-19.
- 1971 Iturralde-Vinent, M. & I. Iliev, 1971. Manual del ingeniero-geólogo hidrotécnico. Instituto Cubano del Libro, La Habana. 210 p.
- 1970 Skwaletski, E. & M. Iturralde-Vinent, 1970. Contenido y principios básicos para la elaboración del mapa ingeniero geológico de Cuba. Rev. Voluntad Hidráulica (19): 35-43.
- 1970 Iturralde-Vinent, M. 1970. Neogene stratigraphy in western Cuba, new data. AAPG Bull. 54(4): 658-661.
- 1970 Iturralde-Vinent, M. 1970. Las investigaciones ingeniero-geológicas de los conjuntos hidráulicos. Rev. Voluntad Hidráulica del INRH, (18): 50-56.
- 1970 Iturralde-Vinent, M. 1970. Estudio preliminar de los sedimentos del Neógeno de la provincia de Camagüey. Rev. Tecnológica VIII (4): 28-32.
- 1969 Iturralde-Vinent, M. 1969. Principal characteristics of Cuban Neogene stratigraphy. AAPG Bull. 53(9):1938-1955.
- 1969 Iturralde-Vinent, M. 1969. El Neógeno en la provincia de Matanzas, Cuba. Publ. Esp. no, 7 del INRH. p. 3-30.
- 1969 Iturralde-Vinent, M. 1969. El estudio ingeniero geológico de los conjuntos hidráulicos. Revista Constructores, 4 p.
- 1969 Iturralde-Vinent, M. 1969. El carso de La Carraca, provincia de Matanzas, Cuba. Rev. Tecnológica VII(1): 38-44.
- 1968 Lapshin, N., A. Oskotski, M. Iturralde-Vinent, 1968. División en regiones hidrogeológical de la zona Güane-Mantua, provincia de Pinar del Río. Publ. Esp. no. 5 del INRH, p. 33-54.
- 1968 Iturralde-Vinent, M. 1968. Remarks on "Fundamentals of Mid-Tertiary stratigraphical correlation" in reference to Cuba. Journal of Paleontology 42(1): 230-231.
- 1968 Iturralde-Vinent, M. 1967. Notas sobre la obra "Fundamentals of Mid-Tertiary Stratigrafical Correlation " de F. Eames y otros. Rev. tecnológica V(1): 55-56.
- 1967 Iturralde-Vinent, M. 1967. Preliminary report of distribution of karst landscape in Cuba and their relation to geology. The professional Geographer XIX (4): 208-209.
- 1967 Iturralde-Vinent, M. 1967. Kainoconus ovalis, nuevo microfósil insertae sedis del Eoceno y Paleoceno de Cuba. Rev. Tecnológica V(5): 12-16.
- 1967 Iturralde-Vinent, M. 1967. Foraminíferos plactónicos del Oligoceno Superior en la provincia de Pinar del Río. Publicación Especial no. 4 del Instituto Nacional de Recursos Hidráulicos, p. 5-8.
- 1967 Iturralde-Vinent, M. 1967. Estudio sistemático de los foraminíferos planctónicos del pozo Souvenir 2-25 del Oligoceno cubano. Publicación Especial no. 3 del Instituto Nacional de Recursos Hidráulicos, p. 13-22.
- 1967 Iturralde-Vinent, M. 1967. Estudio geológico preliminar del municipio de Manguito, provincia de Matanzas, Cuba. Publ. Esp. no. 4 del INRH, p. 11-22.
- 1967 Furrazola Bermúdez, G. & M. Iturralde-Vinent 1967. Estudio micropaleontológico del pozo Pijuán no. 47 del Oligoceno Superior de Cuba. Rev. Tecnológica V (1):3-11.
- 1966 Iturralde-Vinent, M. 1966. Comentarios sobre la obra Geología de Cuba del Instituto Cubano de Recursos Minerales. Rev. Tecnológica IV (5): 1-5.
- 1966 Iturralde-Vinent, M. 1966. Cassigerinella regularis, nueva especie de foraminífero plactónico de la Formación Tinguaro del Oligoceno cubano. Publicación Especial no. 2 del Inst. Nac. Recursos Hidráulicos, p. 5-15.
- 1964 Iturralde-Vinent, M. 1964. La Cueva del Murciélago. Boletín del Grupo Espeleológico Martel de Cuba, 10 p. La Habana
