= History of the French Foreign Legion =

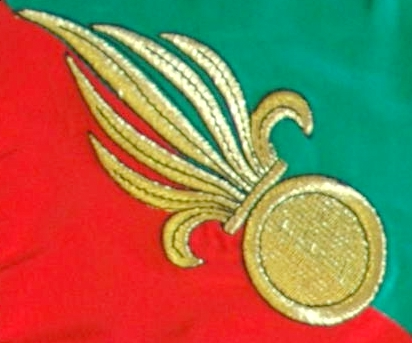
The Foreign Legion's grenade emblem

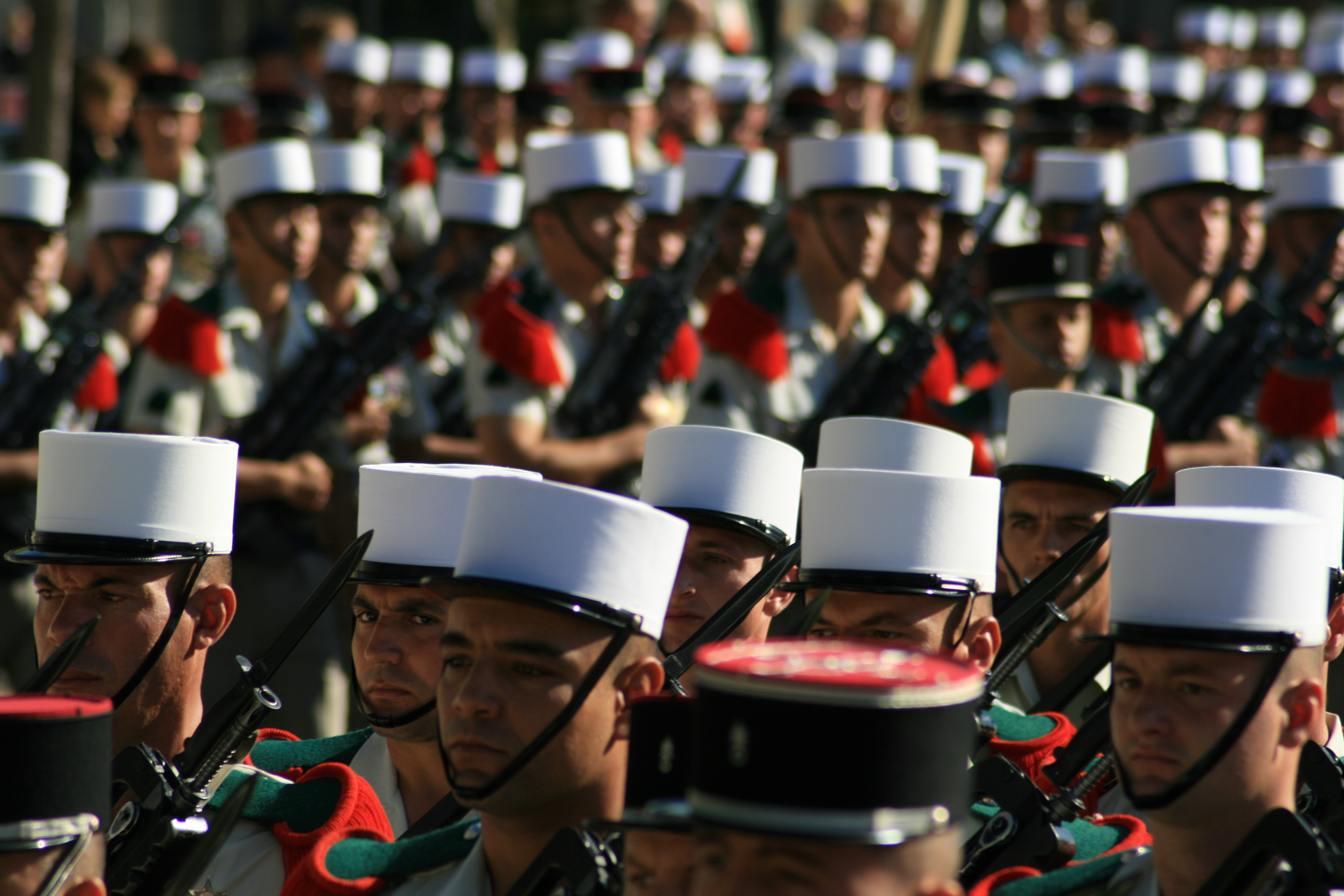
Modern-day members of the Foreign Legion in parade formation.

The French Foreign Legion has had a long and unique history amongst the units of the French Army. It was historically formed of expatriate enlisted personnel led by French officers. Founded by a royal ordinance issued by King Louis Philippe of France on March 9, 1831, with the aim of bolstering the strength of the French Army while also finding a use for the influx of refugees inundating France at the time. The Foreign Legion subsequently found a permanent home in the ranks of the French military. The Foreign Legion's history spans across the Conquest of Algeria, the Franco-Prussian War, numerous colonial exploits, both World Wars, the First Indochina War, and the Algerian War.

== Background ==
The French had a history of employing regiments of foreign soldiers from an early date: such as Louis XI's creation of the Scottish Guards in the 15th century. Later kings, from Francois I to Louis XVI made use of both German and Swiss Regiments. Even after the Revolution, the National Assembly in June 1792 created a Foreign Volunteer Legion and in the Revolutionary Wars Dutch, Italian, and Polish soldiers were employed. Napoleon employed Hanoverian, Portuguese, and Spanish Legions, and Poles from the Vistula region.

Following the fall of Napoleon in 1815, surviving units amalgamated under the title of the "Royal Foreign Legion", renamed in 1821 as the "Regiment of Hohenlohe" which was disbanded in 1831 at the instigation of the Foreign Legion.

== Formation of the Legion ==
On March 9, 1831, the Foreign Legion was created by a royal ordinance issued by King Louis Philippe, at the suggestion of Minister of War Nicolas Jean-de-Dieu Soult. Nine days later, on March 18, 1831, an additional directive was issued restricting membership in the newly formed Legion of foreigners. The latter directive reflected the initial purpose of the Foreign Legion as a mechanism to lessen the potential disruption to the provisional French government and the newly enthroned House of Orléans posed by the large influx of foreigners following the collapse of the Bourbon Restoration in the previous year's July Revolution. Some of these foreigners in France were the remnants of regiments formed during the campaigns of Napoleon of Germans, Swedes, Poles, Hungarians, and others. These foreign veterans had been left with little means and professional military training which proved to be of concern to the French government. Many had flocked to France following the July Revolution or came to France following failures of the revolutionary or independence movements throughout Europe; in addition to an influx of idealistic revolutionaries and nationalists, France also became home to large numbers of immigrants who had removed from their countries of origin for economic or personal reasons. This influx of foreigners had become a significant burden for the newly established French government's administrative capabilities; for example during March 1831 a depot established in Langres, France to accommodate these recent immigrants had been inundated to the point of overstretch. Furthermore, French military operations in Algeria, which had commenced under Charles X, had proven unpopular with portions of the French populace as the campaign, despite its initial success, had become bogged down in the occupation of that country. The formation of the Foreign Legion would help address the domestic threat of dissidents fomenting political instability while contributing to government's colonial endeavors in Algeria.

As part of the Provisional Government's policy of removing potential dissidents from France, upon enlistment recruits were guaranteed anonymity as a condition of their service; information provided to the legion was accepted on face value. This was the beginning of what would become the tradition of enlisting volunteers under the anonymat. Officially enlistment of French nationals in the Legion was forbidden, so many French criminals who enlisted during this time claimed that they were French-speaking Swiss or Walloons. Such enlistments were not within the proposed scope of the Foreign Legion, however the Provisional Government proved not terribly distressed by the voluntary removal of members of a troublesome social element at a time when its control of the nation was less than concrete.

The formation of the Foreign Legion was fraught with difficulties from the outset.

The officer corps of the Foreign Legion comprised an assortment of Napoleonic-era officers, expatriate officers, and younger, more recently commissioned French officers. The Napoleonic-era officers were able to return to the French Army from semi-retired status following the July Revolution. Many Napoleonic-era veterans were forced into semi-retirement on half-pay by the Bourbon Dynasty which viewed their loyalty suspect and perceived these veterans as a threat. However, during the interim many of these officers' martial skills had deteriorated in sixteen idle years. Officers of foreign extraction were mostly of Swiss, German, and Polish origin. Some of these officers came from units such as the Hohenlohe Regiment, an expatriate formation similar to the Foreign Legion. Many newly commissioned French officers in the Foreign Legion proved less than competent; since it was widely understood that the Foreign Legion was raised for service outside Metropolitan France, the postings entailed were viewed with little enthusiasm by many officers and the prospect of leading an émigré unit into combat had little allure to many capable officers. In additions to the problems within the Foreign Legion's officer cadre, the Foreign Legion lacked experienced non-commissioned officers and efforts to recruit veteran NCOs from retirement were largely unsuccessful. Non-commissioned officers by necessity were selected from the enlisted ranks; these men often proved ill-suited to the responsibilities of NCOs. At its inception the Foreign Legion was organized into a single regiment of seven battalions. Each battalion followed the form of a battalion of a regular French line infantry battalion; each battalion had eight companies of 112 men each. Each battalion was formed of men of specific nationalities or linguistic groups; the 1st Battalion was composed of veterans of the Swiss Guards and the Hohenlohe Regiment, the 2nd and 3rd Battalions were composed of Swiss and German volunteers, the 4th Battalion consisted of those of Spanish extraction, the 5th Battalion consisted mostly of a mixture of Sardinians and Italians, the 6th Battalion was formed of Belgians and Dutch, and the 7th Battalion consisted of volunteers of Polish origin.

As Algeria proved an unpopular posting with regular French Army regiments, the arrival of the Foreign Legion was welcomed.

== First operations in Algeria ==
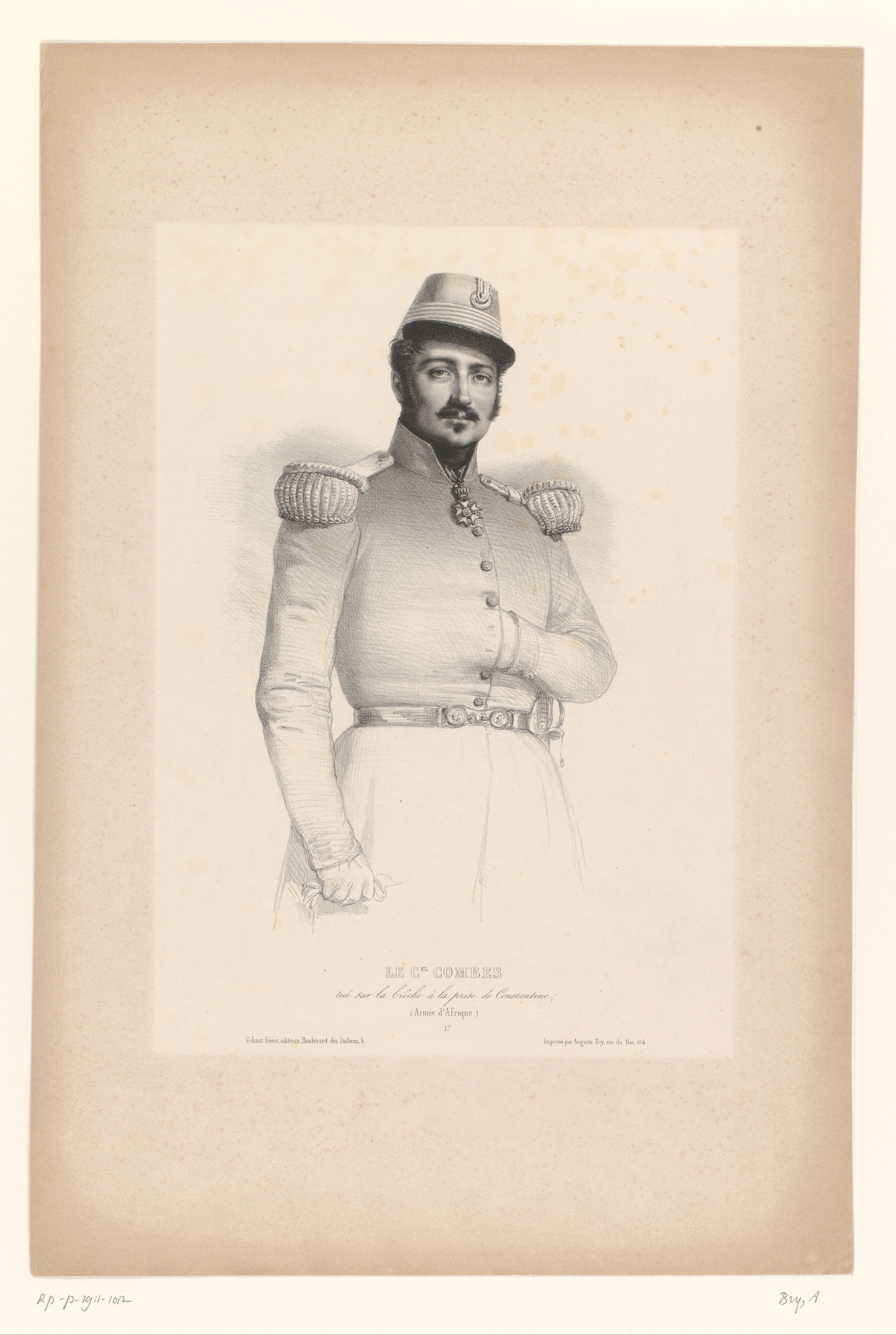
A lithograph of Col. Michel Combe, with the caption (in French) "killed in action at the capture of Constantine"

The Foreign Legion was first deployed to Algeria with the battalions of the legion arriving in batches between 1831 and 1832. In late 1831, the first legionnaires, members of the 1st Battalion, landed in Algeria. This battalion set about building a barracks and other facilities for the regiment's garrison in addition to draining a nearby marsh and constructing a road in the area. Upon arriving in Algeria most of the Legion was stationed around Algiers; however the 4th Battalion was dispatched west of Algiers to help secure Oran while the 6th Battalion was dispatched east to assist in the occupation of Bône. On April 1, 1832, the Legion's new commander, Colonel Michel Combe, who was himself an ardent advocate of the role of light infantry in the French Army having previously established the Chasseurs à pied. Colonel Combe arrived in Algeria carrying the Legion's regimental colors which had been presented to the Legion by order of King Louis Philippe. Upon taking command, Colonel Combe did much to improve the regiment's reputation among the higher echelons of command by increasingly volunteering his regiment for engineering duties at a time they were seen as largely unfit for combat duty owing to the chronic discipline and organization problems it suffered. This allowed Colonel Combe and, perhaps more importantly, his cadre of NCOs to bring the regiment into rank and file discipline while still being of use to the occupation effort.

The Legion first entered combat when elements of the 3rd Battalions entered combat at the Battle of Maison Carrée approximately ten kilometers outside of Algiers, near the present-day area of El Harach. The French army of occupation was attempting secure the small strip of coast under French control with the construction of a series of blockhouses and other fortifications along its perimeter. The 3rd Battalion was deployed in the forward-most areas of French control, subjecting it to the dangers of raids by Algerians nomads, in particular the El Ouiffa tribe which was operating out of that area. The El Ouiffa tribe was responsible for numerous killings and other acts of lawlessness in the area and their presence had begun to demoralize the 3rd Battalion. Low morale and the constant stress of operating exposed to local attack had led to the beginning of desertions from the 3rd Battalion. The elements of the 1st and 3rd battalions involved in the action seized the buildings in the area occupied by the El Ouiffa tribe.

In Bône, the 6th Battalion, composed of Italians and Sardinians, performed admirably despite an outbreak of cholera throughout the battalion with all of companies still engaging in combat as part of the 2nd Brigade of the Army of Africa.

With the Spanish Civil War looming in 1834, Spain requested that the French government disband the 4th Battalion of the Legion, which consisted primarily of Spaniards, so that they might return to their homeland in the service of the standing government. The 7th Battalion, composed of Polish volunteers, was thereafter re-designated as the 4th Battalion.

The elements of the Legion stationed across Algeria had been redeployed to Palma in the Balearic Islands by the beginning of August 1835. On September 16, 1835, after assembling as a whole unit for the first time the Foreign Legion departed for Spain.

== The Foreign Legion in Spain ==
In order to support Isabella's claim to the Spanish throne against her uncle, the French government decided to send the Legion to Spain and so, on June 28, 1835, the Legion was handed over to the Spanish government. This had the added benefit that in the event that France decided to remove itself from the conflict in Spain, the government would not have to deal with the issue of extricating Frenchmen from conflict. The Legion disembarked at the port of Tarragona in Catalonia on 17 August with around 4,100 men. The calling them Los Argelinos (the Algerians) due to their previous posting. Upon his arrival Colonel Bernelle was granted the rank Marshall of the Royal Armies of Her Majestsy Isabelle II.

One of Col. Bernelle's first actions as commander of the Legion was to reorganize the Foreign Legion, abolishing the previous system of battalions organized around the nationality of the enlisted men. The extant battalions of the Foreign Legion at the time were replaced with five newly consolidated battalions composed of members from every battalion throughout the legion regardless of nationality. Each of these five battalions would have two companies considered elite in comparison to regular line infantry companies; one of these companies was composed of grenadiers and the other was composed of voltigeurs. Surprisingly the newly heterogeneous nature of the origins of soldiers within the battalions fostered a competitive environment among the ranks with soldiers striving to outdo soldiers of origins alien to their own. Col. Bernelle upon the Legion's arrival in Spain issued an order instituting corporal punishment; Bernelle reasoned that though the practice of caning was forbidden in the French Army, it was permissible in the Spanish Army of which he was now a part. By September 1836, Bernelle ordered the Legion to move out from their port of arrival to Catalonia, where in the mountainous terrain of that region he was forced to disperse his troops in company-sized detachments throughout the region so that they could effectively engage Carlist forces utilizing guerrilla tactics. By January 1836 the Legion was ordered to redeploy to Vittoria where it would find itself under the command of General Espartito.

Col. Bernelle, doubtful of the competence of the Spanish military and their willingness to support the Legion composed of foreigners when their own country was in such disarray, decided to raise additional battalions to supplement his existing forces. This distrust on Bernelle's part was due in part to his previous experiences in the Peninsular War, along with his assessment of the Spanish government's attitude towards the newly arrived Foreign Legion. Throughout his command Colonel Bernelle raised three squadrons of lancers, a mobile artillery battery, an engineering company, and a medical company to increase the Legion's autonomy and allowing greater flexibility in their operations.

Despite these successes the Legion was chronically under-supplied, a problem which was compounded by the fact that since having arrived in Spain the delivery of the Legion's payroll had become sporadic. This precipitated a decline in the morale of the legion over 1836 which would eventually result in desertions from the Legion. Col. Bernelle incensed at the lack of support for his men, from either Spain or France, was dismissed after drawing the ire of French ministers. Colonel Bernelle, relieved of command, was replaced by Col. Jean-Louis Lebeau by Minister Maison. Col. Lebeau, though a competent officer and veteran of Waterloo, proved not to be up to the task of commanding the Legion. By the time assumed command of the Legion, its state had degraded beyond his abilities to reverse. Colonel Lebeau was replaced in turn by Col. Joseph Conrad in November 1836. Conrad had previously served in the Legion as a Lieutenant-colonel; he resigned in February 1836, following a dispute between himself and Colonel Bernelle over the influence of Bernelle's wife in military affairs which had become an issue of contention among the Legion's officer cadre during Bernelle's tenure. Though Conrad was a competent officer, well liked by his subordinates, he had inherited command of a Legion that was a shadow of its former self. By January 1837, the Legion had been reduced to two battalions and an understrength squadron of cavalry.

=== Final Year in Spain ===
Active military operations resumed by March when the Legion had moved into Aragon. On May 24 the Foreign Legion, attached to Spanish forces shadowing Carlist forces near Huesca, engaged in the Battle of Huesca, a Carlist force which made camp for the night. The Legion's attack caught the Carlist force unprepared and was initially successful with Legion pushing the Carlist forces almost back to the very gates of Huesca. However the attack was not supported by its accompanying forces under General Iribarren and the Carlist forces had very strong defensive positions. The Legion soon came under the defensive fire from Carlists who had taken up positions behind walls on either flank of the Legion. Despite General Iribarren ordering a battalion to the Legion's support, Colonel Conrad determined that the attack had little chance of success and ordered a retreat. The Legion was able to take about one third of their wounded in the retreat. However the Battle of Huesca proved to have had a substantial toll on the Legion's strength: 350 legionaries and 28 officers died in the battle. The timing of the Battle of Huesca was unfortunate as shortly thereafter the enlistments of nearly 1,000 men ran out. This departure of so many men combined with the casualties from Huesca reduced the Legion's strength to a single battalion.

The Legion was positioned on the right flank of the Spanish army's line of battle and in a coincidence, the Legion fought a force of foreign volunteers and mercenaries in Carlist employ. The Spanish forces to the Legion's left broke rank and retreated under the Carlist onslaught, leaving the Legion encircled as it fought on. Colonel Conrad, attempting to rally his men to attack, proceeded out in front of his skirmish line inciting his men to march forward, however he was struck and killed by a bullet, becoming the first commander of the Foreign Legion to die in battle. Without a leader and demoralized, the Legion withdrew from the field.

Following the death of Colonel Conrad, command of the Foreign Legion was assumed by Lieutenant-colonel Andrè Camille Ferray.

The Legion finally returned to France in January 1839 with only 63 officers and 159 enlisted remaining of the original 4,000 men who were deployed to Spain.

== Second Deployment to Algeria ==
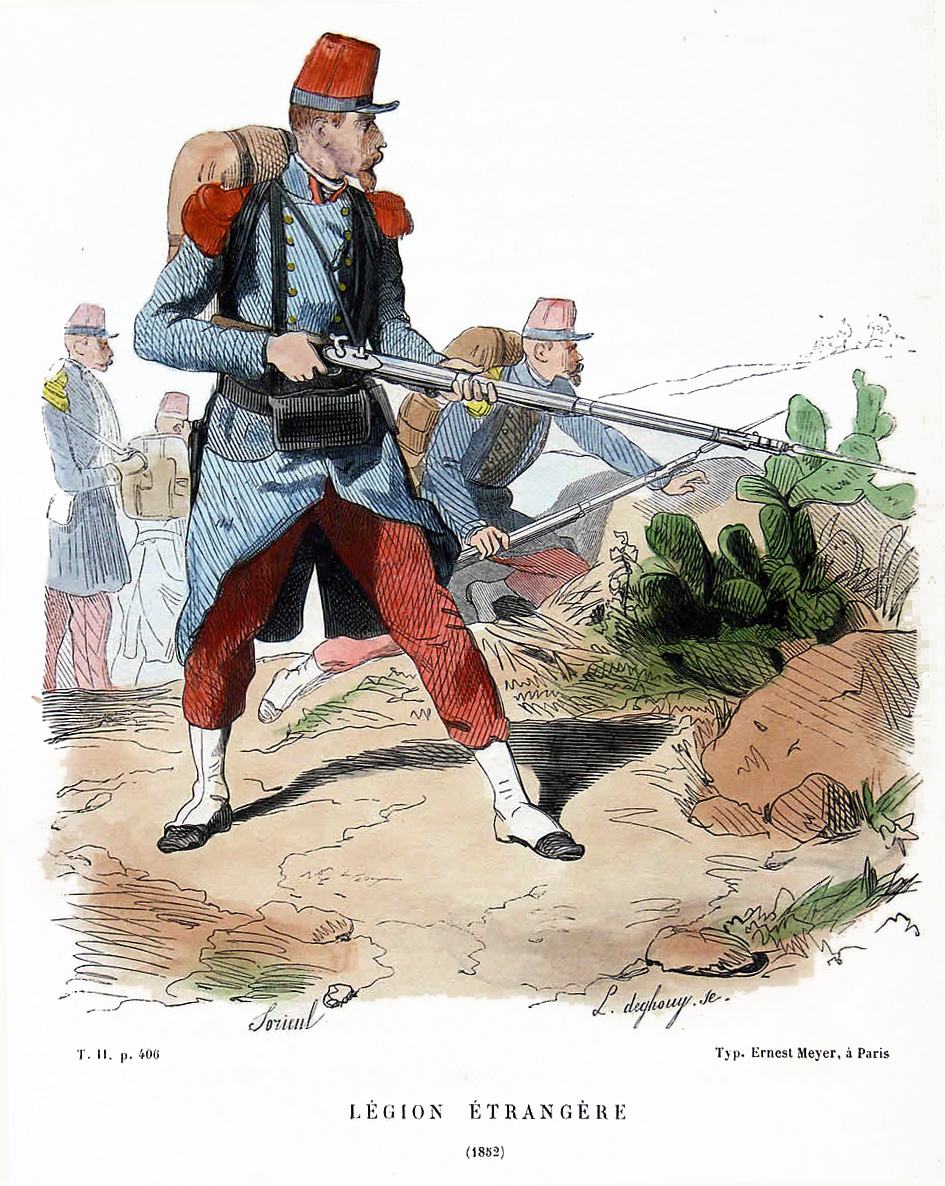
A Foreign Legionnaire in Algeria

In 1836 the French government decided that instead of deploying the reinforcements intended for the Foreign Legion to Spain, as the issue had become politically volatile, the intended reinforcements would be formed into a second Foreign Legion and deployed to Algeria. By December 15, 1836, the first elements of the Foreign Legion, a battalion numbering around 1,600 men, had reached Algeria led by Major Bedeau.

In 1839 many of the defeated Carlist forces sought refuge in France from retribution of the Spanish government. The French government resorted to a familiar method of unburdening itself of unwanted refugees, offering Carlist refugees enlistment in the Foreign Legion. On October 1, 1839, the 4th Battalion of the Foreign Legion was officially established at its depot at Pau from many of these refugees. By March 1840, three of its companies had arrived in Algiers with another five companies being organized in Algeria. On August 28, 1840, a 5th Battalion of the Foreign Legion was established by royal decree. The 5th Battalion began organizing near Perpignan; on October 3, the battalion staff and two companies of the 5th Battalion arrived at Algiers with the rest of the battalion arrived the next day. By December 30, 1840, there were five battalions in Algeria, leading the French government to reorganize the Legion's forces into two regiments with the 1st Regiment of the Foreign Legion stationed in Algiers and the 2nd Regiment of the Foreign Legion stationed in Constantine. The two regiments of the Legion operated largely independent of one another. When General Bugeaud assumed command of the Army of Africa and shifted the emphasis of operations in the theater to fast, mobile columns used to pursue the native insurgents through the Algerian countryside, the Foreign Legion responded positively to this new strategy and its overall quality began to improve. This improvement in quality was in part an effect of these mobile columns allowing the various battalions and companies of the Foreign Legion to be united under a single command as opposed to being dispersed throughout a multitude of defensive blockhouses and garrisons. This emphasis on mobility also required the Legion's officers to cover the same distances as their men, in effect causing them to lead by example, which served to raise the enlisted ranks' opinions of these officers. On March 15, 1844, the duc d'Aumale led a charge of men from the best companies of the 2nd Regiment at the village of M'chouneche in the Aures Mountains. The duc d'Aumale was sufficiently impressed by the performance of the Legionaries under his command that he requested that King Louis Philippe grant the regiment its own standard.

The Revolutions of 1848 had little impact on most of the Legion; however, the 2nd Regiment lost 618 men of Italian origin following a request of the Piedmontese ambassador to release nationals of his nation during the political turmoil.

== Crimean War ==
The Foreign Legion received orders to prepare five battalions—three from the 1st Regiment and two from the 2nd Regiment—for service in the Crimean campaign. Two battalions would be drawn from each regiment to form an infantry brigade, while the third remaining battalion would be used as to establish and garrison depot for receiving supplies and reinforcements. The depot was established on the Gallipoli peninsula. Shortly after arriving at Gallipoli, a cholera epidemic broke out and killed over 200 legionnaires. For a while the Legion's brigade was held on station at the Gallipoli depot until eight companies were organized into a battalion de marche and assigned to General François Certain Canrobert's division which had also been afflicted by cholera. On September 14, 1854, the battalion de marche arrived at Calamita Bay. On September 20, the Legion's battalion de marche participated in the Battle of Alma. The battalion de marche acting as skirmishers engaged Russian forces for three hours before the Russians retired from the field. The battalion de marche was later disbanded and then reincorporated into their respective parent units in October as the rest of the Legion's forces arrived from Gallipoli. The reunited brigade was under the command of Brigadier Achille Bazaine. The brigade encamped in the heights near Strelitska Bay, which the French forces were using to land provision for the French forces in the region. The Legionnaires there used to expand the allied entrenchments towards the Russian defensive lines. The Legion spent much of the ensuing months repelling harassing Russian raids against their positions. On May 1, 1855, Legion forces conducted a daring nighttime assault on a crucial heavy mortar battery in Russian lines. Following this and a few subsequent actions, the Foreign Legion largely spent its time engaged in engineering duties such as the construction of entrenchments and other defensive works. Once the Russians evacuated their forces from Sevastopol, the Legion was given the task of occupying the city's port. On March 3, 1856, the sound of a single cannon's solitary fire signaled an end to the war. By July the elements of the Legion which had deployed to the conflict in Crimea had returned to the headquarters of the Foreign Legion in Sidi Bel Abbès.

== Reorganization and return to Algeria ==
=== The Second Foreign Legion ===
In January 1855, Napoleon III decided to reorganize the structure of the foreign regiments in the service of France by raising an additional legion (2me Legion etrangére) of the foreign emigres. This second Foreign Legion was to be entirely formed of Swiss volunteers. The regiment was planned to consist of five battalions with two regiments of infantry, each consisting of two battalions, and a battalion of riflemen (tirailleurs). However enthusiasm for enlistment in this new legion was below expectations and it soon was clear there would not be enough volunteers to fill the ranks of this Swiss legion as conceived. This lack of manpower stemmed from the fact that both France and Britain, in need of recruits, were competing for the Swiss volunteers. However, the French enlistment bonus offered to Swiss volunteers was twenty francs, which paled in comparison to the British 150 franc bonus. Ultimately France was able to recruit 1,600 men for the 2nd Foreign Legion, near a fifth of the number of men necessary for Napoleon III's plan. This led the French government to decide to disband the 1st Regiment of the Foreign Legion after the conclusion of the Crimean War, folding its battalions into the 2nd Foreign Regiment (2eme Régiment etrangère); the Swiss volunteers were then organized into a new 1st Foreign Regiment. As originally organized the 1st Foreign Regiment consisted of two infantry battalions and two companies of tirailleurs.

=== Return to Algeria ===
Following the conclusion of the Crimean War, the Foreign Legion withdrew its forces and returned to Algeria.

== Second Italian War of Independence ==
The two Foreign Legion regiments took part in the war in Italy against the Austrians as a part of MacMahon's II Corps. When the Austrians declared war on Piedmont in April 1859, the 1st Foreign Regiment had been transferred to Corsica in hopes of bolstering its ranks with Corsican volunteers; by May the 1st Foreign Regiment arrived in Genoa. The 2nd Foreign Regiment arrived at Genoa in May as well having departed from Oran. A brigade was formed from the two regiments as the 1st Foreign Regiment was under-strength with only slight more than 600 men in its ranks. The Legion took part in the Battle of Magenta where the II Corps played an important part in the French victory and the Foreign Legion performed well. On June 7, 1859, the Legion forces in Italy entered the city of Milan to the delight of the Milanese. After the battle the under-strength 1st Foreign Regiment remained in Milan to recruit. Meanwhile, the 2nd Foreign Regiment took part in the French Army's two-week pursuit of the Austrians which culminated in a bloody French victory at Solferino.

== Mexico ==
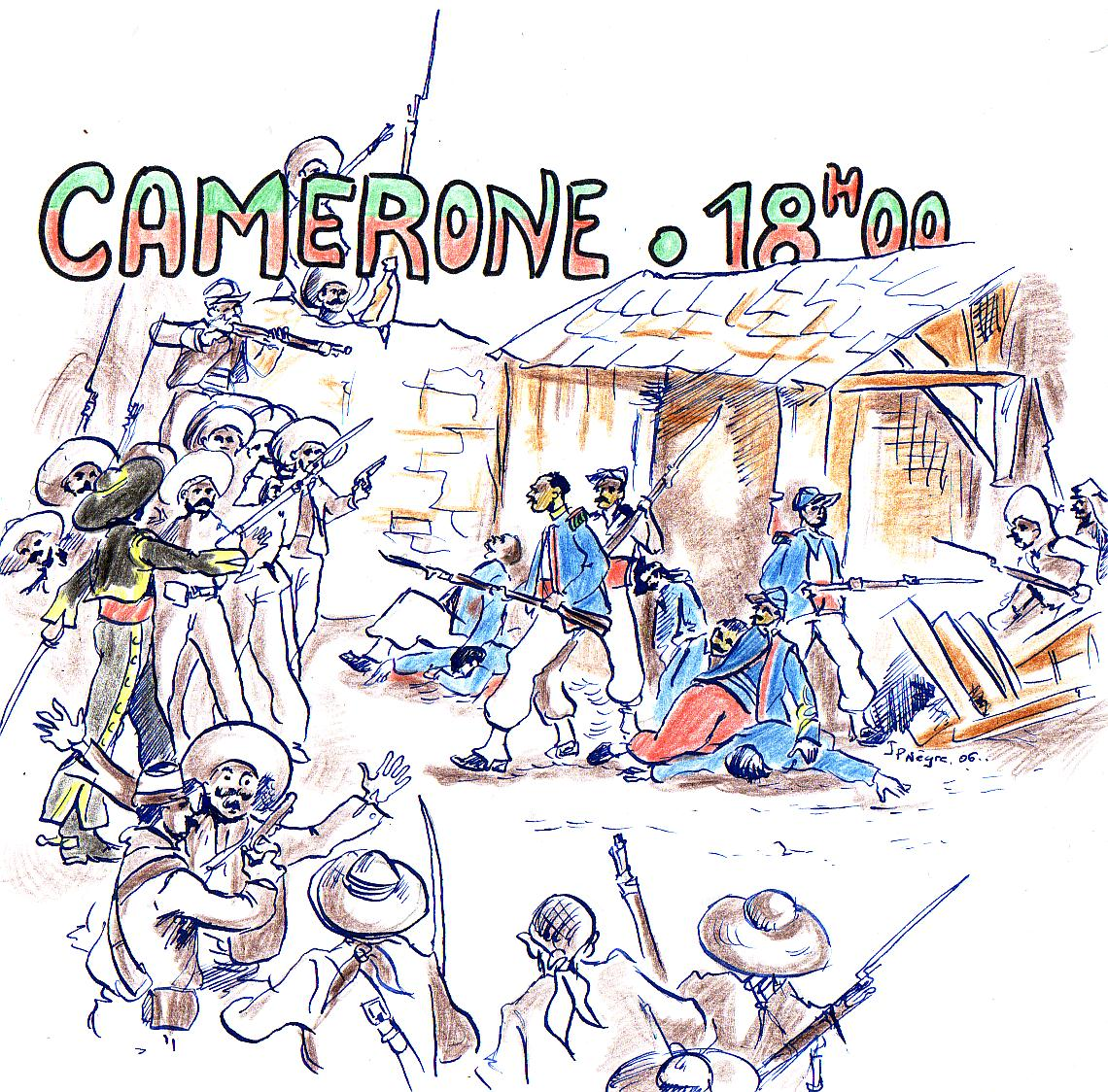
Battle of Camarón

The creation of the Second Mexican Empire was the impetus for an expansion of the French Foreign Legion. One of Maximilian I's conditions for the acceptance of the Mexican throne was the provision of a corps of 10,000 European soldiers. The Foreign Legion was loaned by Napoleon III to the Crown of Mexico for this purpose. The Legion departed Sidi-bel-Abbes, crossing the Atlantic Ocean uneventfully, and made landfall at Veracruz, Veracruz, Mexico. The Foreign Legion was assigned to escort supply convoys in the Vera Cruz highlands. The strength of the Foreign Legion was depleted by yellow fever endemic to the region. It became necessary to quickly move the Legion elements inland to the healthier clime of Córdoba, Veracruz, however this was complicated by Mexican guerrillas harassing their movement.

It was in Mexico on 30 April 1863 that the Legion earned its legendary status. A small infantry patrol led by Captain Jean Danjou, numbering 62 soldiers and 3 officers, was attacked and besieged by over a thousand Mexicans , organized in three battalions of infantry and cavalry, and was forced to make a defense in Hacienda Camarón. Despite the hopelessness of the situation, they fought nearly to the last man, with just three survivors and no ammunition and only the option to surrender, they fixed bayonets and attacked. The Mexican General was so impressed he assigned an honor guard to escort the body of Capitaine Danjou back to his battalion.

== Franco-Prussian War ==
According to French law the Legion was not to be used within Metropolitan France, and thus, it was not a part of Napoleon III's Imperial Army that capitulated at Sedan. With the defeat of the Imperial Army, the Second French Empire fell and the Third Republic was created.

The problem was that the new Third Republic was desperately short of trained soldiers, so the Legion was ordered to provide a contingent. On October 11, two provisional battalions disembarked at Toulon, the first time the Legion had been deployed in France itself. They attempted to lift the Siege of Paris by breaking through the German lines. They succeeded in re-taking Orléans, but failed to break the siege.

Following the war the Legion assisted in suppressing the Paris Commune uprising.

== Colonial warfare ==
During the Third Republic, the Legion played a major role in French colonial expansion. They fought in North Africa (where they established their headquarters at Sidi-Bel-Abbès in Algeria), Madagascar, and Indochina, where they participated in the celebrated Siege of Tuyên Quang in 1885. Following the close of the Franco-Prussian War, the Ministry of War ordered the Foreign Legion be reduced to four battalions from its war strength of six battalions.

== Sino-French War ==
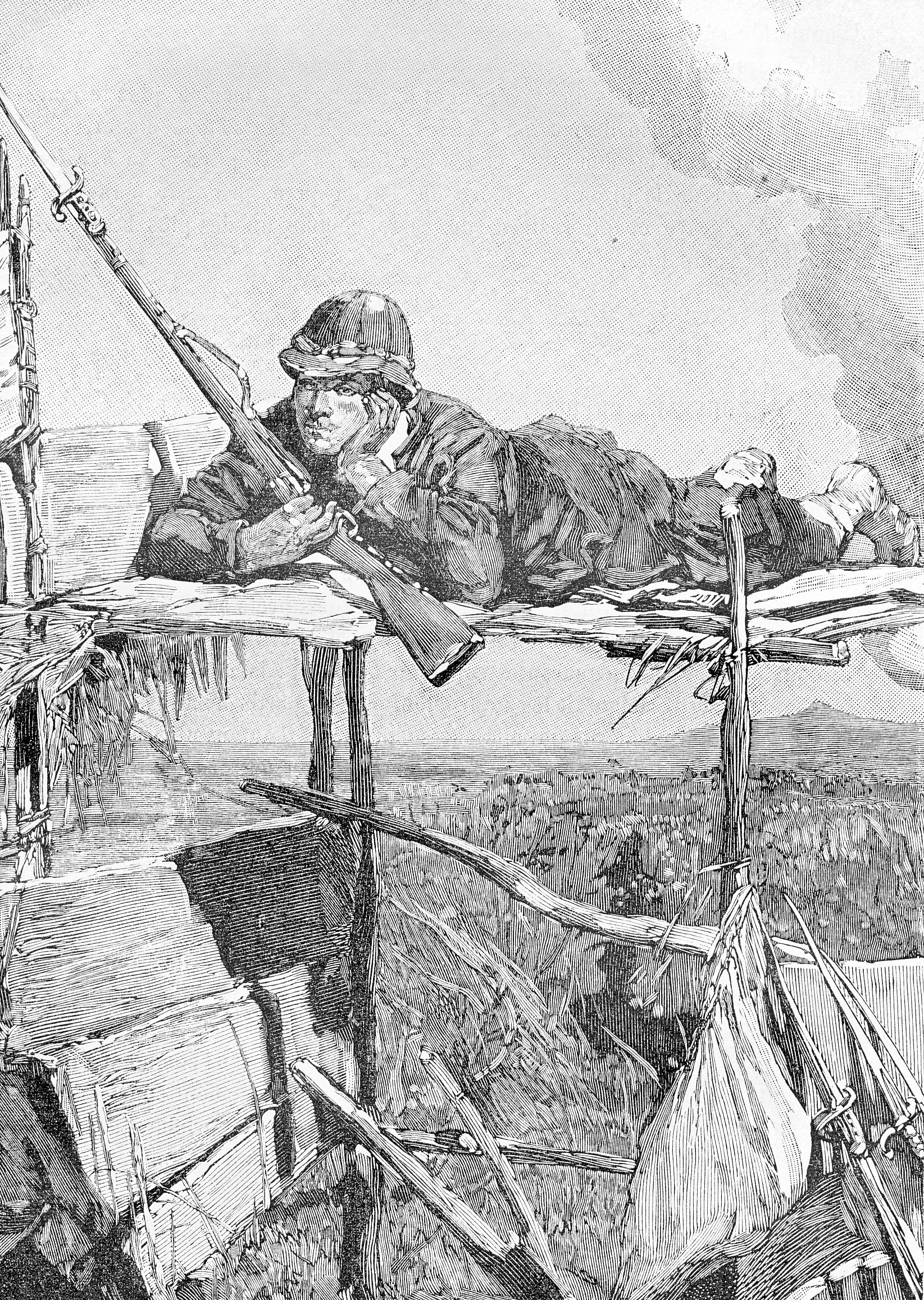
A Foreign Legionnaire resting during the Siege of Tuyên Quang

In December 1883, the 1st Battalion of the Foreign Legion participated in the capture of Sơn Tây. In May 1884 after a short French offensive campaign, France and China agreed that Chinese forces would be withdrawn from Tonkin. However, in June 1884, hostilities between France and China resumed at Lạng Sơn after a French force attempted to dislodge a Chinese garrison which had not withdrawn from the Tonkin region. Following the Chinese renewal of hostilities, French Prime Minister Jules Ferry began preparations for an invasion.

In 1884 two battalions of the Foreign Legion were attached to the 4th Marching Regiment of the 2nd Brigade of the Tonkin Expeditionary Corps during the Bắc Ninh Campaign. In November 1884, a column of 700 legionnaires under command of Lieutenant-colonel Jacques Duchesne, commanding officer of the 4th Marching Regiment, proceeded up the Lô River valley. The column assaulted a Chinese fortified position along a ridge south of Tuyên Quang. Then when the column reached Tuyên Quang and a garrison was established in the town; the garrison was composed primarily of Legion forces. The column departed Tuyên Quang on November 23, 1884, and the Tuyên Quang garrison was subsequently surrounded by Black Flag forces, marking the commencement of the Siege of Tuyên Quang.

French military operations elsewhere in Indochina had been restricted by order of the French Minister of War Jean-Baptiste Campenon to the confines of the Red River Delta, however on January 3, 1885 Jules Louis Lewal succeeded Campenon as Minister of War. This permitted General Louis Brière de l'Isle to organize the Lạng Sơn expeditionary column to clear resistance along the Mandarin Road, a route from Hanoi through Lạng Sơn up to the Chinese border. Elements of the Foreign Legion were part of the Lạng Sơn Expeditionary column, again as part of the 4th Marching Regiment. This relief column set north on campaign on February 3, 1884, and began encountering resistance by February 5. The French column assaulted Chinese defensive fortifications along the Mandarin Road, however this strategy proved imprudent as these fortifications proved costly to assault directly. During these assaults, one company of the Foreign Legion lost a third of its strength including its entire officer cadre and subsequent command of the company fell to its sergeant major. At the Battle of Đồng Đăng, a Foreign Legion battalion lead the vanguard of the French advance.

=== Siege of Tuyên Quang ===
The garrison at Tuyên Quang consisted of two Legion companies, a company of Tirailleurs Tonkinois, a detachment of engineers, and a detachment of artillery in the town totaling 619 men of which 390 were Foreign Legionnaires. The garrison at Tuyên Quang was commanded by Chef de Battalion Marc-Edmond Dominé of the Bataillon d'Afrique. The garrison at Tuyên Quang had been surrounded by Black Flag trench works by January 20. A failed Chinese night assault on the French position on January 26 led to the Chinese beginning of tunneling operations commencing on February 8 to mine the French positions. On February 8 the Chinese force was reinforced by an artillery battery.

== First World War ==
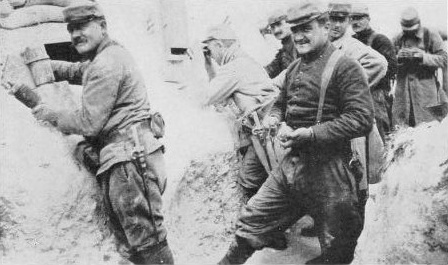
United States nationals serving in the Foreign Legion in 1916

In World War I the Foreign Legion fought in many critical battles of the war, including the Battle of Verdun. The Foreign Legion was highly decorated for its efforts in the war. Many young Americans like Fred Zinn volunteered for the Legion when the war broke out in 1914.

=== Outbreak of the war ===
At the outbreak of World War I, the Foreign Legion consisted of the 1st Foreign Regiment and the 2nd Foreign Regiment which were headquartered in Algeria at Sidi-bel-Abbès and Saida respectively. Each regiment consisted of six battalions of a 1000 men each; each regiment also had one or two Mounted Companies which, though attached to a regiment, effectively operated independently. Two companies from these regiments were garrisoned in French Indochina at the time. Also at the beginning of the war much of the Foreign Legion's strength was in Morocco as part of the French military activities there.

The French military establishment did not predict the great numbers of volunteers for French military service which began arriving at French ports following the commencement of hostilities; this presented problem for the French army on both a legal and military level. At the time French law proscribed the enlistment of aliens in any part of the French armed forces other than as a standard five-year enlistment in the Foreign Legion, however that restriction was lifted on August 3, 1914, the Ministry of War issued a decree allowing foreign volunteers to enlist in the French Army for the duration of the war. Despite the French government's swift action to accommodate the influx of expatriate volunteers from a legal viewpoint, there still remained the matter of furnishing military training to the new recruits and organizing; Minister of War Adolphe Messimy determined that these men would be formed into provisional units dubbed marching regiments (régiments de marche) to be trained and led by a seasoned officer and NCO cadre drawn from the regiments in North Africa. It was decreed that the induction of foreign volunteers was to be delayed until twenty days after France had begun to mobilize its forces to avoid impeding the deployment of combat-ready units. Following the outbreak of the war, the French Foreign Legion found itself in a difficult predicament as approximately two-thirds of the Foreign Legion's strength consisted of German and Austrian volunteers. The French High Command, uncertain of these Legionnaires' loyalty, ordered them to remain garrisoned in Algeria and Morocco.

=== Gallipoli Campaign ===
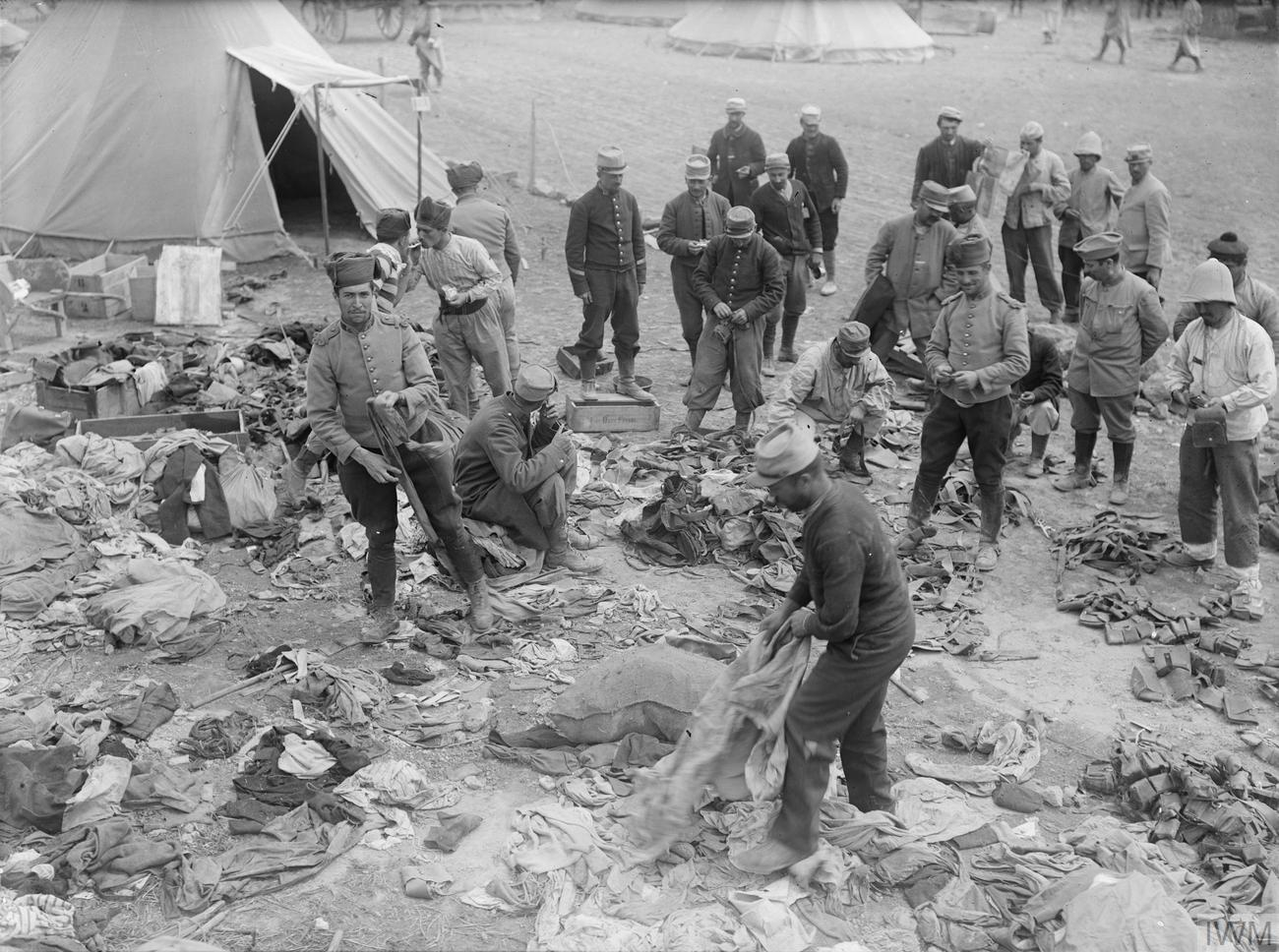
Legionnaires and Zouaves in camp at Sedd el Bahr in May 1915 during the Gallipoli Campaign

In February 1915, a battalion of 600 Legionnaires designate, consisting mostly of veterans of North Africa, was organized to participate in the Gallipoli Campaign as part of the 1st Marching Regiment of Africa (1st Régiment de march d'Afrique or 1st RMdA) under the command of Lt. Col. Nigier which was in turn assigned to the 1st Infantry Division of the Eastern Expeditionary Corps. The newly organized battalion of Legionnaires was designated as the 3rd Battalion of the 1st Marching Regiment of Africa (III/RMdA) and consisted of four companies drawn from the 1st Foreign Regiment and the 2nd Foreign Regiment. On April 25, 1915, this battalion participated in the French landings at Kum Kale on the Asiatic shore of the Dardanelles as a diversionary attack to support the Allied Landing at Cape Helles. Shortly after fighting to establish the French beachhead for the diversionary force, the 3rd Battalion was cut off in a valley facing the sea from the rest of the French forces until the Legionnaires could be relieved. The French forces at Kum Kale shortly thereafter withdrew from the Asiatic Shore and were redeployed in support of the British forces at Cape Helles.
The French Forces were redeployed to the right flank of the Allied lines on the Gallipoli peninsula on April 27, 1915. This area had been designated as S Beach and since the initial landing combat in the vicinity had been extremely light. On April 28, the French forces participated in the First Battle of Krithia, acting as the Allied anchor on their right flank. In the Second Battle of Krithia the French advanced on the Turkish positions reaching their lines at Kereves Dere. By the end of June, the 3rd Battalion had been reduced to approximately 100 men under the command of the Adjutant-Chef Léon, a non-commissioned officer. In August 1915 a detachment of 700 reinforcements from French Indochina arrived on the peninsula to rebuild the rank and file of the battalion. By October 1915 the remains of the III/RMdA were withdrawn from the Gallipoli Peninsula to Salonika.

=== Balkan Campaign ===
At Salonika the 3rd Battalion and its parent regiment were assigned to the 156th Infantry Division which was preparing to participate in the upcoming Allied operations in Serbia. The 156th Infantry Division proceeded north to the Greek-Serbian border. The Legion forces in the III/RMdA saw action during the Monastir Offensive from September to November 1916. However the Legion forces in the Balkans spent the winter of 1915–16 waging a fighting retreat in the face of a Bulgarian advance. The 3rd Battalion also engaged in delaying actions at Dent de Scie and Trana Stena. The 3rd Battalion of the 1st Marching Regiment of Africa was disbanded on 1 October 1917.

== Rif War ==
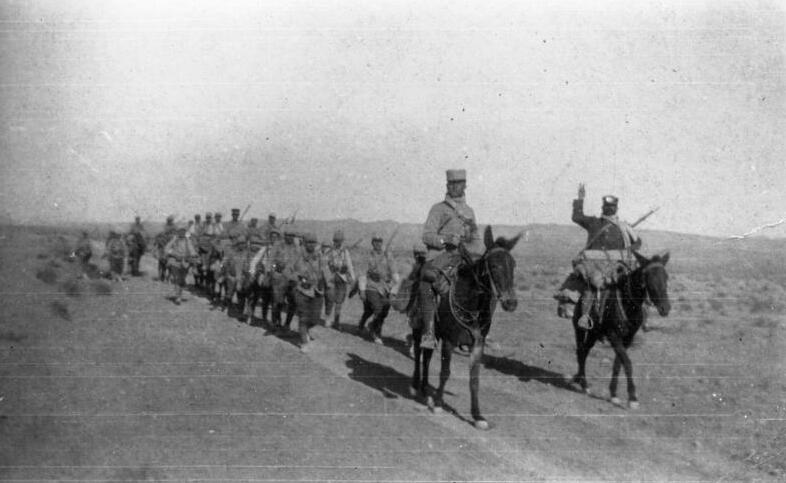
Legionnaires in Morocco, c. 1920

At the close of the First World War, the Foreign Legion's prestige was at a high; however, the Foreign Legion itself had suffered greatly in the trenches of the First World War. In 1919, the government of Spain raised the Spanish Foreign Legion and modeled it after the French Foreign Legion. General Henri Mordacq intended to rebuild the Foreign Legion as a larger military formation, doing away with the Legion's traditional role as a solely infantry formation. General Mordacq envisioned a Foreign Legion consisting not of regiments, but of divisions with cavalry, engineer, and artillery regiments in addition to the Legion's infantry mainstay. In 1920, decrees ordained the establishment of regiments of cavalry and artillery regiments. Immediately following the armistice, the Foreign Legion experienced increased enlistment which continued for the next few years. Many of the new volunteers for the Foreign Legion were of German and Russian extraction: the former being mostly veterans of World War I and the latter consisting of veterans of the White Russian movement. The Foreign Legion began the process of reorganizing and redeploying to Algeria for the Rif War.

== Second World War ==
=== Influx of recruits ===
The Foreign Legion was heavily involved in World War II, playing a large role in the Middle East and the North African campaign. The 6th Foreign Infantry Regiment was established by consolidating battalions stationed in Syria into a single battalion on October 15, 1939. Around the beginning of the war the primary training camp of the Legion was located at Saïda, however by October 1939, another training camp was established at Bacarès near the Spanish border. The facility at Bacarès was re-purposed as training facility from an internment camp for Spanish refugees from the Spanish Civil War. Foreign Legion Forces being trained at these locations were provided inadequate arms and equipment—mostly surplus World War I-era equipment—which demonstrates the degree of low regard which the Foreign Legion by French military authorities. The 13th Foreign Legion Demi-Brigade was raised in February 1940 for the purpose of deploying to Finland. By February 1940, over 84,000 foreigners had volunteered to serve France which led to great organizational difficulties for the Foreign Legion. During this time a large number of recruits in the Legion were Spanish Republicans and East European Jews, many of whom held their personal ideologies very close to their hearts causing difficulty in their assimilation into the Foreign Legion. Not only did political refugees from Spain and East Europe prove difficult to assimilate into the Legion, but so did many of the reservist, former Legionnaires who returned to the Legion when called up as they were no longer young men and had families to look after. Most of the Foreign Legion remained in training until the Germans launched their offensive against France on May 10, 1940.

=== Battle of France ===
Six units of the Foreign Legion participated in the Battle of France: the 11th Foreign Infantry Regiment, the 12th Foreign Infantry Regiment, the Reconnaissance Group of the 97th Infantry Division, the 21st Marching Regiment of Foreign Volunteers (21st RMVE), the 22nd Marching Regiment of Foreign Volunteers, and the 23rd Marching Regiment of Foreign Volunteers. The 11th REI defended the northern Inor Wood near Verdun from the German offensive early on in the battle until June 11, 1940, when the regiment began a fighting retreat to the south. By June 18, the 11th REI had lost three-fourths of its strength and the regiment withdrew to the south near Toul. The 12th REI was redeployed from its training center in Valbonne on May 11 to defend the Soissons where it arrived on May 24 and eventually began to fortify their positions. The 12 REI first experienced a form of combat for which they were unprepared when on June 5, the town of Soissons was the subject of German strafing from Stukas. By June 8, the 12th REI, in danger of being encircled, received orders to retreat to the south, however the orders did not come soon enough and parts of the 12th REI were surrounded at Soissons; the rest of the 12th REI made their way to Limoges by the signing of Second Armistice at Compiègne on June 25, 1940. By the surrender of France the 12th REI had lost 2,500 of its number. The 21st Marching Regiment of Foreign Volunteers was deployed to the Maginot Line when the German offensive began, but was shifted to the north of Verdun by the end of May. The 21st RMVE took heavy losses during an engagement with the Germans on June 8 and 9; the 21st RMVE joined the rest of the French Army in that sector in retreat when the order to retreat was given. At the time of the armistice the 21st RMVE was at Nancy where it was disarmed by German forces. The 22nd Marching Regiment of the Foreign Volunteers left its training depot at Bacarès on May 6 when it was deployed around Alsace. The German offensive forced the 22nd RMVE to be quickly redeployed on the Somme near the village of Marchélepot where it fought a defensive action from May 22 to May 26. On June 5, the 22nd RMVE was preparing to counterattack the Germans at Villers-Carbonnel alongside the 112th Infantry Division when it came under a heavy preemptive attack launched by German forces in the area. The French Forces were able to initially repulse the attack, but later succumbed to the German onslaught; the force of the Foreign Legion acquitted themselves admirably in that engagement.

=== The Narvik Expedition ===
In January 1940, French high command made the decision to deploy a brigade to assist Finland in its defense against the forces of the Soviet Union in the Winter War. This new force, drawn from the ranks of the Foreign Legion's North African regiments, began the process of formation in February 1940 and was complete by March 27 when it took its new name as the 13th Demi-Brigade of the Foreign Legion. Despite the efficient establishment of the 13th Demi-Brigade of the Foreign Legion, the planned deployment of the unit was set back by the capitulation of Finland on March 12; absent the option to deploy to Finland, the Allies elected to deploy the expeditionary force they were forming for Finland to Norway. The 13th Demi-Brigade trained in Larzac until it shipped out to Scotland where it would deploy with a force assembled by the rest of the Allies. The expeditionary force deployed to northern Norway where it planned to engage the German forces holding Narvik.

On May 13, 1940, the 13th Demi-Brigade participated in an amphibious assault on the shores of the Herjangs Fjord near Narvik. The amphibious assault was conducted on torpedo boats under strafing by German fighters. Once on the shore, Foreign Legion forces moved to secure the high ground around the landing zone.

=== The North African Campaign ===
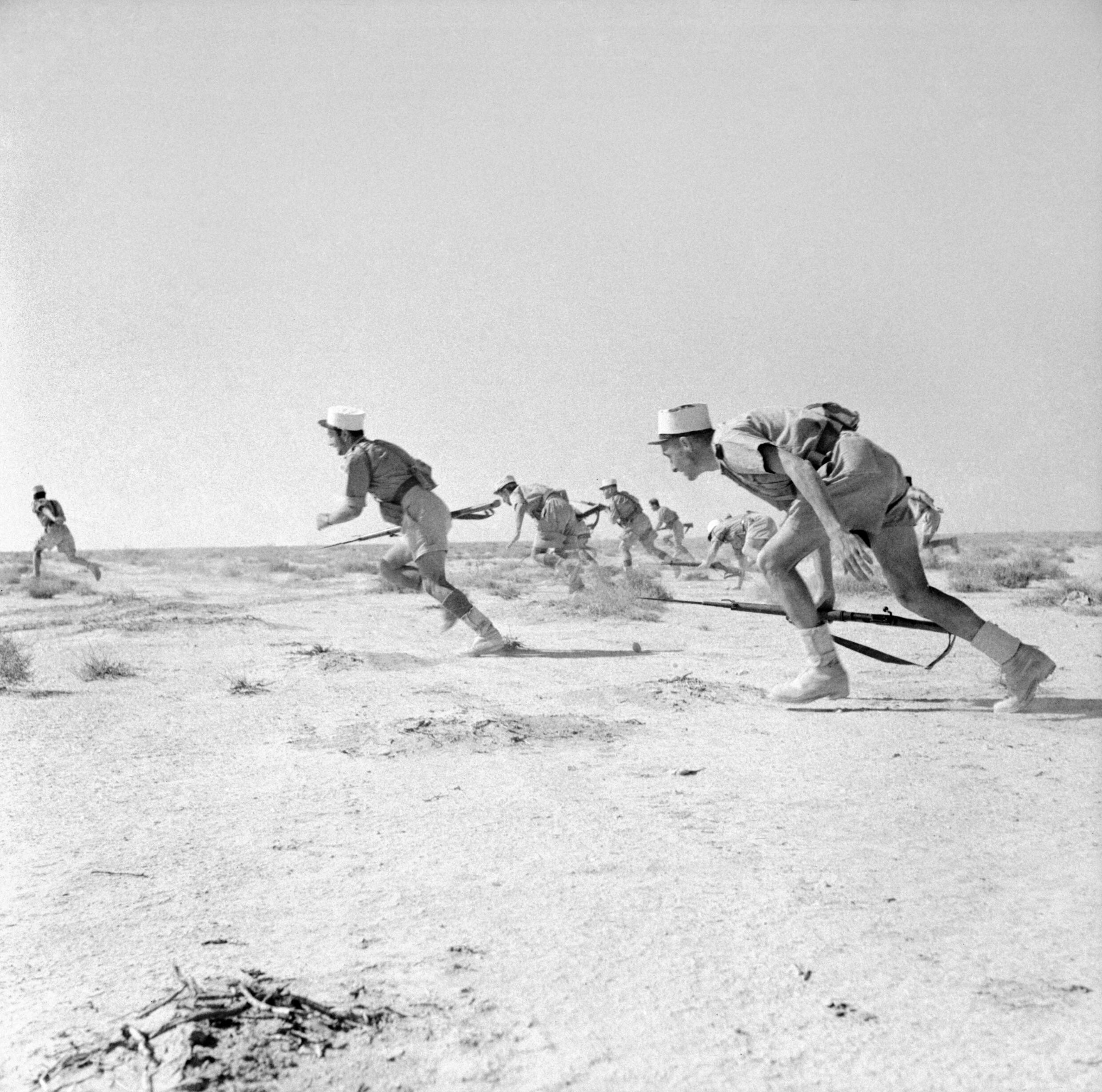
Free French Foreign Legionnaires rush an enemy strong point during the Battle of Bir Hakeim in June 1942.

The 13th Demi-Brigade was deployed in the Battle of Bir Hakeim. Part of the Legion was loyal to the Free French movement, yet another part was loyal to the Vichy government. A battle in Syria saw two opposing sides fight against each other in a short engagement, and later on the Vichy Legion joined its Free French brethren.

== First Indochina War ==
Units of the Legion were involved in the defense of Dien Bien Phu during the First Indochina War and lost a large number of men in the battle. Towards the desperate end of the battle, Legionnaires formed the bulk of the volunteer relief force which were delivered by parachute to the base.

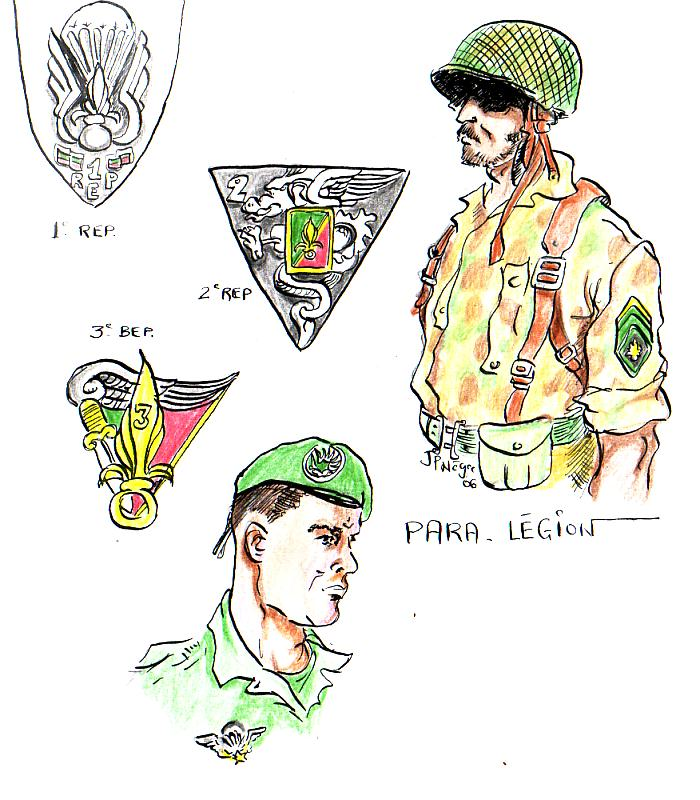
Uniforms of the Foreign Legion paratroopers during the Indochinese war.

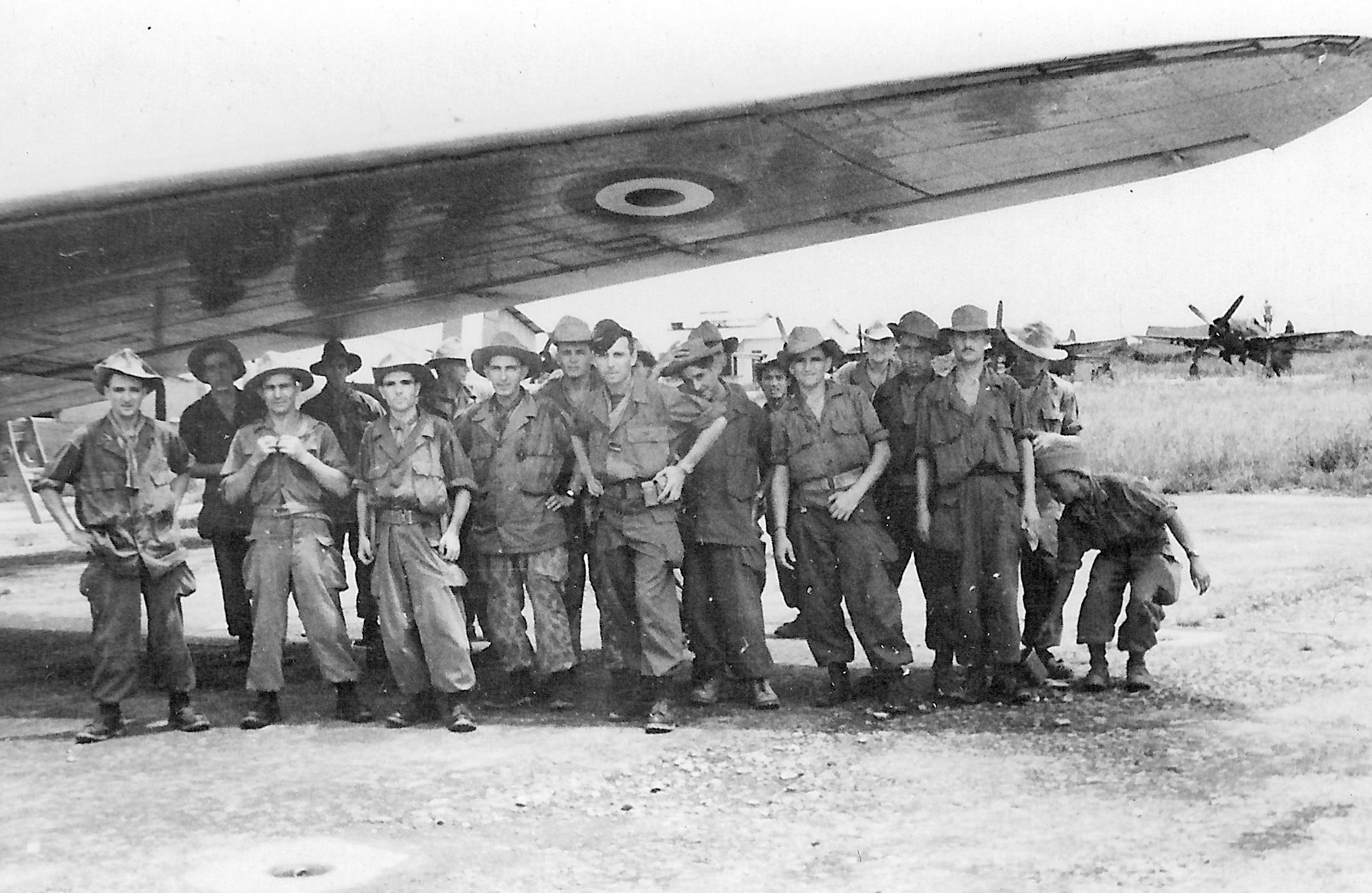
Soldiers of the 2nd Foreign Parachute Battalion standing near a transport plane in French Indochina.

== Post-colonial Sub-Saharan Africa ==
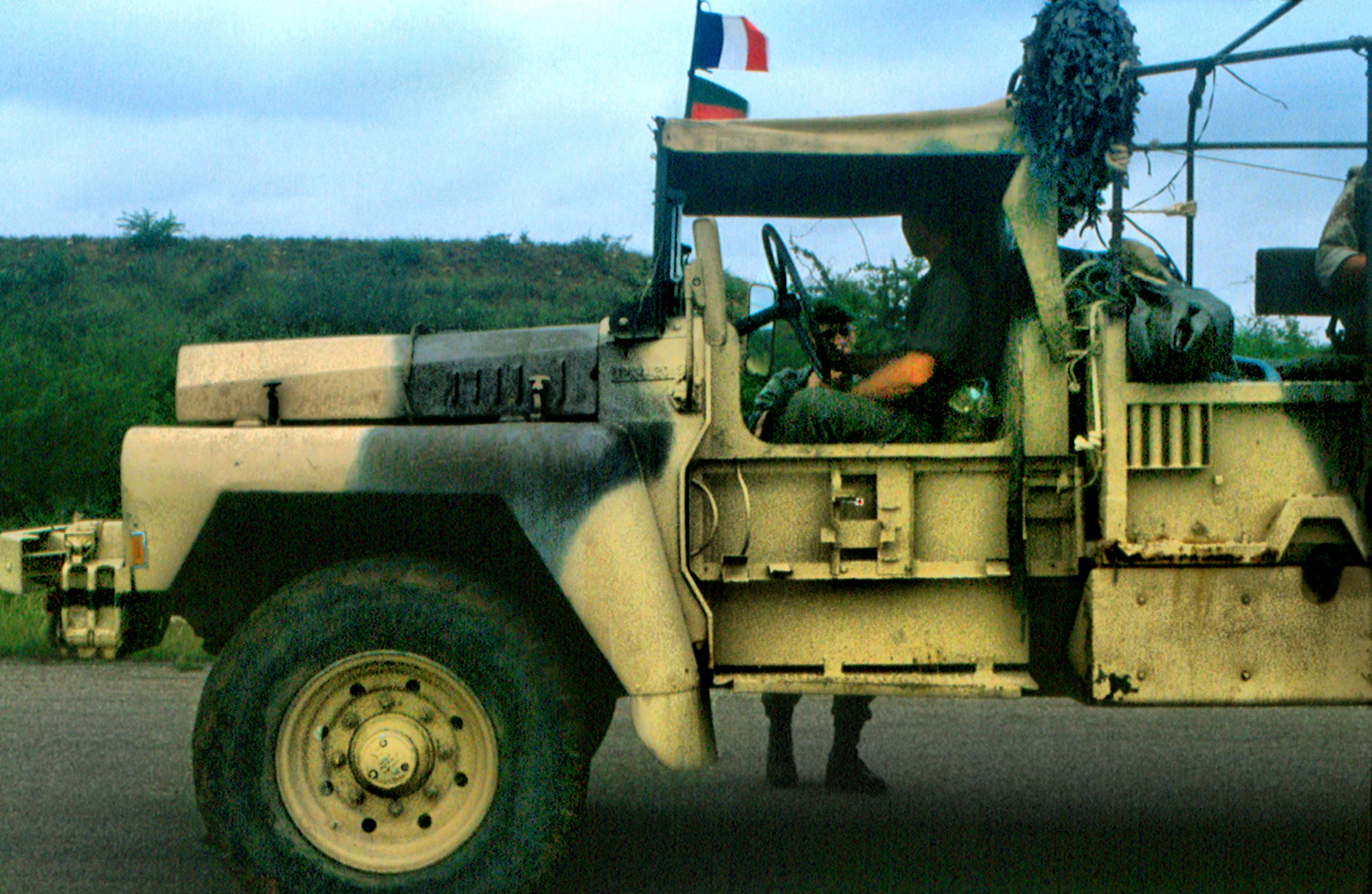
French legionnaires outside of Kismaayo

When the Front for the National Liberation of the Congo (Front de Libération Nationale Congolaise) took hostage approximately 3,000 European civilians at the village of Kolwezi, Zaire in May 1978, the French government deployed six hundreds legionnaires of the 2nd Foreign Parachute Regiment to the region in conjunction with a force of Belgian paratroopers.

== Gulf War ==
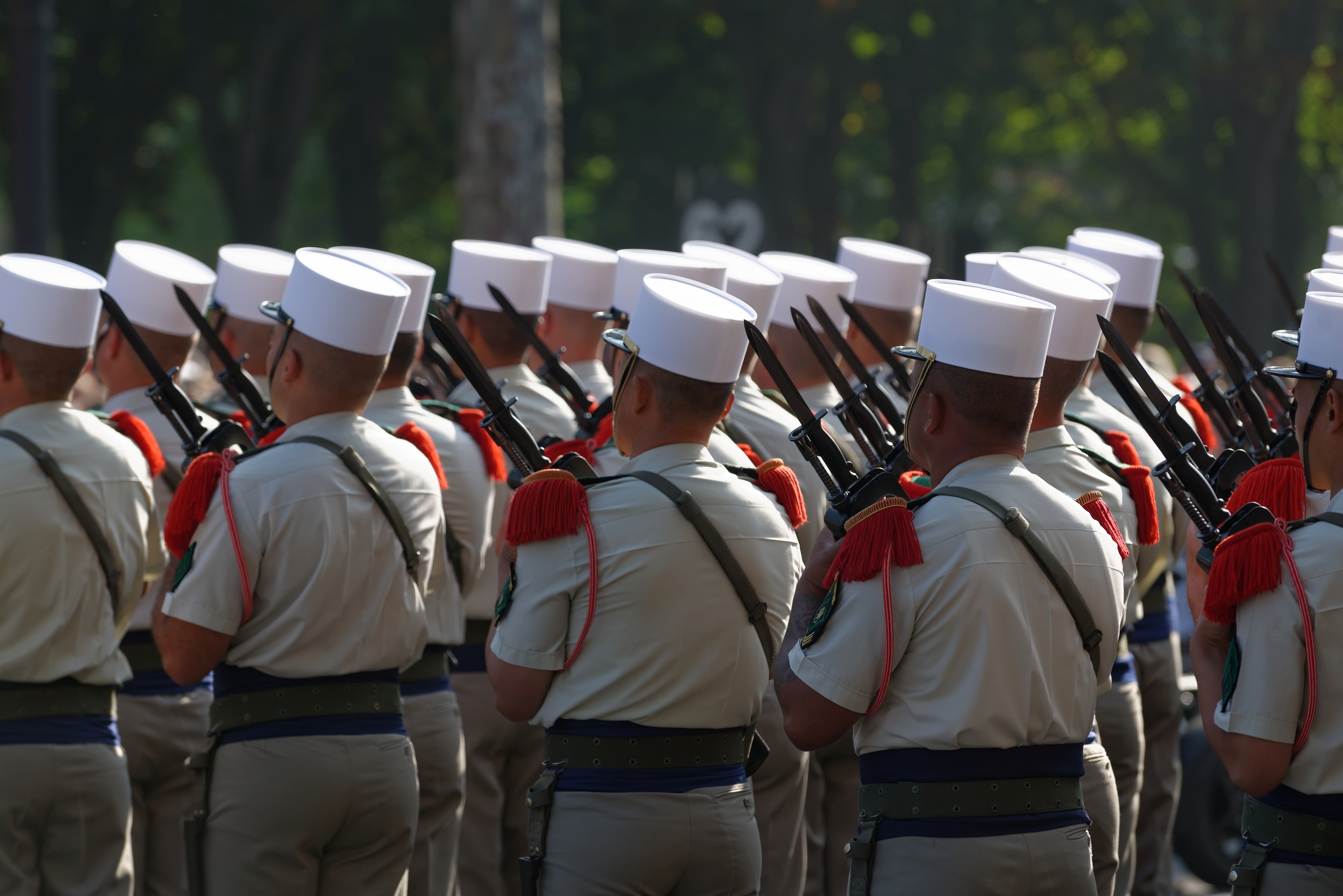
Legionnaires during bastille day military parade

In September 1990 the 2e REI, 6e REG and 1e REC were sent to the Persian Gulf as a part of Opération Daguet. The Legion force, comprising 27 different nationalities, was attached to the French 6th Light Armoured Division, whose mission was to protect the Coalition's left flank.

After the four-week air campaign, coalition forces launched the ground war. They quickly penetrated deep into Iraq, with the Legion taking the Al Salman Airport, meeting little resistance. The war ended after a hundred hours of fighting on the ground, which resulted in very light casualties for the Legion.

== Afghanistan War ==
Elements of the Foreign Legion have been deployed to Afghanistan in support of the NATO-led International Security Assistance Force. Foreign Legion units have participated in ISAF operations in the Kapisa Province and Surobi District.

== Personnel and recruitment ==
The Foreign Legion, unlike other units of the French military which are exclusively male (e.g. submariners), does not prohibit the recruitment of women, but only Susan Travers has ever been selected. A variable number of women serve in support and administrative positions, but their uniforms do not have the traditional attributes (white cap, red epaulettes and green and blue belt).

The countries of origin of legionnaires have been highly correlated with areas experiencing political unrest. A large number of Germans, for example, joined after World War II, as did Poles before, during and after both world wars. The Legion also admits French-speakers of other nationalities, increasing the figures for Belgium and Switzerland.

The official website outlines the Legion's recruitment standards. The age limit ranges from 17 1/2 (with parental consent) to 40 years.

== See also ==
- Military history of France
- French Foreign Legion
- Origins of the French Foreign Legion
- List of French Foreign Legion units
- List of battles involving the French Foreign Legion
