= List of battles involving the French Foreign Legion =

Throughout its long history since its inception on March 9, 1831, elements of the French Foreign Legion have engaged in combat on the behalf of France and its interests with distinction. The Foreign Legion has seen battle on five continents against numerous foes.

== Peacekeeping Operations ==
Date	Battle	Location	Commanding Officer	Result	Casualties	Foreign Legion Units Involved
	Opération Licorne	Côte d'Ivoire		Ended. But legionnaires are still present in the country.		2nd Foreign Infantry Regiment

== Indochina War ==
Date	Battle	Location	Commanding Officer	Result	Casualties	Foreign Legion Units Involved
	Battle of Dien Bien Phu	Dien Bien Phu, French Indochina		Defeat		13th Foreign Legion Demi-Brigade; 2nd Foreign Infantry Regiment; 3rd Foreign Infantry Regiment
November 20–23, 1953	Operation Castor	Dien Bien Phu, French Indochina		French Union Victory		1st Foreign Parachute Battalion

== Second World War ==
Date	Battle	Location	Legion Commanding Officer(s)	Result	Strength	Casualties	Foreign Legion Units Involved
May 26 – June 11, 1942	Battle of Bir Hakeim	Bir Hakeim, Libya	Lieutenant-colonel Dimitri Amilakhvari	Victory; Successful Delaying Action			2nd Battalion of the 13th Demi-Brigade of the Foreign Legion; 3rd Battalion of the 13th Demi-Brigade of the Foreign Legion
September 22–26, 1940	Battle of Lạng Sơn	Lạng Sơn, French Indochina		Defeat; French Forces ordered to Surrender			2nd Battalion of the 5th Foreign Infantry Regiment
	Battle of Narvik	Norway
May 10 – June 25, 1940	Battle of France	France		Defeat			11th Foreign Infantry Regiment; 12th Foreign Infantry Regiment
August 15, 1944	Operation Dragoon	Southern France		Victory; Allied forces successfully landed in southern France			1st Battalion of 13th Demi-Brigade of the Foreign Legion; 2nd Battalion of 13th Demi-Brigade of the Foreign Legion

== Rif War ==
Date	Battle	Location	Legion Commanding Officer(s)	Result	Strength	Casualties	Foreign Legion Units Involved
June 10, 1925	Siege of Mediouna	Mediouna, Morocco		Defeat	40 legionnaires	37 legionnaires	6th Battalion of the 1st Foreign Regiment

== First World War ==
Date	Battle	Location	Legion Commanding Officer(s)	Result	Strength	Casualties	Foreign Legion Units Involved
April 28, 1915	First Battle of Krithia		Lieutenant-colonel Nièger				3rd Battalion, 1st Marching Regiment of Africa
April 25, 1915	Landing at Kum Kale	Kum Kale, Turkey	Lieutenant-colonel Nièger		Approximately 600 men		3rd Battalion, 1st Marching Regiment of Africa

== Sino-French War ==
Date	Battle	Location	Legion Commanding Officer(s)	Result	Strength	Casualties	Foreign Legion Units Involved
	August 1884 – April 1885	Siege of Tuyên Quang	Tuyên Quang, Indochina	Victory	600
March 2, 1882	Battle of Hòa Mộc, Indochina	Tuyên Quang		(France) French Victory			2nd Foreign Legion Battalion; 3rd Foreign Legion Battalion

== Mexican Campaign ==
Date	Battle	Location	Commanding Officer	Result	Strength	Casualties	Foreign Legion Units Involved
April 30, 1863	Battle of Camerone	Camarón de Tejeda, Mexico	Captain Jean Danjou	Defeat; Surviving legionnaires were allowed to leave under their own arms	65 Total; 3 Officers; 62 enlisted	40 dead 17 wounded..	3rd Company of the Foreign Regiment of the Foreign Legion
December 1864 to February 1865	Siege of Oaxaca	Oaxaca, Mexico

== Italian Campaign (1859) ==
Date	Battle	Location	Commanding Officer	Result	Strength	Casualties	Foreign Legion Units Involved
June 4, 1859	Battle of Magenta	Magenta, Italy		Victory
June 24, 1859	Battle of Solferino	Solferino, Italy		Victory			2nd Foreign Regiment

== Crimean War ==
Date	Battle	Location	Commanding Officer	Result	Strength	Casualties	Foreign Legion Units Involved
September 20, 1854	Battle of Alma	Alma River, Russia		Victory		60 men	Eight companies from the 1st and 2nd Regiments of the Foreign Legion
October 17, 1854 – September 9, 1855	Siege of Sevastopol	Sevastopol, Russia	Brigadier Achille Bazaine	Victory			1st Regiment of the Foreign Legion; 2nd Regiment of the Foreign Legion
November 9, 1854	Battle of Inkermann	Sevastopol, Russia		Victory			1st Regiment of the Foreign Legion; 2nd Regiment of the Foreign Legion

== Second Deployment to Algeria ==
Date	Battle	Location	Commanding Officer	Highest Ranking Legion Commander	Result	Strength	Casualties	Foreign Legion Units Involved
1849	Battle of Zaatcha				Victory	5,000

== First Carlist War ==
Date	Battle	Location	Commanding Officer	Highest Ranking Legion Commander	Result	Casualties	Foreign Legion Units Involved
June 2, 1837	Battle of Barbastro			Col. Joseph Conrad	Pyrrhic Victory
May 24, 1837	Battle of Huesca			Col. Joseph Conrad		378 Casualties; 350 legionnaires 28 officers
April 1836	Battle of Zubiri

== First Deployment to Algeria ==
Date	Battle	Location	Commanding Officer	Result	Casualties	Foreign Legion Units Involved
June 28, 1835	Battle of Macta			Defeat
April 24, 1832	Battle of Maison Carrée	Outside of Algiers, Algeria		Victory		3rd Battalion

== See also ==
- History of the French Foreign Legion
- List of Commanders of the French Foreign Legion
