= 1836 in Spain =

- Decades: 1810s; 1820s; 1830s; 1840s; 1850s
- See also: History of Spain; Timeline of Spanish history; List of years in Spain

Events from the year 1836 in Spain.

== Incumbents ==
- Monarch: Isabella II
- Regent: Maria Christina of the Two Sicilies
- Prime Minister -
  - until 15 May - Juan Álvarez Mendizábal
  - 15 May-14 August - Francisco Javier Isturiz y Montero
  - starting 14 August - José María Calatrava y Peinado

== Events ==
- January 16–18 - Battle of Arlabán
- April 26 - Battle of Terapegui
- September 20 - Battle of Villarrobledo
- November 23 - Battle of Majaceite
- December 24 - Battle of Luchana

== Births ==
- February 17: Gustavo Adolfo Bécquer, poet (died 1870)

== See also ==
- First Carlist War
