= 1834 in Spain =

- Decades: 1810s; 1820s; 1830s; 1840s; 1850s
- See also: History of Spain; Timeline of Spanish history; List of years in Spain

Events from the year 1834 in Spain.

== Incumbents ==
- Monarch: Isabella II
- Regent: Maria Christina of the Two Sicilies
- Prime Minister - Francisco Cea Bermudez (until 16 January); Francisco de Paula Martínez de la Rosa y Berdejo (starting 16 January)

== Events ==
- April 22 - Battle of Alsasua
- October 27 - Battle of Alegría de Álava
- October 28 - Battle of Venta de Echavarri
- December 12 - Battle of Mendaza
- December 15 - First Battle of Arquijas

== Deaths ==
- May 17 - Enrique José O'Donnell, Conde de La Bisbal
- Gaspar de Vigodet

== See also ==
- First Carlist War
