= 1837 in Spain =

- Decades: 1810s; 1820s; 1830s; 1840s; 1850s
- See also: History of Spain; Timeline of Spanish history; List of years in Spain

Events from the year 1837 in Spain.

== Incumbents ==
- Monarch: Isabella II
- Regent: Maria Christina of the Two Sicilies
- Prime Minister -
  - until 18 August - José María Calatrava y Peinado
  - 18 August-18 October - Baldomero Espartero
  - 18 October-16 December - Eusebio Bardají y Azara
  - starting 16 December - Narciso Heredia, Count of Ofalia

== Events ==
- March 16 - Battle of Oriamendi
- March 24 - Battle of Huesca
- May 25 - Second Battle of Huesca
- June 2 - Battle of Barbastro
- June 18 - Spanish Constitution of 1812 was repealed, and is replaced by the Spanish Constitution of 1837
- July 15 - Battle of Chiva
- August 24 - Battle of Villar de los Navarros
- September 14 - Battle of Andoain
- September 19 - Battle of Aranzueque

== Births ==
=== Date unknown ===
- Miguel Villalba Hervás, politician, lawyer, journalist and historian (died 1899)

== Deaths ==
- July 27 - Pablo Morillo, military officer (born 1775)
- Pedro Sarsfield, infantry general

== See also ==
- First Carlist War
