= 1838 in Spain =

- Decades: 1810s; 1820s; 1830s; 1840s; 1850s
- See also: History of Spain; Timeline of Spanish history; List of years in Spain

Events from the year 1838 in Spain.

== Incumbents ==
- Monarch: Isabella II
- Regent: Maria Christina of the Two Sicilies
- Prime Minister:
  - until 6 September: Narciso Fernández de Heredia, 2nd Count of Heredia-Spínola
  - 6 September-9 December: Bernardino Fernández de Velasco, 14th Duke of Frías
  - starting 9 December: Isidro de Alaix Fábregas (acting)

== Events ==
- June 20–22 - Battle of Peñacerrada
- October 1 - Battle of Maella

== Births ==
- April 10 - Nicolás Salmerón y Alonso

== Deaths ==
- September 1 - Gabriel de Mendizábal Iraeta
- Francisco Javier Venegas

== See also ==
- First Carlist War
