= 1835 in Spain =

- Decades: 1810s; 1820s; 1830s; 1840s; 1850s
- See also: History of Spain; Timeline of Spanish history; List of years in Spain

Events from the year 1835 in Spain.

== Incumbents ==
- Monarch - Isabella II
- Regent - Maria Christina of the Two Sicilies
- Prime Minister -
  - until 7 June - Francisco de Paula Martínez de la Rosa y Berdejo
  - 7 June-14 September - José María Queipo de Llano Ruiz de Saravia, 7th Count of Toreno
  - 14 September-25 September - José María Queipo de Llano Ruiz de Saravia, 7th Count of Toreno
  - starting 25 September - Juan Álvarez Mendizábal

== Events ==
- 5 February - Second Battle of Arquijas
- 20–22 April - Battle of Artaza
- 28 April - Lord Eliot Convention
- 16 July - Battle of Mendigorría

== Births ==
- 13 March - José Ferrer, guitarist and composer (d. 1916)
- 30 March - Francisco de Paula Martínez, Spanish zoologist (d. 1908)

== Deaths ==
- 7 March - Manuel Freire de Andrade
- 24 June - Tomás de Zumalacárregui

== See also ==
- First Carlist War
