= Joseph Conrad (disambiguation) =

Joseph Conrad (1857–1924) was a Polish-British novelist.

Joseph Conrad may also refer to:

- Joseph Conrad (French colonel) (1788–1837), French colonel killed in action at the Battle of Barbastro
- Joseph Conrad (general) (1830–1897), American Civil War general
- Joe Conrad (1930–2018), American golfer
- Joseph Conrad (ship), an 1882 museum ship
