= Joseph Bernelle =

French Army officer

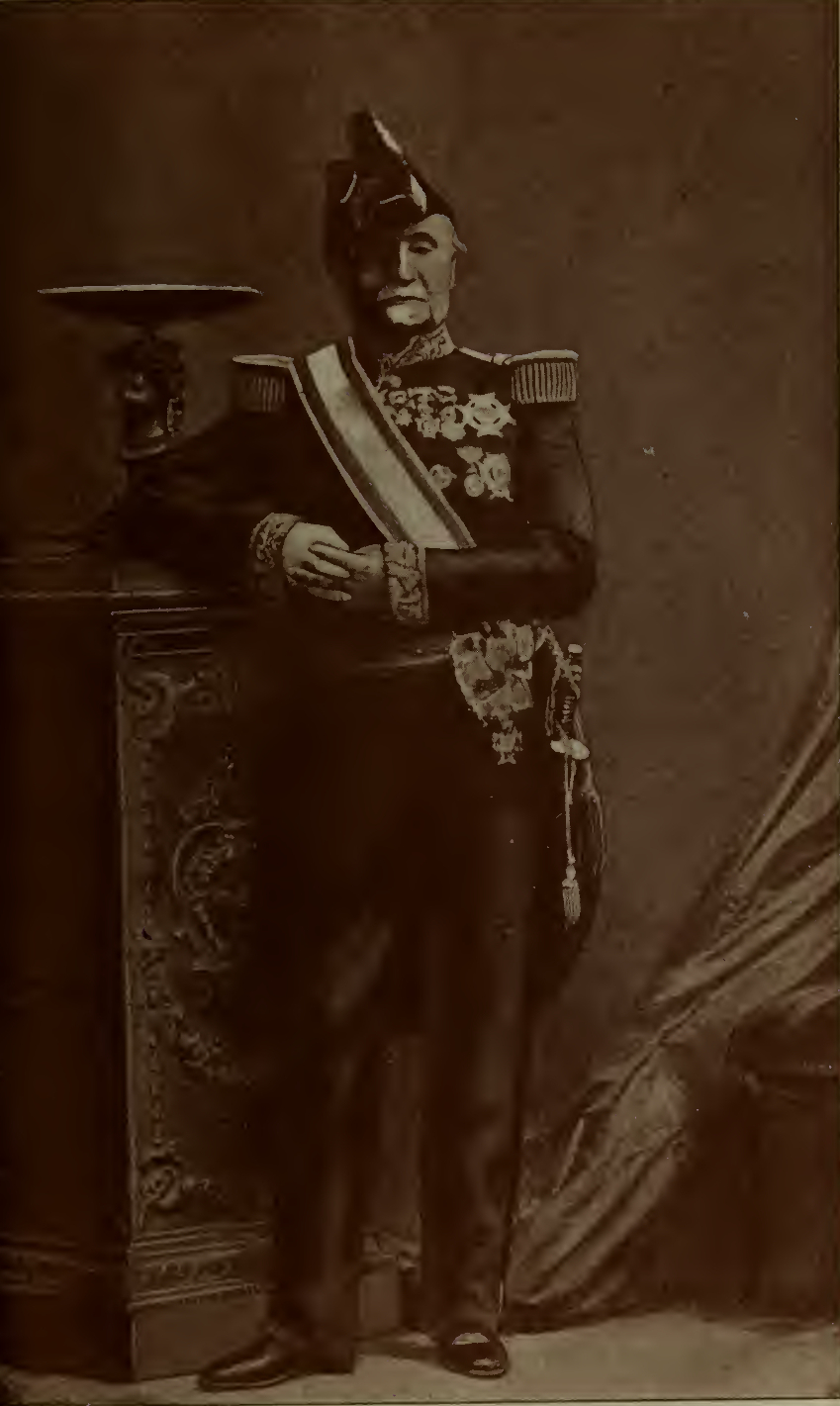
Portrait of French General Joseph Bernelle

Joseph Bernelle (5 October 1785 Versailles, France Versailles, France 7 January 1871 Paris, France) was a French Army officer who commanded the French Foreign Legion during the Carlist War.

== Early years and Grande Armée service ==
He was born in 1785 to General Pierre-Antoine and his wife, Lady Marguerite Desnoyers. He entered the École spéciale militaire de Saint-Cyr in 1801 and was commissioned as sous-lieutenant in 1803. He participated in the Italian Campaigns of the French Consulate and First French Empire from 1811. He was present at the Battle of Waterloo. He eventually obtained the rank of Chef de brigade or Colonel and Aide de Camp to General Curial.

== The Foreign Legion ==
In 1830 the French invaded Algeria and disbanded the seven regiments of Swiss and Germans in the French Army. The Legion was formed on 10 March 1831. The Legion was initially formed of the following battalions.

- 1st, 2nd and 3rd - trained ex-soldiers from the Swiss and Hohenlohe regiments.
- 4th - Spanish (disbanded in Feb 1834 to release them for service at home in the First Carlist War)
- 5th - Sardinians and Italians
- 6th - Dutch and Belgians
- 7th/4th - Poles (not completed until February 1834, whereupon it replaced the Spanish 4th.

In Spring of 1835, the French Government handed the use of the Legion to the Spanish Government in order to fight Don Carlos. Colonel Bernelle was given command and the local rank of General. He landed his troops on 17 August 1835 at Tarragona, where he had command of 123 officers and 4,000 men. He soon disbanded the nationally organized battalions and embraced the policy of amalgamation, with French as a common tongue. It 1836, Bernelle organized an artillery battery and three squadrons of Polish Lancers. On 24 May 1836, Bernelle and his men, " attacked Carlists threatening the garrison at Zubiri, northeast of Pamplona near Larrasoaña. Fighting in heavy snow the Carlists were driven off with over 100 casualties, and 30 prisoners executed as a reprisal...." On 26 April, they defeated another Carlist force at the Battle of Terapegui, and again at 2nd Zubiri. Despite his successes, Bernelle was withdrawn 'due to complains about the neglect of his men. He was relieved by Colonel Joseph Conrad who was killed in action by the Carlists on 2 June 1837 at the Battle of Barbastro.
