= 1839 in Spain =

- Decades: 1810s; 1820s; 1830s; 1840s; 1850s
- See also: History of Spain; Timeline of Spanish history; List of years in Spain

Events from the year 1839 in Spain.

== Incumbents ==
- Monarch: Isabella II
- Regent: Maria Christina of the Two Sicilies
- Prime Minister: Isidro de Alaix Fábregas (until 3 February), Evaristo Pérez de Castro y Brito (starting 3 February)

== Events ==
- May 12 - Battle of Ramales
- November 10 - The first known photograph taken in Spain is taken at the Pla de Palau, Barcelona

== Births ==
- February 18 – Pascual Cervera y Topete, Spanish admiral (d. 1909)
- September 7 – Patricio Montojo y Pasarón, Spanish admiral (d. 1917)

== Deaths ==
- Carlos de España

== See also ==
- First Carlist War
