= Mendaza =

Municipality of Spain

Coordinates: 42°38′34″N 2°14′5″W

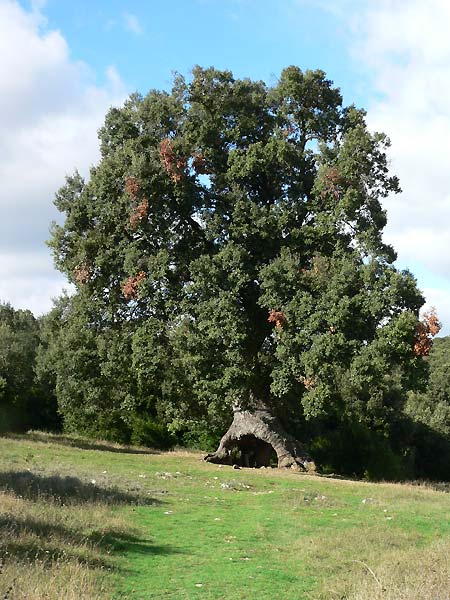
Mendaza is the location of the ancient tree known as the Encina de las Tres Patas de Mendaza, a 1,200-year old Holm Oak. Tres Patas means "three leg."

Mendaza is a town and municipality located in the province and autonomous community of Navarre, northern Spain. The Battle of Mendaza took place here in 1834.
