= Battle of Arlabán =

Armed confrontation during the First Carlist War from January 16 to 18, 1836

Coordinates: 42°58′38″N 2°34′17″W

- Part of First Carlist War
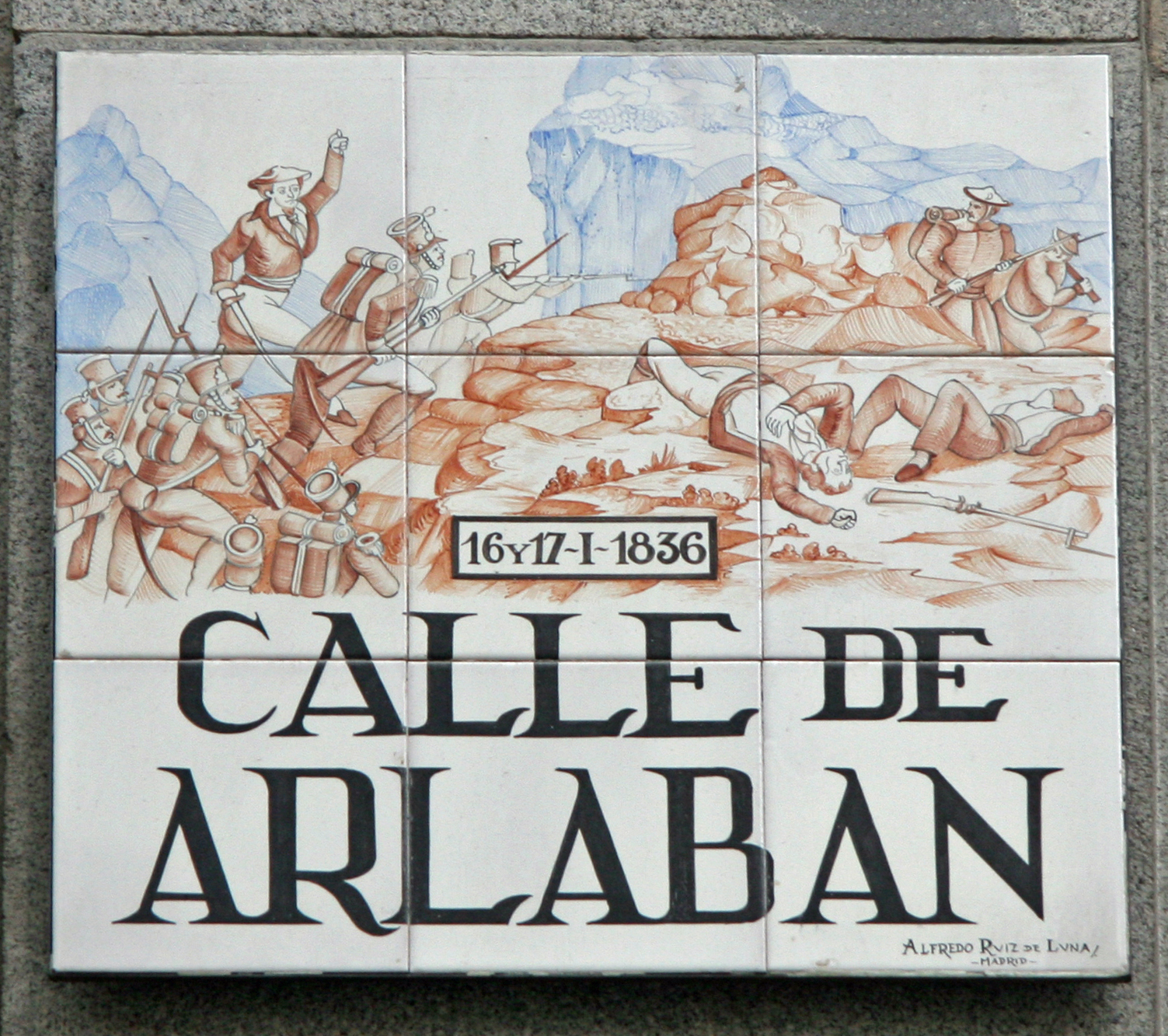
- Street sign in Madrid commemorating battle.
Date	16–18 January 1836
Location	Arlabán, Basque Country, Spain
Result	Indecisive (both parties claimed victory)

Belligerents
Carlists supporting Infante Carlos of Spain	Liberals (Isabelinos or Cristinos) supporting Isabella II of Spain and her regent mother Maria Christina

Commanders and leaders
	Luis Fernández de Córdova; Baldomero Espartero

The Battle of Arlabán, a battle of the First Carlist War, occurred at the heights of Arlabán, between the provinces of Álava and Guipúzcoa. Between 16 and 17 January 1836, the Liberals occupied Arlaban after dislodging the Carlist forces there. The Liberals were commanded by Luis Fernández de Córdova and were supported by the British Legion, French Legion, and units commanded by Baldomero Espartero; the forces were divided along three fronts. After conquering Arlabán as well as Legutiano (Villarreal de Álava), however, the Liberals were pushed back by the Carlists on 18 January, suffering a large number of casualties.
