= Second Battle of Arquijas =

Battle of the First Carlist War

Coordinates: 42.6461°N 2.4125°W

- Part of First Carlist War
Date	5 February 1835
Location	Arquijas, Navarre, Spain
Result	Carlist victory: Liberal forces repulsed

Belligerents
Carlists supporting Infante Carlos of Spain	Liberals (Isabelinos or Cristinos) supporting Isabella II of Spain and her regent mother Maria Christina

Commanders and leaders
Tomas de Zumalacarregui; Officers included Ituralde, Guibelalde, Villareal, Gomez	Manuel Lorenzo; Manuel Lorenzo, Marcelino de Oraá Lecumberri, and 3 other generals

Strength
8,500	14,000

Casualties and losses
	Heavy

The Second Battle of Arquijas (5 February 1835) was a battle of the First Carlist War. It followed the First Battle of Arquijas. The battle was a second attack on the positions of Carlist commander Tomás de Zumalacárregui at the pass at Arquijas, Navarre.

Liberal commander Francisco Espoz y Mina sent 5,000 infantry and cavalrymen into the field. 9,000 Liberal troops were at Estella under Manuel Lorenzo, Marcelino de Oraá Lecumberri, and three other generals. Espoz y Mina gave orders for the passage of the Ega River at Arquijas.

Meanwhile, Zumalacárregui had 8,500 men. His generals were Ituralde, Guibelalde, Villareal, and Miguel Gómez Damas.

On 5 February Liberal forces took posts opposite the Carlists on the other bank of the Ega River. They then attacked at several points, but were repulsed, suffering heavy casualties. They retreated to their entrenched towns.
