= Marcelino de Oraá Lecumberri =

Spanish general, politician and Philippine colonial administrator

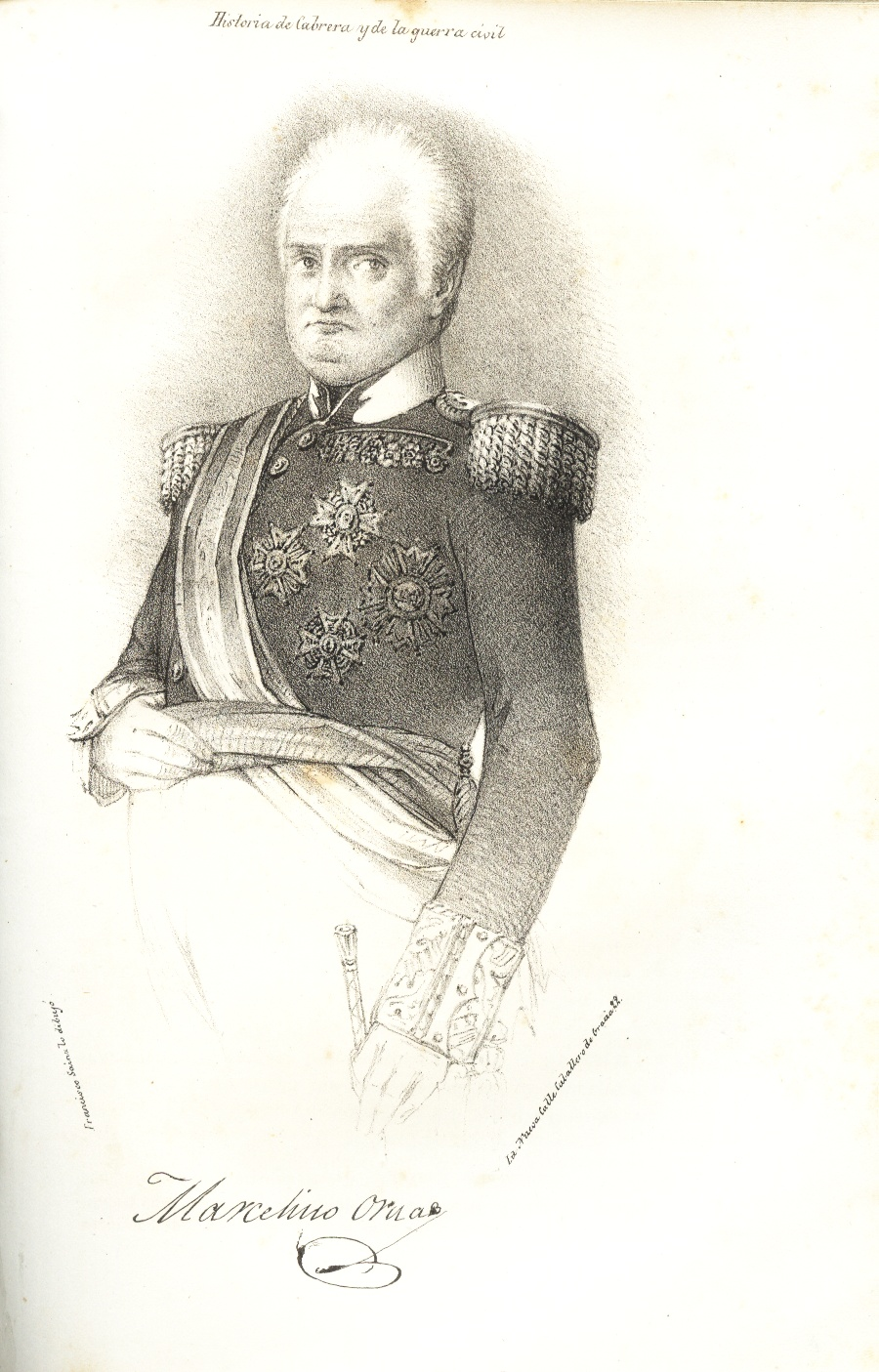
Marcelino de Oraá

Marcelino de Oraá Lecumberri (1788–1851) was a Spanish military man and administrator. Born in Beriáin in Navarre, he distinguished himself as a cadet during the War of Spanish Independence. He was married to Josefa de Erice, later Condesa de Chiva y Vizcondesa de Oráa.

== Biography ==
He later fought in the First Carlist War on the government side, leading a column as colonel. He became a general in 1834 and field marshal in 1836. He participated in the battles of Arquijas, Mendaza and Luchana. He showed great skill and judgment in these battles, and his involvement at Arquijas was critical. Vicente Blasco Ibáñez has written:

One has to recognize that in the battle at Arquijas, the victory would have been the Carlists' had it not been for the skill and daring of Oraá, who knew how to extricate himself from a dire situation, as General Córdova had shown lamentable irresolution retreating from the battlefield before hostilities had ceased.

He served as Governor-General of the Philippines from 14 February 1841 to 17 June 1843. He put down two rebellions in the Philippines, led by Apolinario de la Cruz (Hermano Pule) and Sergeant Irineo Samaniego, respectively.

He returned to Spain and served as a senator. He died at his natal town. His works include Memoria histórica de la conducta militar y política del General Oráa (Madrid 1851).
