= Battle of Peñacerrada =

Battle of the First Carlist War

Coordinates: 42.6442°N 2.7133°W

- Part of First Carlist War
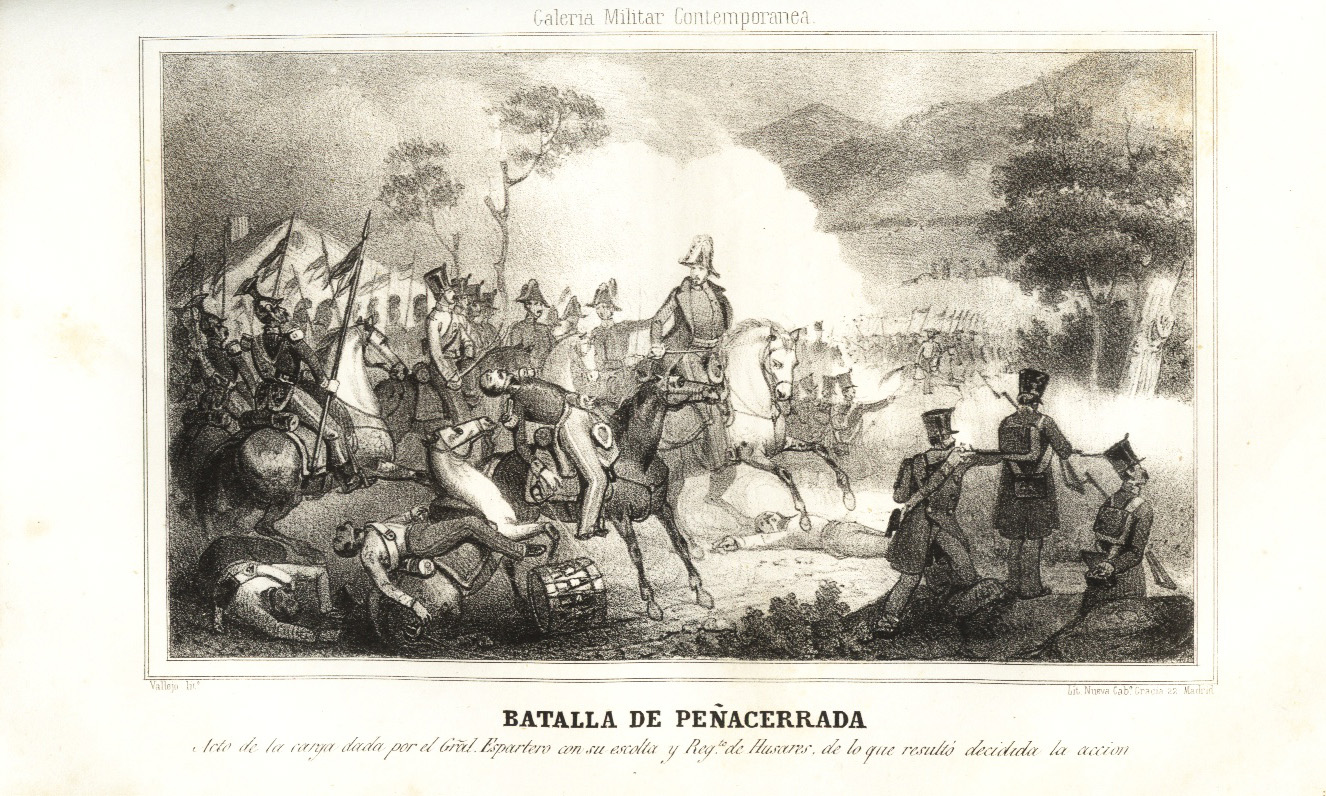
Date	20–22 June 1838
Location	Peñacerrada, Basque Country, Spain
Result	Liberal victory

Belligerents
Carlists supporting Infante Carlos of Spain	Liberals (Isabelinos or Cristinos) supporting Isabella II of Spain and her regent mother Maria Christina

Commanders and leaders
	Pedro Saarsfield; Manuel Lorenzo

Strength
1,500	

The Battle of Peñacerrada, a battle of the First Carlist War, occurred at Peñacerrada (Urizaharra) on June 20–22, 1838. The Liberals were commanded by Pedro Saarsfield and Manuel Lorenzo, who had crossed the Ebro after the Battle of Los Arcos. They routed 1,500 Carlist troops situated at Peñecerrada. Saarsfield and Lorenzo entered Vitoria-Gasteiz and Bilbao within a week without encountering resistance.
