= Miguel Villalba Hervás =

Spanish politician, lawyer and historian (1837 - 1899)

Miguel Villalba Hervás (1837–1899) was a Spanish politician, lawyer, journalist, historian and Mason. He was born in La Orotava, Tenerife, in the Canary Islands on December 12, 1837, and died in Madrid in 1899. He was one of the leading figures of republicanism in Tenerife.

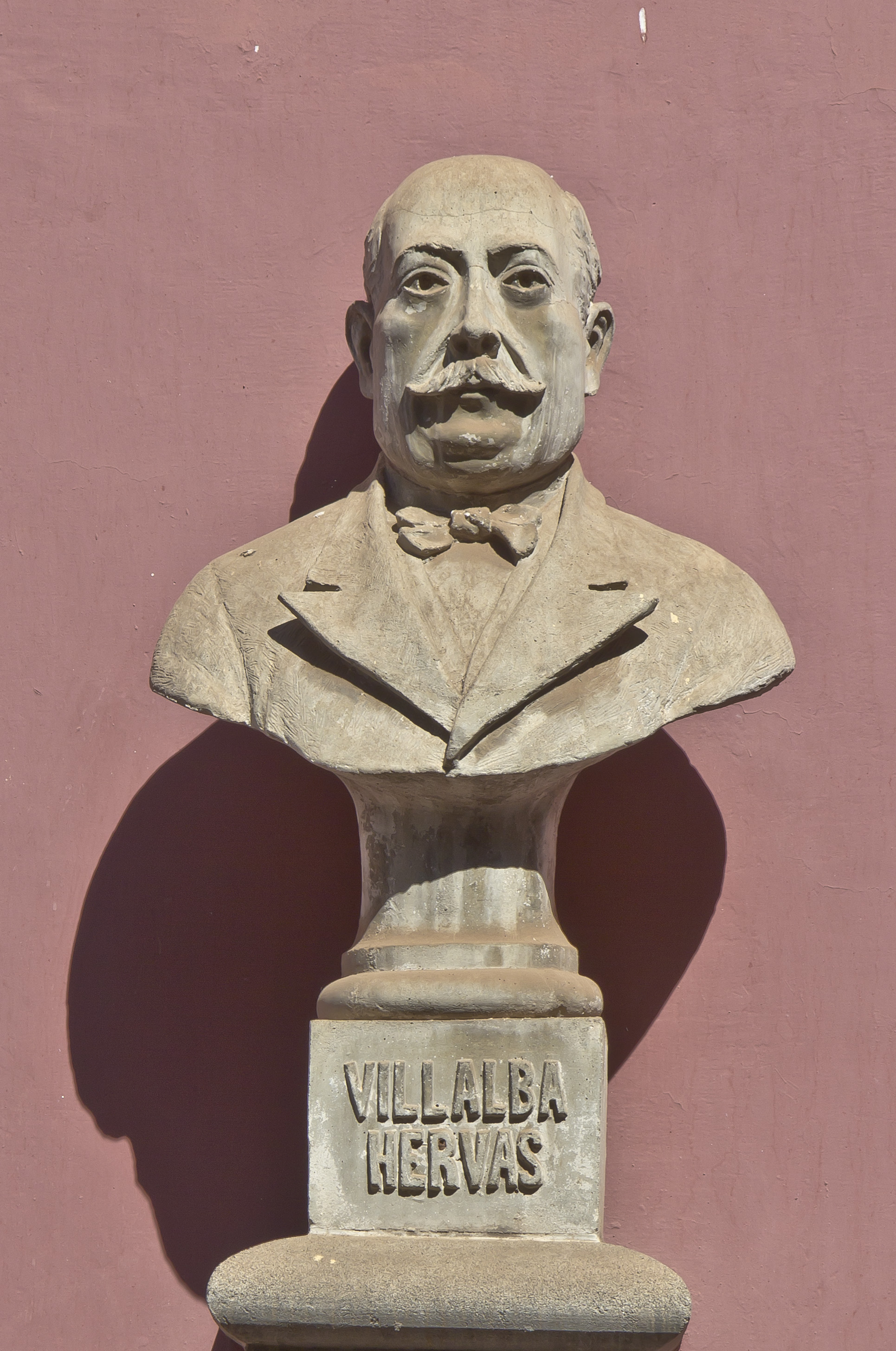
Villalba Hervás

== Career ==
Miguel Villalba Hervás served as librarian of the Society of La Esperanza in La Orotava in his youth, and led several newspapers in Santa Cruz de Tenerife. He moved to Madrid, where he replaced Nicolás Salmerón at the head of the La Justicia newspaper. He joined the Revolutionary Council in September 1868, for which he was deported to Gran Canaria.

In 1871 he was elected member of the Provincial Council, and during the First Spanish Republic he served as civil governor in the Canary Islands in 1872. Despite embracing republicanism, and not without some misgivings, he joined the Restoration, but over time was critical of the corruption and other aspects of the system.

He was elected deputy of Tenerife in 1881 and 1886, under the Sagasta administrations. From 1891 he left the more active politics and focused on the practice of law and journalism. He began writing at this time a book on the history of Spain from the reign of Elizabeth II and the war in Cuba and the Philippines. He was instrumental in the development of Freemasonry in the Canary Islands in the final third of the nineteenth century, becoming grade 33 of the Scottish Ancient and Accepted Rite and Venerable Master of the Teide Lodge, Tenerife's most important at the time.

== Works ==
- Recuerdos de cinco lustros (Memories of five decades)
- Una década sangrienta (A bloody decade)
- Ruiz de Padrón y su tiempo (Ruiz de Padrón and his time)
- De Alcolea a Sagunto (From Alcolea to Saguntum) - incomplete
