= First Battle of Arquijas =

Battle of the First Carlist War

Coordinates: 42.6461°N 2.4125°W

- Part of First Carlist War
Date	15 December 1834
Location	Arquijas, Navarre, Spain
Result	Carlist victory

Belligerents
Carlists supporting Infante Carlos of Spain	Liberals (Isabelinos or Cristinos) supporting Isabella II of Spain and her regent mother Maria Christina

Commanders and leaders
Tomás de Zumalacárregui; General Ituralde	Luis Fernández de Córdova; Marcelino de Oraá Lecumberri

Casualties and losses
1,000 wounded; 300 dead	1,300 casualties

The First Battle of Arquijas (December 15, 1834) was a battle of the First Carlist War.

== Opening shots ==
The battle began when Liberal forces found Carlist general Tomás de Zumalacárregui waiting at the bridge of Arquijas over the Ega River in Navarre; about the middle of the day, some gunshots were exchanged between the several advanced posts.

== Battle at the bridge ==
The Liberals under Luis Fernández de Córdova attempted to force this bridge. The division of Cordova formed itself in order of battle near the hermitage of Arquijas (Ermita de Nuestra Señora de Arquijas), which commanded the rapids near the bridge. Artillery was stationed by the Liberals near this spot to protect the passage of the Liberal forces. A column of picked men, composed of carabiniers and peseteros, attempted to cross the bridge.

The Carlist Fourth Battalion of Navarre, reinforced by the tercios of Guipuzcoa, protecting the bridge, threw the Liberals back. "A few of the most adventurous [Liberal soldiers] succeeded, with great trouble, in gaining the opposite bank; but soon the bridge was covered with carcasses, and, despite all their efforts, they could not advance a step further."

== Oraá's Feign ==
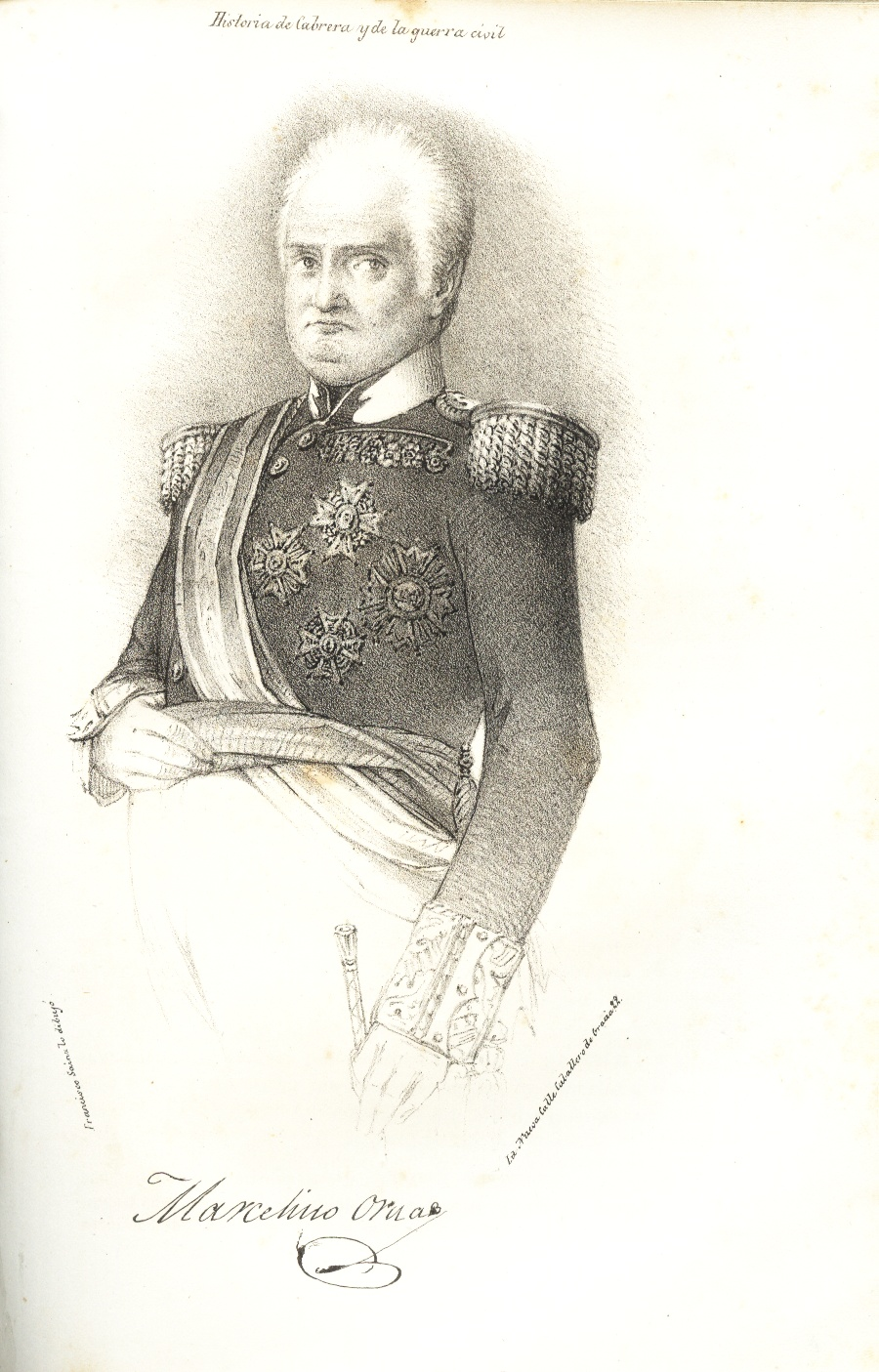
Marcelino de Oraá Lecumberri

Córdova decided to attempt passage at another point, and gave orders to Marcelino de Oraá Lecumberri to get, by a concealed march, into the rear of the Carlists, and to General Lopez, to feign a similar movement, thereby distracting the Carlists. There were about 2,000 troops under Liberal general Oraá that had been detached by Córdova and sent to attack the Carlist rear.

The Liberals' leading column, led by Oraá, advanced against the Carlist center, leaving another division to oppose the Carlist right wing.

Sources disagree on what happened next. One source states that Zumalacárregui sent Ituralde's advanced guard, which had not yet seen action, to counter this rearguard action. Another states that Ituralde, "urged by an inconsiderate ardour which overcame his judgment, brought forward into sight his four battalions." These battalions, forming the left wing, had been concealed from view by the hill beneath which they were stationed.

Oraá instantly saw the snare into which he was about to fall, and changed his line of advance from north to west, moving directly upon Ituralde's division, throwing out at the same time two battalions so as to outflank him. The Carlist left wing, thus enveloped and outnumbered, was driven back in confusion.

== Zumalacárregui's intervention ==
Zumalacárregui then supported Ituralde, leaving only 2 or 3 battalions in observation; Zumalacárregui hastily marched to support his left wing under Ituralde. The Liberals had already compelled Ituralde to retreat. However, Zumalacárregui's unexpected reinforcement threw the Liberals into disorder. The Liberals gave way, falling back on their second line.

One source states that "it is said that, at this juncture, Cordova, believing the day to be lost, gave Oraa orders to retreat; the latter, however, more experienced in such affairs, took upon himself the responsibility of disregarding the order." Córdova did in fact retreat in disorder, abandoning the division.

The division, under Oraá, found itself opposed to Ituralde in the valley of Lana.

A 5-hour long combat followed.

The sources again disagree on what happened next. One source states that Oraá attacked but his detachment of over 2,000 men was dispersed in the Lana valley and fled, the nighttime covering their retreat. However, another source states that “the superiority of position and numbers had given the [Liberals] an advantage against which the Carlists found it impossible to contend.”

"One has to recognize that in the battle at Arquijas," Vicente Blasco Ibáñez has written, "the victory would have been the Carlists' had it not been for the skill and daring of Oráa, who knew how to extricate himself from a dire situation, as General Córdova had shown lamentable irresolution retreating from the battlefield before hostilities had ceased."

== Aftermath ==
Córdova was replaced by Manuel Lorenzo as a result of this defeat. Córdova had withdrawn to Los Arcos, where he got orders from Espoz y Mina to quit his command and go to Madrid.

On February 5, 1835, the Liberals attacked the same spot at the Second Battle of Arquijas but were repulsed.

== Scheme of the battle ==

^^^^^(1)^^^^^^^^^^^^^^^^^^^^^^^^^^^^^^^^^^^^^^^^^^^^^^^^^^^^^^^^^^^^^^^^
                              (2)       ^^              (3)
                                    ^^^^^^^^^^^^^^^^^(4)^^^^^^^^^^^^^^^^
                          (5)  (6) (7)  (8) ^^    (9)     ^^^^^^(4)^^^^^
                                    ^^^(10)^^^^^^   ^^^^^^^^^^^^^^^^(4)^
^^^^^^^^^^^^^^^^^^^                 ^^^^^^^^^^^^^   ^^^^^^^^^^^^^^^^(4)^

^^^^^(11)^^^^^^^^^^^^^^^^^^(12)^^^^^^^(13)^^^^^^^^^^^^^(14)^^^^^^^^^^^^^^^^^^^^^(15) (16)^^^^^^^^^^^^^^^^^^(17)^^^^^^(18)^^^^^^^^^^^^^^^ ^^^^^^^^^^^^^^^^^^^^^

                                               (19)^^
                                                   ^^
                                               (20)^^

(1) Sierra de Andía. (2) Valle de Aralar. (3) Valle de Amescoa Alta. (4) Sierra de Lóquiz. (5) Orbiso. (6) Zúñiga. (7) Cerro Eternidad. (8) Valle de Barabia. (9) Valle de Lana. (10) Peña La Gallina. (11) Río Ega. (12) Puente Santa Cruz Campezu. (13) Puente de Arquijas. (14) Puente de Lana. (15) Santa Cruz de Campezu. (16) Acedo. (17) Puerto de Aguilar. (18) Sierra de Codés. (19) Valle de La Berrueza. (20) Los Arcos
