= Battle of Mendaza =

Battle of the First Carlist War

Coordinates: 42°38′11″N 2°14′55″W

- Part of First Carlist War
Date	12 December 1834
Location	Mendaza, Navarre, Spain
Result	Liberal victory

Belligerents
Carlists supporting Infante Carlos of Spain	Liberals (Isabelinos or Cristinos) supporting Isabella II of Spain and her regent mother Maria Christina

Commanders and leaders
Tomás de Zumalacárregui	Luis Fernández de Córdova; Marcelino Oráa

The Battle of Mendaza was an early battle of the First Carlist War, occurring on December 12, 1834, at Mendaza, Navarre.

The Carlists had enjoyed a victory in the Battle of Venta de Echavarri in October and also the fruits of a raid on Navarre, in which Tomás de Zumalacárregui would station himself at La Berrueza with a number of supplies, clothes, money, and new troops. The morale of the Carlists was very high, and they decided to fight the Liberal troops in a formal battle (rather than with guerrilla tactics). This would happen on December 14, 1834, at the Battle of Mendaza.

Tomás de Zumalacárregui concentrated his forces at the bottom of the valley of La Berrueza between Mendaza and Asarta.

Luis Fernández de Córdova's forces were stationed outside of this valley, at Los Arcos.

Zumalacárregui attempted to follow a plan of battle similar to that enacted by Hannibal at Cannae: he would allow enemy forces to drive themselves into a large arc — whereupon the Carlist infantry, positioned on the flanks in the forests of Holm oaks on the mountain of Dos Hermanas, would encircle the main body of Liberal infantry and destroy it.

However, the Liberal leader of the vanguard, Marcelino Oráa, himself a Navarrese and familiar with the terrain, recognized the potential trap and instead marched towards Mendaza rather than through the valley itself. The Carlists, surprised by this maneuver and inexperienced on the field of battle, were thrown back and retreated, taking refuge in the mountains.

== Sources ==
First hand accounts:

- C.F. Henningsen. Campaña de doce meses en Navarra y las Provincias Vascongadas con el General Zumalacárregui. Madrid 1935
- Alexis Sabatier. Tío Tomás. Souvenirs d'un soldat de Charles V. Chez Granet. Bordeaux 1836
- Juan Antonio Zaratiegui. Vida y hechos de D. Tomás de Zumalacárregui. Escelicer, S.L. San Sebastián 1946
- Fernando Fernández de Córdova. Mis memorias íntimas. Madrid 1886–1889
- Luis Fernández de Córdova. Memoria justificativa... París 1837
- Marcelino Oráa. Conducta militar y política del Teniente General D. Marcelino Oraá... Madrid 1847

Secondary:

- Antonio Pirala. Historia de la guerra carlista y de los partidos liberal y carlista. Segunda edición. Madrid 1867–1871
- José M. Azcona. Zumalacárregui. Estudio crítico de las fuentes históricas de su tiempo. Instituto de Estudios Políticos. Madrid 1946
- Francisco de Paula Madrazo. Historia militar y política de Zumalacárregui. Librería Santarén. Valladolid 1941
- Isidoro Magués. Don Carlos e i suoi Difensori. Firenze. Batelli e Figli 1837
- Benjamín Jarnés. Zumalacárregui. El caudillo romántico. Madrid 1972
