= Luis Fernández de Córdova =

Spanish general and diplomat (1798 – 1840)

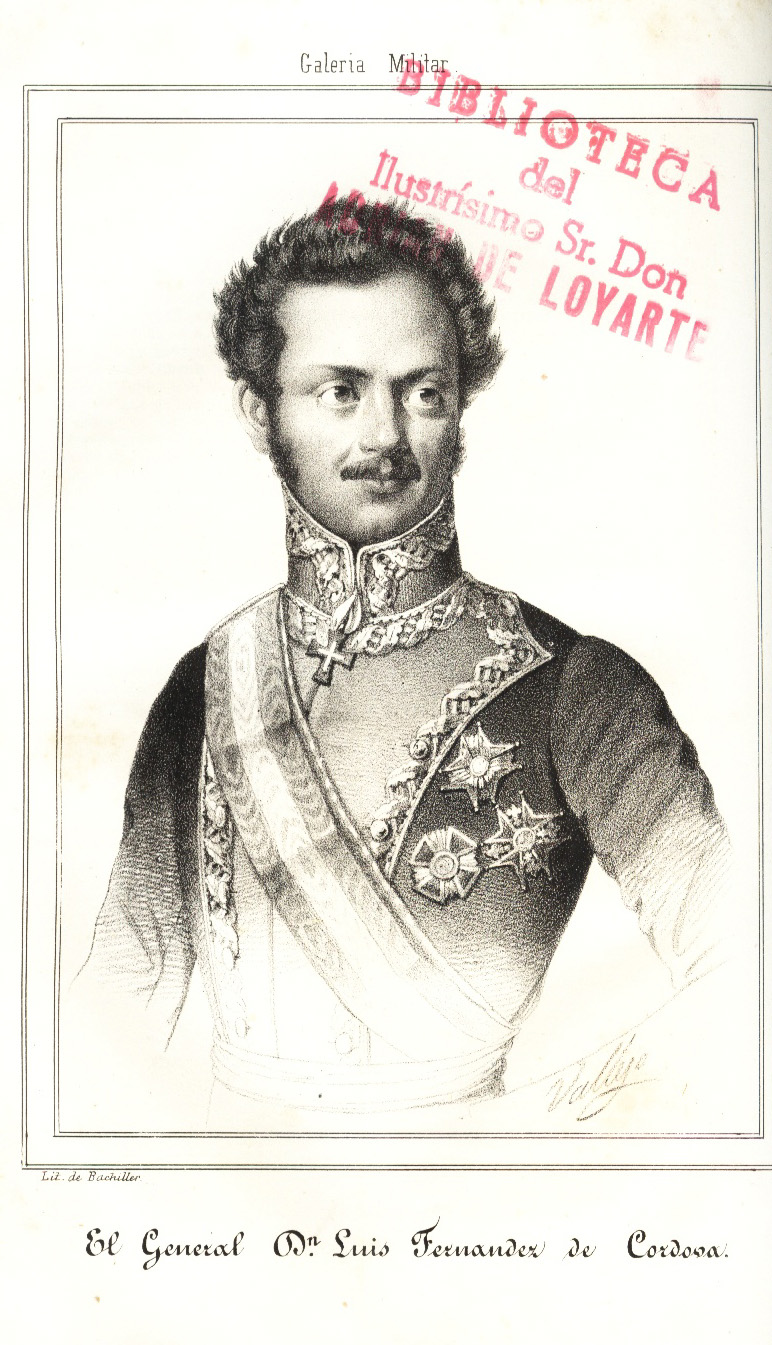
Luis Fernández de Córdova

Luis Fernández de Córdova (or Córdoba) (August 2, 1798 in San Fernando, Cádiz – April 22, 1840 in Lisbon) was a Spanish military general, diplomat and first Marquis of Mendigorria.

He was the son of José de Córdoba y Rojas and elder brother of Fernando Fernández de Córdova. An outspoken adversary of the Spanish Constitution of 1812, he organized a rebellion against the liberal government in July 1822, and was forced to flee to France after its failure.

He returned one year later in the footsteps of the French army under Louis-Antoine, Duke of Angoulême and participated in the restoration of the Absolute monarchy of King Ferdinand VII of Spain. As a reward, he was named Spanish ambassador in Paris, Lisbon and Berlin.

After the King's death, he returned to Spain to support his daughter Isabel against her uncle Carlos in the First Carlist War.

On December 12, 1834 he led a Division under Rodil and beat Zumalacárregui in the Battle of Mendaza. Three days later he suffered a defeat in the First Battle of Arquijas and was dismissed.

On June 24, 1835, he was recalled and became commander of the North. He confirmed his reputation three weeks later by winning an important victory against general Vicente González Moreno in the Battle of Mendigorría, earning him the title of Marquis of Mendigorria.

In August 1836, the progressives rebelled against the moderate government and Regent Maria Cristina was forced to re-introduce the Spanish Constitution of 1812. General Córdova, together with senior government officials, then went into exile, and was replaced by Baldomero Espartero as head of the Army of the North.

He attempted a failed uprising in Seville in 1838, and fled to Portugal where he died 2 years later.
