= 12th Foreign Infantry Regiment =

12th Foreign Infantry Regiment (12^{e} Régiment Étranger d'Infanterie)
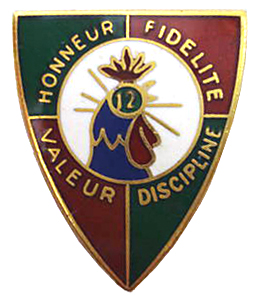
- Regimental insignia
- Active: 6 November 1939 - 1940
- Country: France
- Branch: French Army
- Type: Infantry
- Size: 3,000 men

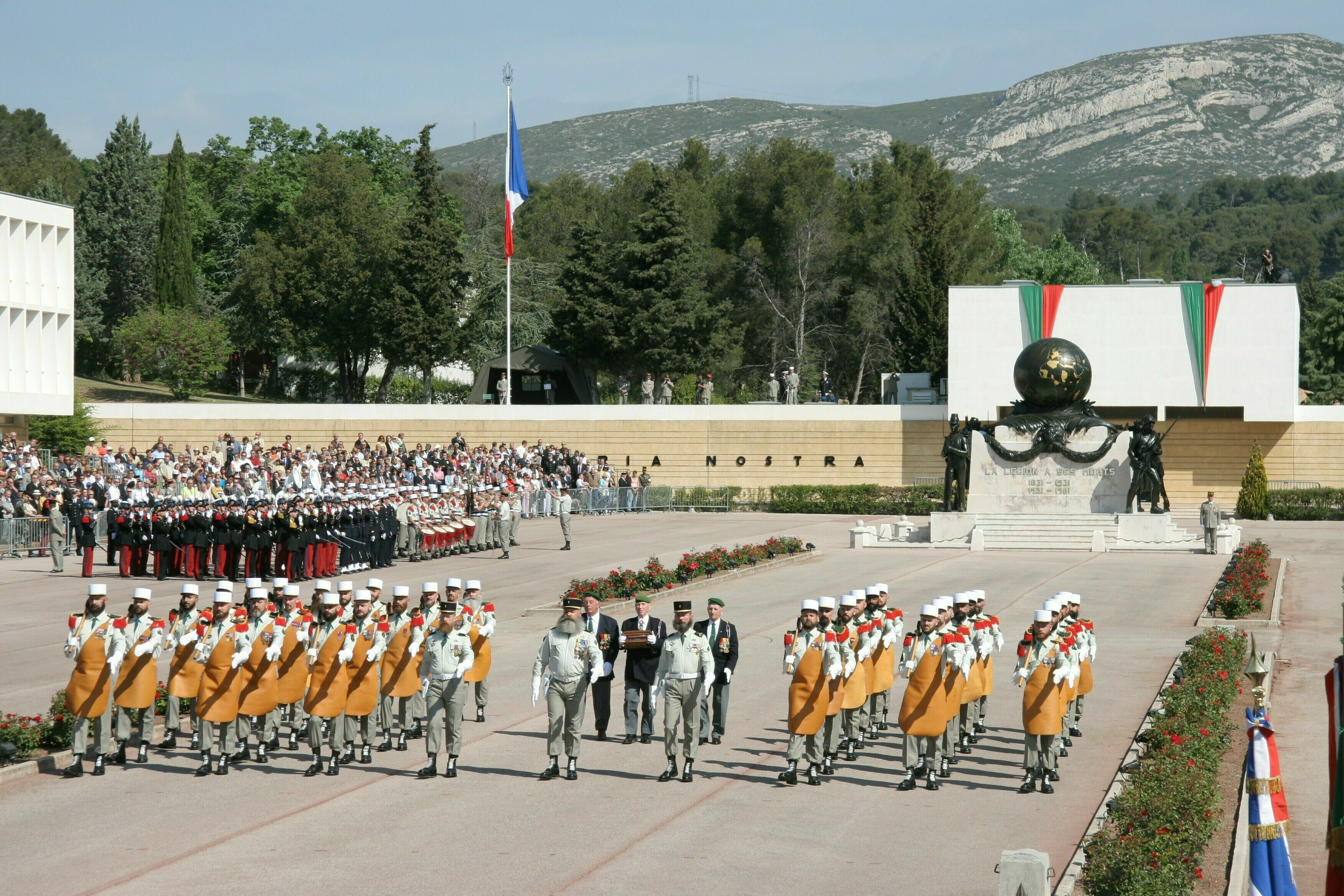
Each year, the Foreign Legion commemorates and celebrates Camarón in its headquarters in Aubagne and Bastille Day military parade in Paris; featuring the Pionniers leading and opening the way.

The 12th Foreign Infantry Regiment (French: 12^{e} Régiment étranger d'infanterie, 12^{e} REI) was an infantry regiment of the Foreign Legion in the French Army which existed from 1939 to 1940 at the beginning of World War II.

== History ==
The regiment was sent from its training camp at La Valbonne straight into action at Soissons, Picardy on 11 May 1940. After fighting its way out of encirclement it was broken as a unit by 6 June 1940. By the Armistice the remaining men, only 300 of the 2,800 men that had completed training, had reached Limoges in central France.

== See also ==
- Major (France)
- Music of the Foreign Legion (MLE)
- 11th Foreign Infantry Regiment
