= 11th Foreign Infantry Regiment =

11th Foreign Infantry Regiment (11e Régiment Étranger d'Infanterie)
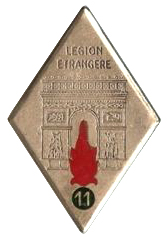
- Active: 1939-1940
- Country: France
- Allegiance: Foreign Legion
- Branch: French Army
- Type: Infantry
- Size: 3,000 men
- Engagements: World War II: Battle of France

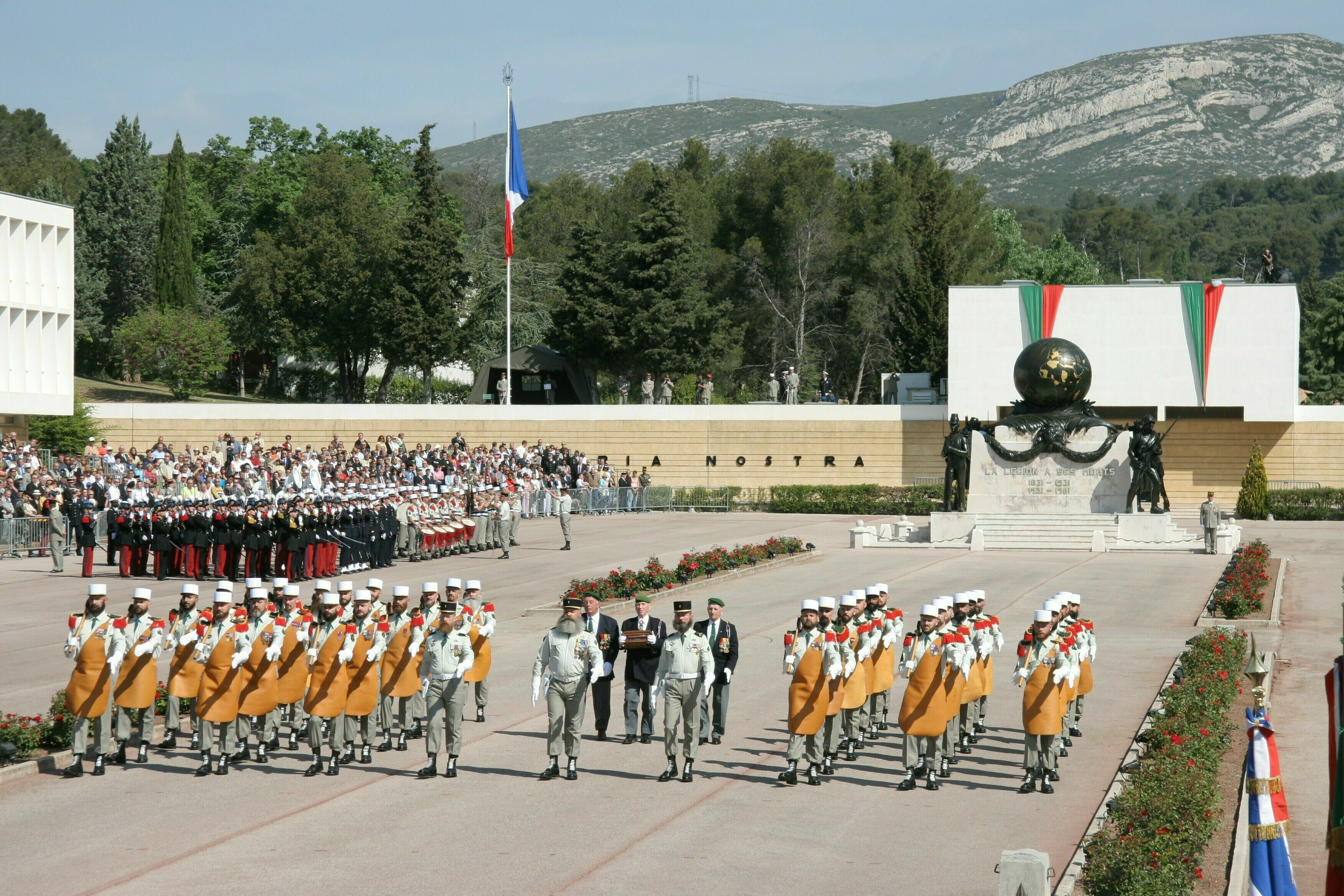
Each year, the Foreign Legion commemorates and celebrates Camarón in its headquarters in Aubagne and Bastille Day military parade in Paris; featuring the Pionniers leading and opening the way.

The 11th Foreign Infantry Regiment (French: 11^{e} Régiment Étranger d'Infanterie, 11^{e} REI) was a regiment of the Foreign Legion in the French Army which served during World War II from 1939 to 1940.

== History ==
The 11th Foreign Infantry Regiment was stationed in Lorraine, France from late 1939 to the spring of 1940.

The 11th REI defended the northern Inor Wood near Verdun from the German offensive early on in the battle until June 11, 1940, when the regiment began a fighting retreat to the south. By June 18, the 11th REI had lost three-fourths of its strength and the regiment withdrew to the south near Toul. The regimental flag was burned at Crezilles near Nancy to prevent it falling into German hands.

== Organization ==
The 11th Foreign Infantry Regiment was composed of 2,500 veterans of the Legion who had served in North Africa and 500 Legionnaire reservists.

== See also ==
- Major (France)
- Music of the Foreign Legion (MLE)
- Peter J. Ortiz
- 12th Foreign Infantry Regiment
