= Battle of Tirapegui =

Battle of the First Carlist War

Coordinates: 42°54′36″N 1°32′45″W

The Battle of Tirapegui was fought on April 26, 1836, between Liberals and Carlists in Spain during the First Carlist War. With the help of the French Foreign Legion, the Liberals were victorious.
