= Battle of Maison Carrée =

Battle of Maison Carée
Date	23 May 1832
Location	El Harrach, Algeria
Result	French defeat

Belligerents
(France) French Foreign Legion; Elements of the 1st and 3rd Battalions	El Ouiffa tribe

Commanders and leaders
Major Salomon de Musis Lieutenant Cham	

Strength
27 legionnaires 25 Chasseurs d'Afrique	

The Battle of Maison Carrèe took place between the French Foreign Legion and Algerian natives of the El Ouiffa tribe.

== Background ==
The formation of the French Foreign Legion in 1831 was intended to bolster the French Army outside Metropolitan France by recruiting non-French soldiers. The Legion saw significant desertion by its troops, which in Algeria was exacerbated by Maghrebi hospitality towards deserting legionnaires. The Maison Carrèe, a guard post which protected the eastern side of Algiers, was a dangerous posting, with significant risk of hospitalisation from illness, which exacerbated this problem significantly. The El Ouiffa tribe at the settlement of El Harrach, near the Maison Carrèe, in particular offered sanctuary to all deserters from the Legion. On April 6, 1832, two legionnaires who had been offered sanctuary if they would desert tipped off Major Salomon de Musis of the Third Battalion. General Anne Jean Marie René Savary, Duke of Rovigo intended to rectify this problem by shadowing the "deserters" and subsequently attacking El Harrach in an ambush, killing several tribesmen and two deserters. Savary demanded reparations from El Harrach for harbouring the deserters, but this galvanised the tribesmen into retaliating.

== Battle ==
On May 23, 1832, a month after the initial attack on El Harrach, a small force consisting of legionnaires from the First and Third Foreign Legion Battalions at the Maison Carrèe were attacked by Maghrebi horsemen. Intending to seek out reinforcements, battalion commander Salomon de Musis abandoned the legionnaires with their cavalry escort, which resulted in the legionnaire platoon firing a single volley and then entering a forced retreat. The legionnaires were surrounded and captured, and Swiss acting commander Lieutenant Cham became the first Legion officer to die in combat.

== Aftermath ==
The only surviving legionnaire who managed to escape claimed that captured legionnaires were forced to convert to Islam or killed. Within France, a large share of blame for the attack was laid upon the soldiers of the battalion by the French government, which damaged the new Foreign Legion's credibility.
