= Battle of Huesca =

Battle of the First Carlist War

- Part of First Carlist War
Date	24 May 1837
Location	Huesca, Spain 42.1401°N 0.4089°W
Result	Carlist Victory

Belligerents
(Spain) Spanish liberals	Carlist Rebels

Commanders and leaders
General Iribarren (France) Joseph Conrad	

The Battle of Huesca was fought during the First Carlist War on May 24, 1837, between Spanish Constitutionalists and Carlists. During the course of the battle, the French Foreign Legion, which had been attached to the Cristinist army, suffered heavy casualties resulting in its strength being halved. The result of the battle was a decisive Carlist victory.
