= Joseph Conrad (French colonel) =

French Army officer

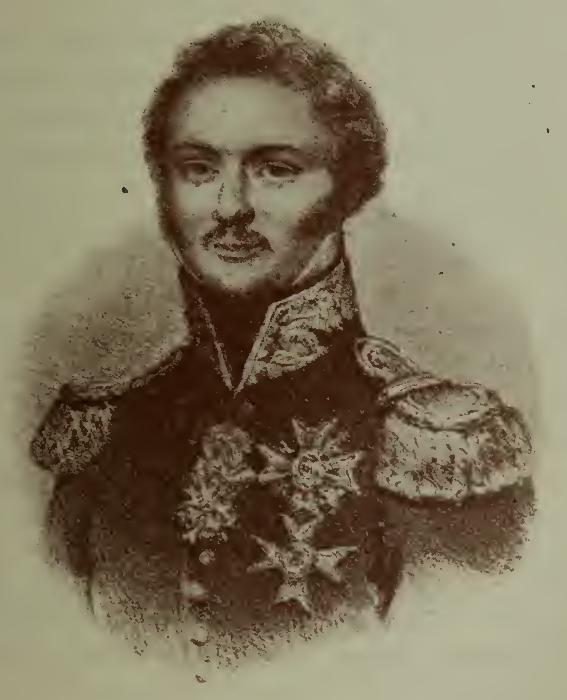
- Born: December 8, 1788; Strasbourg, Alsace, France
- Died: June 2, 1837 (aged 48); Spain
- Military career
- Allegiance: France
- Service years: 1807–1815; 1816–1832
- Rank: Colonel
- Commands: French Foreign Legion
- Conflicts: Napoleonic Wars; Battle of Essling; Battle of Fuentes de Oñoro; First Carlist War; Battle of Huesca; Battle of Barbastro
- Awards: Légion d'honneur

Joseph Conrad (December 8, 1788 – June 2, 1837) was a French Army officer who served in the Napoleonic Wars and in the French Foreign Legion serving in Algeria and Spain during the First Carlist War.

== Military Career in the Napoleonic Era ==
On April 28, 1807, at age 18 he entered the École Spéciale Impériale Militaire, the premier French military academy at the time. The next year Conrad quickly moved up the ranks being promoted to Corporal to Sergeant to Sergeant-major in rapid succession. He was commissioned as a Second Lieutenant on March 25, 1809 in the 28th Régiment Infanterie Légère, which set out for Germany shortly thereafter. He fought at the Battle of Essling where his regiment was part of the 2nd Division of the 2nd Corps under Marshall Jean Lannes. Conrad was wounded in the leg at this battle. The next year he deployed to Spain where he was wounded in action a second time at the Battle of Fuentes de Orono. He was promoted to Lieutenant in 1812. He transferred to the Grande Armée in Saxony in 1813 where received a gunshot wound in the left shoulder. He was bestowed the award of Légion d'honneur in both the Knight and Chevalier grades on October 8, 1813. Eight days later he was taken prisoner in Leizpeg. He returned to France in September 1814 and was assigned to the 13th Régiment Infanterie Légère where he served until he was dismissed following Napoleon's abdication in 1815.

== Military Career in the Bourbon Restoration ==
Conrad returned to military service in 1816 serving in both the Upper and Lower Rhine as an adjutant.
