= Regencies on behalf of Isabella II =

Minority reign of Isabella II of Spain (1833–1843)

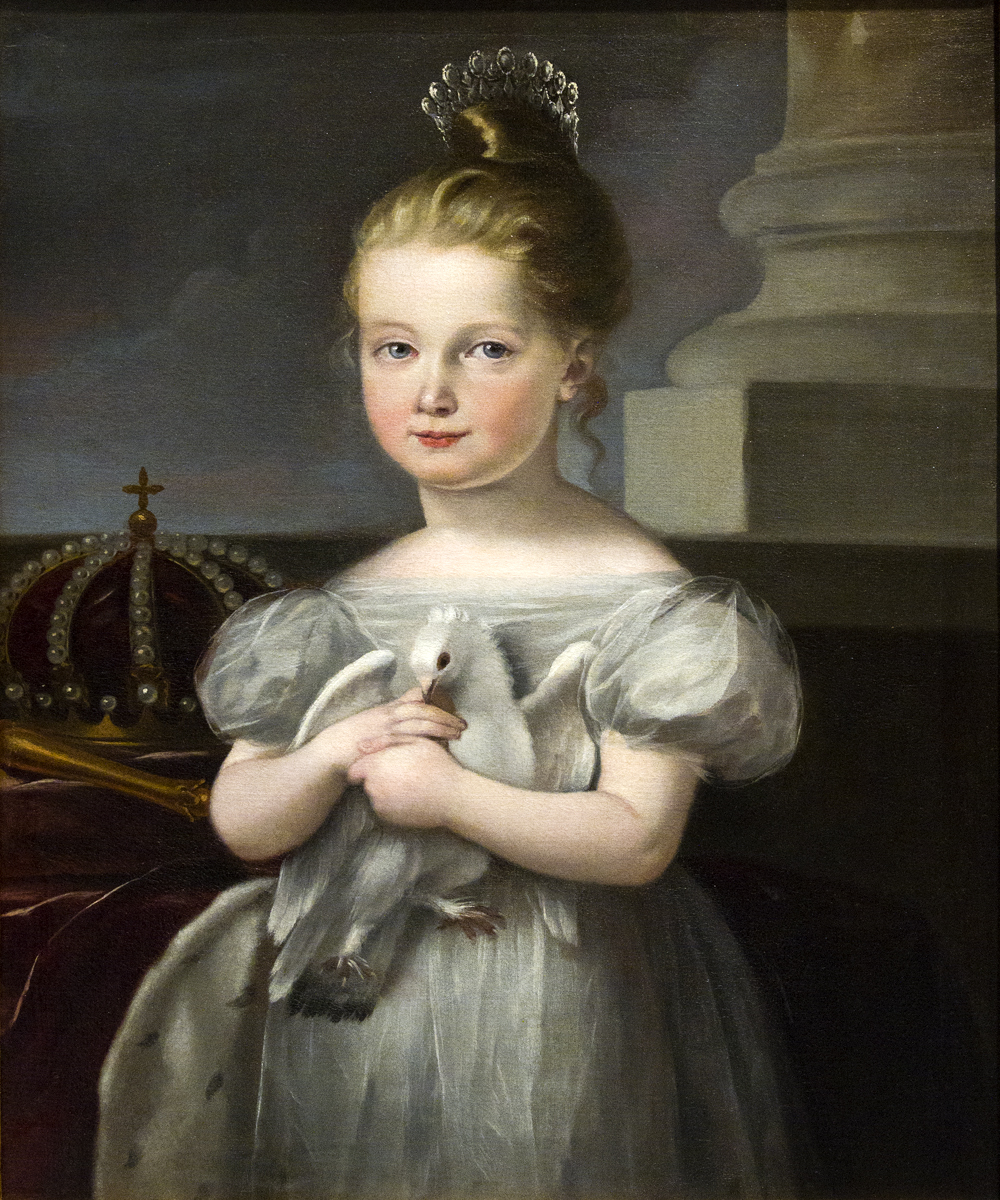
Isabella II, as a child by José de Madrazo.

Queen Isabella II of Spain (10 October 1830 – 9 April 1904) was barely three years of age when her father, King Ferdinand VII, died on 29 September 1833. The years of her minority were marked first by the regency of her mother, Maria Christina of the Two Sicilies, and then under General Baldomero Espartero, covering almost the first ten years of her reign, until 23 July 1843, when Isabella was declared to be of age.

Upon the death of Ferdinand VII, his wife Maria Christina immediately assumed the regency on behalf of their daughter, and promised the liberals a policy different from that of the deceased king. A large part of Spanish society hoped for political reforms once Isabella II came of age that would reflect the liberal models that had developed in some nations of Europe. The First Carlist War and the confrontations between the liberals of the Moderate Party and those of the Progressive Party culminated in the rise to the regency of General Espartero, in a convulsive period plagued by governmental crises and social instability.

== The situation in Europe ==
In the UK, William IV oversaw profound liberal reforms which made Parliament the real political engine of the country. After the defeat of Spain in the Battle of Trafalgar, the extension of what would soon become the British Empire began to take shape, especially from 1837 with the accession of Queen Victoria to the throne. Democracy was established in the country as an unquestioned model.

On the continent, with the dissolution of the Holy Alliance in 1830, France had overthrown absolutism with the fall of Charles X and established a constitutional monarchy in the person of Louis-Philippe d'Orleans, under whose rule the Industrial Revolution was launched and the bourgeoisie took the reins of the national economy.

Absolutism was relegated to Prussia, Russia and Austria, although in the former the impulses of unification with the German Customs Union, nourished by the liberals, who will not cease to obtain partial successes in the commercial field, will open the borders and will procure advances in the new pre-industrial society.

== The First Carlist War ==
The front line at its peak.

The death of Ferdinand VII provoked a series of uprisings and the proclamation of Don Carlos as king. The uprisings were led by absolutist military men who had been retired from the army or even prosecuted. The first to rise up was Manuel Martín González, followed by Verasategui, Santos Ladrón and Zumalacárregui. A bloody civil war began, characterized by its remote geographical locations, as it took place in the Basque Country and Navarre and in some small pockets in Catalonia, Aragon and Valencia.

=== The sides ===
Broadly speaking, the First Carlist War can be defined as the means to decide the continuity of the Ancien Régime or the triumph of liberalism.

Carlism defended absolutism. Among its ranks were the low rural nobility, the low Basque clergy and Basque and Navarrese peasants. The Carlists united under the cry of "God, Country and Fueros" (Spanish: "Dios, Patria y Fueros") (the defense of the Fueros begins in 1834 by means of an imposition of the Deputation of Biscay (Spanish: Diputación foral de Vizcaya) to Don Carlos).

The liberals were led by the Queen Regent Maria Christina. At first they were moderate liberals, but later there were also progressives. The enlightened middle classes, who had to put an end to the Ancien Régime, could be considered liberals.

=== The development of the war ===
The Carlist uprisings of 1833 are followed by the creation of juntas or local governments. When Don Carlos returned to Spain in 1834, he tried to create a government with the General State Administration in the Basque Country and Navarre that would become the national government at the end of the War. The Carlists used guerrilla warfare because of their knowledge of the rural environment and because the cities were liberal. The First Carlist War was a rural-urban confrontation that has three stages, of two years each:

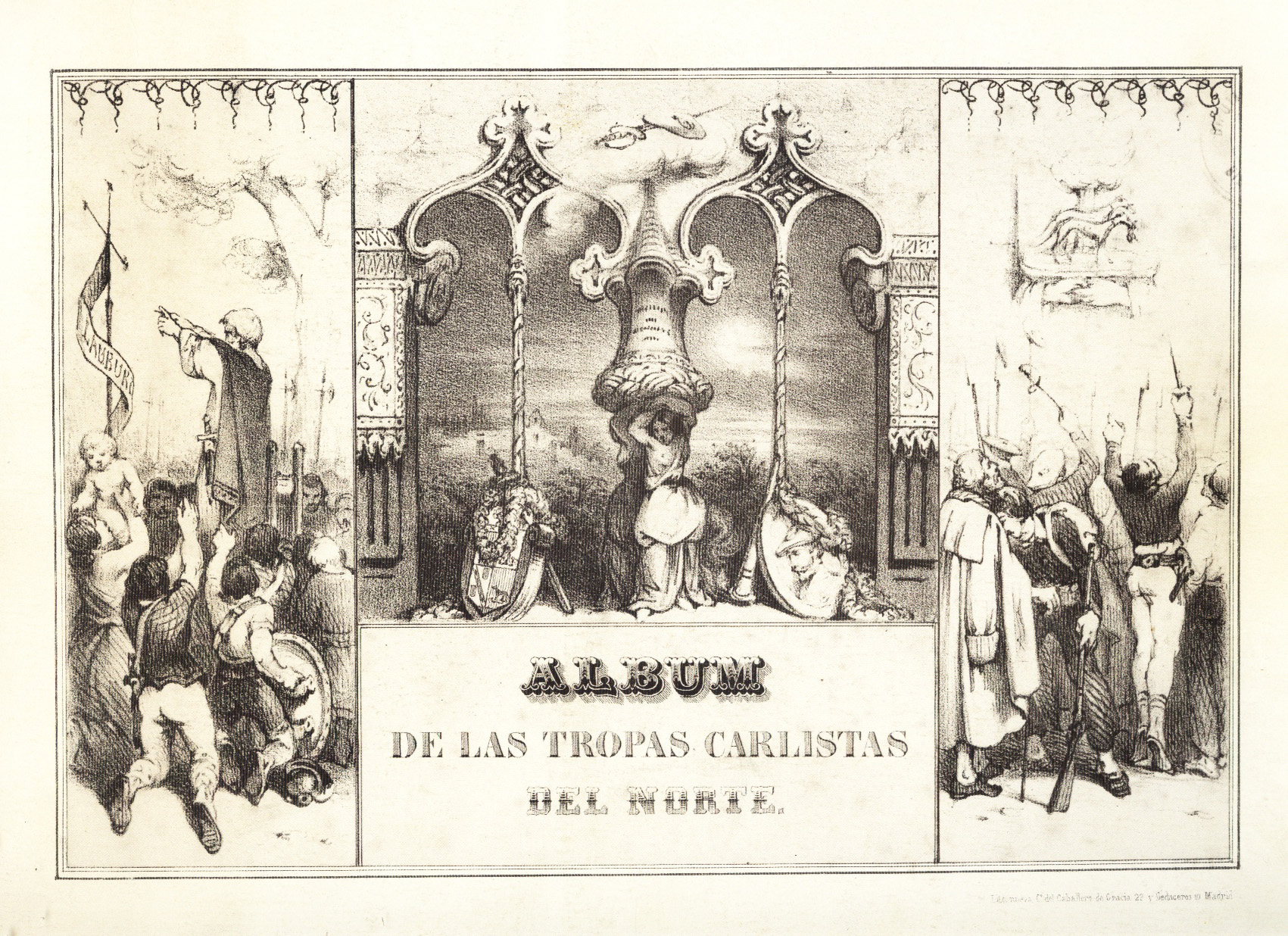
Album of the Carlist troops of the North.

- First Stage (1833–1835): dominated by Zumalacárregui, a Carlist. The liberal army was depleted by the guerrillas, which forced the Regent Maria Christina to appeal to the progressives. Don Carlos considered an assault on the city of Bilbao in 1835, but Zumalacárregui did not support this plan because he knew that the Carlist artillery would not withstand a siege. In the end the assault was a failure and Zumalacárregui died.
- Second Stage (1835–1837): Zumalacárregui was replaced by Cabrera. Luis Fernández de Córdova, a liberal, tried to create a defensive line to contain the Carlists, but this line would have had to cover more than 500 kilometres, an area too extensive. The Carlists tried to relieve the pressure in the Basque Country and Navarre with operations in Catalonia and Aragon, but they were unsuccessful and the rest of the war was only fought in the Basque Country and Navarre.
- Third Stage (1837–1839): Liberal victory. Within the Carlist side a division arose between those who opted to surrender and sign the peace; and the intransigent ones who wanted to continue fighting. In the end, General Maroto agreed with the liberals to the Convention of Vergara in August 1839, which put an end to the war, although Don Carlos would continue fighting for a few more months. Besides the peace, the agreement assures the continuity of the Fueros and allows the integration of the Carlist military into the regular royal army.

The most favoured personage was General Espartero, known after his victory in Luchana as the "Espadón de Luchana". He obtained a great political and social presence and a noble title that turned him into a Grandee of Spain, and he was Duke of la Victoria. María Christina reigned until 1843, the year in which Princess Isabella was named of age and began to reign at the age of thirteen.

== The regency of Maria Christina ==
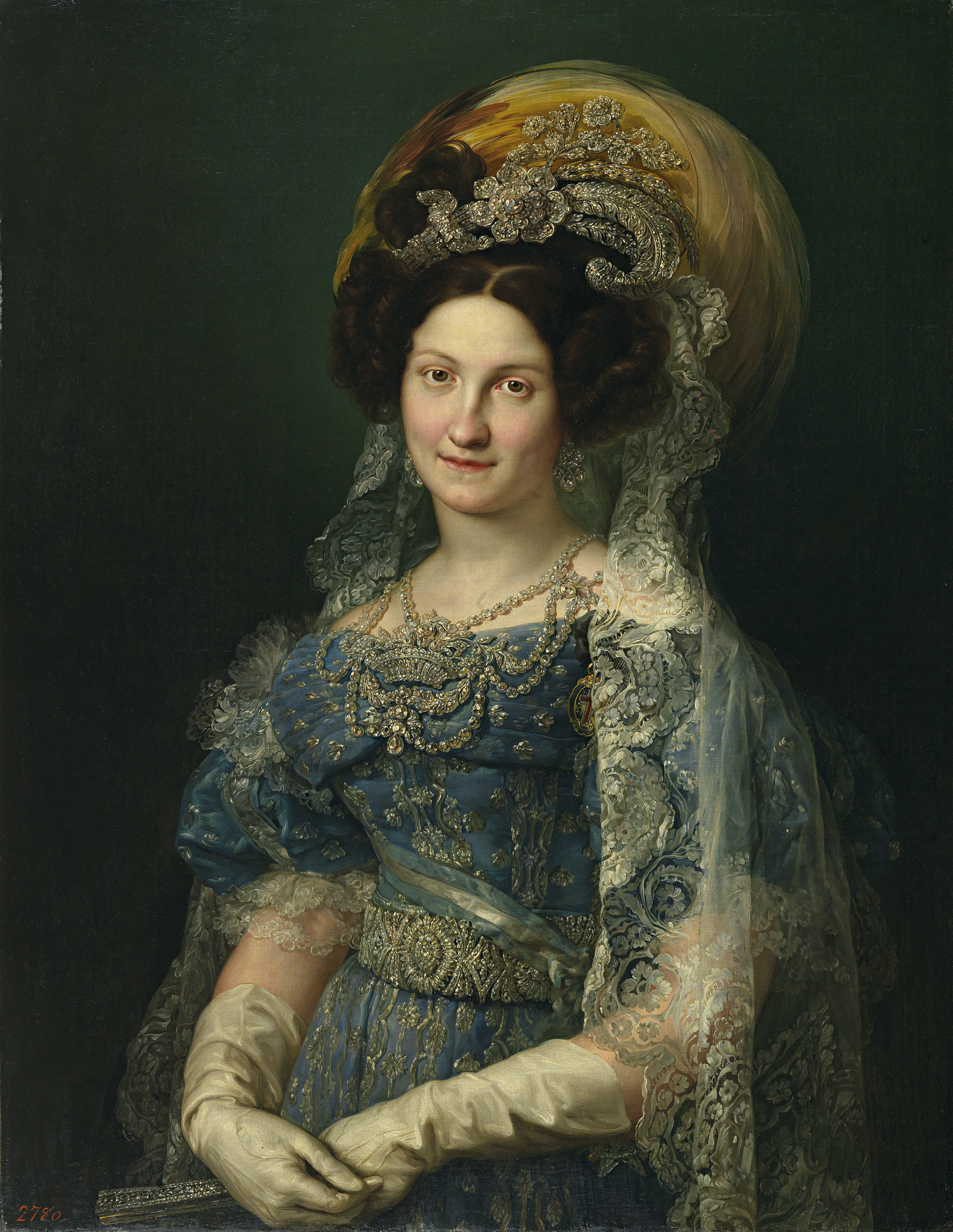
Maria Christina of the Two Sicilies portrayed by Vicente López Portaña.

=== The succession controversy ===
During the reign of Philip V, the exclusion of women in the line of succession had been established by the so-called Salic Law. This norm had been revoked in 1789 by Charles IV, by means of a decree that was never promulgated. On March 29, 1830, by means of the Pragmatic Sanction, Ferdinand VII elevated it to the rank of law. Ferdinand VII had foreseen this controversy, and, wanting the throne for his first-born daughter, the future Isabella II. He appointed his wife Maria Christina as Regent, and banished his brother Carlos for refusing to recognize his niece Isabella as heir.

Before the death of the King, the future Regent had managed to separate the military supporters of Carlos from the headquarters of the army and had guaranteed the support of the liberals in exile, as well as that of France and England. Nevertheless, Carlos proclaimed himself King of Spain on October 1, 1833, with the name of Carlos V; with the support of the Portuguese crown, then in the hands of D. Miguel I, and the complicit silence of Austria, Prussia and Russia. Spanish troops invaded Portugal in an attempt to eliminate their support to Carlism but with the mediation of England, Carlos was exiled to Great Britain, from where he would escape in 1834 to appear between Navarre and the Basque Country and lead the Carlist War.

=== The first cabinets ===
In 1832 Francisco Cea Bermúdez had been appointed President of the Council of Ministers, linked to the most right wing of the moderates, who initiated minor administrative reforms but lacked the capacity and interest to facilitate the incorporation of many former enlightened and liberal members into the new model of economic and political development. Among the reforms of the cabinet of Cea Bermúdez, a new division of Spain into provinces, promoted by the Secretary of State for Public Works, Javier de Burgos, stood out, aimed at improving the administration, which, with some adjustments, is still in place today. The lack of harmony between economic and political liberalism and the Government led the Regent to dismiss Cea Bermúdez and to the appointment of Martínez de la Rosa as the new president, in January 1834. The new president had to face the Carlist War, initiated by the supporters of the pretender in the Basque Country, Navarre, Catalonia and Aragon fundamentally.

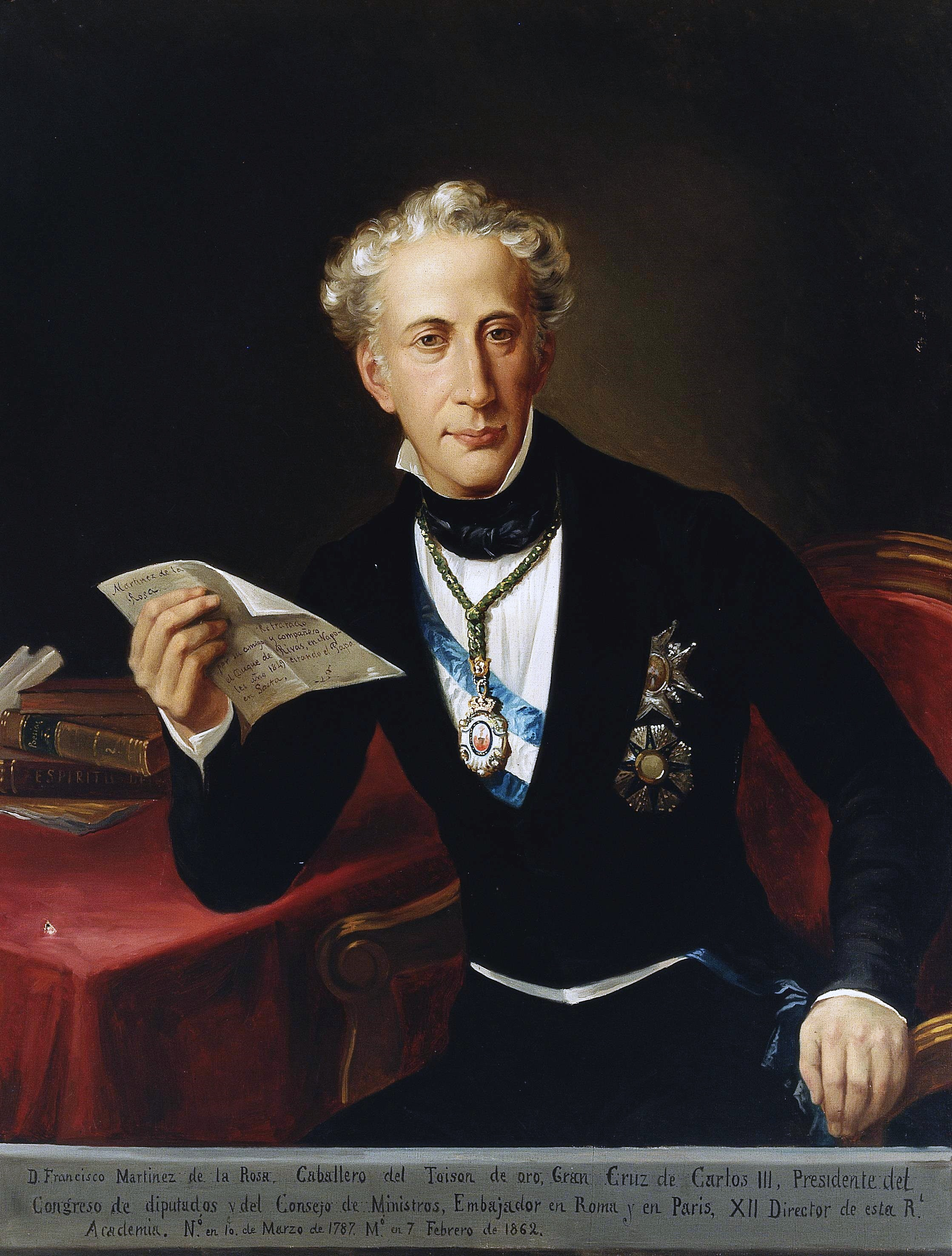
Francisco Martínez de la Rosa in a painting preserved in the Ateneo de Madrid.

Martínez de la Rosa, who had returned from exile, tried to implement a reform of the clergy and promulgated the Royal Statute in 1834. In the form of a charter, it disguised the liberal spirit so as not to upset the followers of the Ancien Régime, leaving it unclear whether national sovereignty resided in the King or in the Cortes. The political equilibrium that this indeterminacy implied ended up not satisfying either one or the other. At the same time, the climate of confrontation intensified due to the intrigues of the Regent against the liberals and a cholera epidemic that devastated Spain from south to north, generating the hoax that the Church had poisoned the wells and canals that supplied Madrid with drinking water. Assaults on convents and churches became commonplace. Harassed by both sides and unable to govern, Martínez de la Rosa resigned in June 1835.

=== The Royal Statute of 1834 ===
The Carlist War forces María Christina to transform the regime to remain on the throne. This change consists of granting powers to the liberals, with which it happens that the wife of the most absolutist Spanish king is the one who opens the way to liberalism.

In 1832, Ferdinand VII recovers from an illness and appoints a new cabinet led by Cea Bermudez, who governs until 1834 and carries out some reforms, quite conservative and directed by the king. The reforms are not well received neither by the absolutists nor by the liberals.

After the death of Fernando VII in 1833, several people close to the queen insinuated the need for a new Cortes and a new government, although later Maria Christina only appointed a new government under Francisco Martínez de la Rosa, who headed a moderate liberal government that should create a constitutional framework acceptable to the Crown. The progressives did not support Martínez de la Rosa, who was nicknamed "Rosita la pastelera" (Rosy the baker woman). Although Martínez de la Rosa may seem conservative, at the time he was a real revolution, since the monarchy renounces the monopoly of power. The Royal Statute is also a kind of compromise between monarchy and liberals to thank them for their support during the war.

In practice the Royal Statute gives the Crown a great margin of action, since it directly appoints many deputies in the Cortes and the rest are elected only by the richest. The executive power belongs to the Queen and the legislative power belongs to the Queen and the Cortes. Liberal illusions collapse when they see the few concessions that the Crown gives them.

The Royal Statute establishes two chambers. In one are the non-elected representatives, the Grandees of Spain, who enter the Cortes directly. This chamber of non-elected representatives is the Estamento de Próceres (House of Peers). The other chamber, of deputies elected under census suffrage, is the Estamento de Procuradores. They are only elected by about 16,000 men. The Royal Statute establishes that the Cortes vote taxes but does not give them the legislative initiative without the support of the Crown, which also has the executive power.

The progressives did not give up and used legal loopholes in the Royal Statute to make reforms. They were favored by the bad results of the liberals in the first years of the Carlist War, which forced María Cristina to make concessions. Among the progressive reforms are the approval of some rights of the individual (freedom, equality, property, judicial independence and ministerial responsibility). In the end, the progressives put more and more pressure on María Cristina, until in 1835 the regent appointed a progressive liberal government.

=== The momentum of the liberals and the coming to power of the progressives ===
The progressives came to power through insurrection, with revolts throughout the summer of 1835 led by the Juntas and the Militias. Given the anarchy of the country, the Queen Regent was forced to appoint a progressive government, led by Juan Álvarez Mendizábal, who quickly initiated a series of reforms that would lead Spain to become a more modern state.

The first objective of Mendizábal is to obtain money to increase the military troops of the liberals and to pay off the public debt that the State had contracted with those who had invested in the State. Mendizábal's solution is the confiscation of the goods of the regular clergy and their sale, although the privileged estates are opposed and pressure María Cristina to dismiss Mendizábal. The queen agrees and throws Mendizábal out, but there is another violent uprising in the summer of 1836 to bring back a progressive government: the Mutiny of La Granja. A new progressive government is created in which Mendizábal is only Minister of Finance.

=== Progressive Reforms (1835–1837) ===
The great protagonist is Mendizábal. In 1823, after the Liberal Triennium, he had gone into exile. During his exile in Europe he came into contact with the most liberal ideas. He has a new legal conception of property law based on the theories of Adam Smith and capitalist theories. According to Mendizábal, to make Spain a liberal country, economically and politically speaking, the following steps had to be taken: the elimination of the seigniorial regime, the dissociation of the lands (ending the majorat), and the ecclesiastical and civil confiscation. Then the agricultural revolution could be carried out, with an increase in yields that would produce a surplus to invest in industry.

The seigniorial regime is eliminated in August 1837. The lords lose jurisdiction, but retain ownership of the land if they can prove that it is theirs. The seigniories are converted into capitalist holdings. The entailed estate is also eliminated, so many nobles improve their economic situation by selling land.

The most important is the ecclesiastical confiscation, which is carried out by means of the "Law of the vote of confidence", to make decisions on the war without the need to decide them in the Cortes. The confiscation is carried out by means of a decree without debate in the Cortes. Mendizábal took the opportunity to reform the regular clergy, with two decrees.

The first, of February 1836, is the "Decree of Extinction of the Regulars", which establishes the universal elimination of the orders of the regular male clergy. Only the missionary colleges and the hospitaller orders were saved. With respect to the feminine regular clergy, the suppression of convents is decreed and, in some, a maximum community of twenty nuns is fixed. In addition the coexistence of two convents of the same order within the same population center is prohibited; and it is also prohibited to admit novices and that the brothers are priests. Those who were priests are now parish priests of the secular clergy, and the lay brothers are left in the civil society, without compensation. All the possessions of the eliminated and reformed orders become national property.

The second decree, of March 1836, is the "Decree of sale of national goods". Mendizábal argues that it solves the problem of the Treasury by saving public debt; it justifies a socioeconomic reform based on the free market, promoting individual interest; and it says that this sale of goods would create a broad group of support for the Isabellin cause.

After this decree the system of sale of national property is established. The installment sale system, which is the only possibility for the colonists to become owners, is rejected; and the public auction system is approved, in which only the richest participate. The higher the bidding, the more the public debt is released.

All this reforming action was accompanied by a series of laws that ensured the free market. To this end, freedom is given in the form of land exploitation and free circulation of agricultural and industrial goods; the rights of the Mesta are eliminated, among which are those of free passage and free grazing; permits are given for fencing off farms; freedom is given in land leases; freedom of storage and price (controlled only by supply and demand) are given.

The liberals felt strong and mobilized in protest demonstrations throughout the peninsula, which on many occasions turned into serious altercations. The press, with a markedly progressive tendency, did not spare the government from criticism and was in favor of a more democratic system, with a greater role for parliamentarism. The Regent, however, offered the Head of Government to José María Queipo de Llano, who, three months after accepting, presented his resignation because of the violent clashes that took place in Barcelona and an uprising that formed revolutionary juntas similar to those of the War of Independence period. These juntas joined the National Militia and took control of different provinces. The revolutionaries presented the Regent with a list of conditions in which they demanded an enlargement of the Militia, freedom of the press, a revision of the electoral regulations that would allow more heads of families to vote, and the convocation of the Cortes Generales.

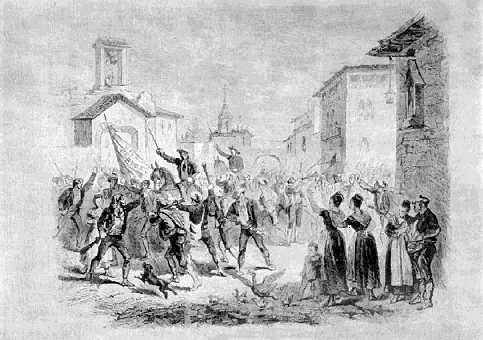
The Carlist uprising will mark the whole period of the regencies and will make difficult the task of the liberal governments. Drawing of the passage of the Infante Don Carlos through Navarre in 1833.

Maria Christina felt obliged to grant the government to Mendizábal, in an attempt to alleviate the serious crisis and to make a gesture to the progressives. Aware of the situation, the new president reached an agreement with the liberals: the revolutionary juntas were to be dissolved and integrated into the administrative organization of the State, within the provincial deputation, in exchange for the political and economic reforms that he undertook to carry out. He obtained extraordinary powers from the Cortes to carry out reforms in the system that took the form of a substantial modification of the public treasury and the tax system to guarantee a healthy State capable of meeting its obligations, meeting its loans and obtaining new credits, in addition to the confiscation of a large part of the assets of the Catholic Church, with the aim of making it possible to bring hitherto unproductive goods into commerce.

Among the measures that Mendizábal intended to carry out was a wide remodeling of the army, which included as first step a change in the high commands, very linked to the most reactionary sectors. Although the military troops were increased to 75,000 new men and a greater contribution of 20 million pesetas was destined to the Carlist War, the reorganization did not please the Regent, who because of it lost authority in the armed forces. Mendizábal was dismissed after a campaign of discredit, Francisco Javier de Istúriz was appointed President of the Council of Ministers, a progressive who had returned from exile and had evolved towards much more moderate positions and contrary to the confiscation process, positioning himself as a man of the Regent's clique. After dissolving the Cortes in search of new ones that would legitimize him and support a constitution different from the Royal Statute, even more conservative, his wishes were abruptly interrupted by the Mutiny of La Granja de San Ildefonso, which sought and obtained that the Regent reinstated the Constitution of 1812 and repealed the Statute. Istúriz resigned on August 14, 1836, barely three months after his appointment.

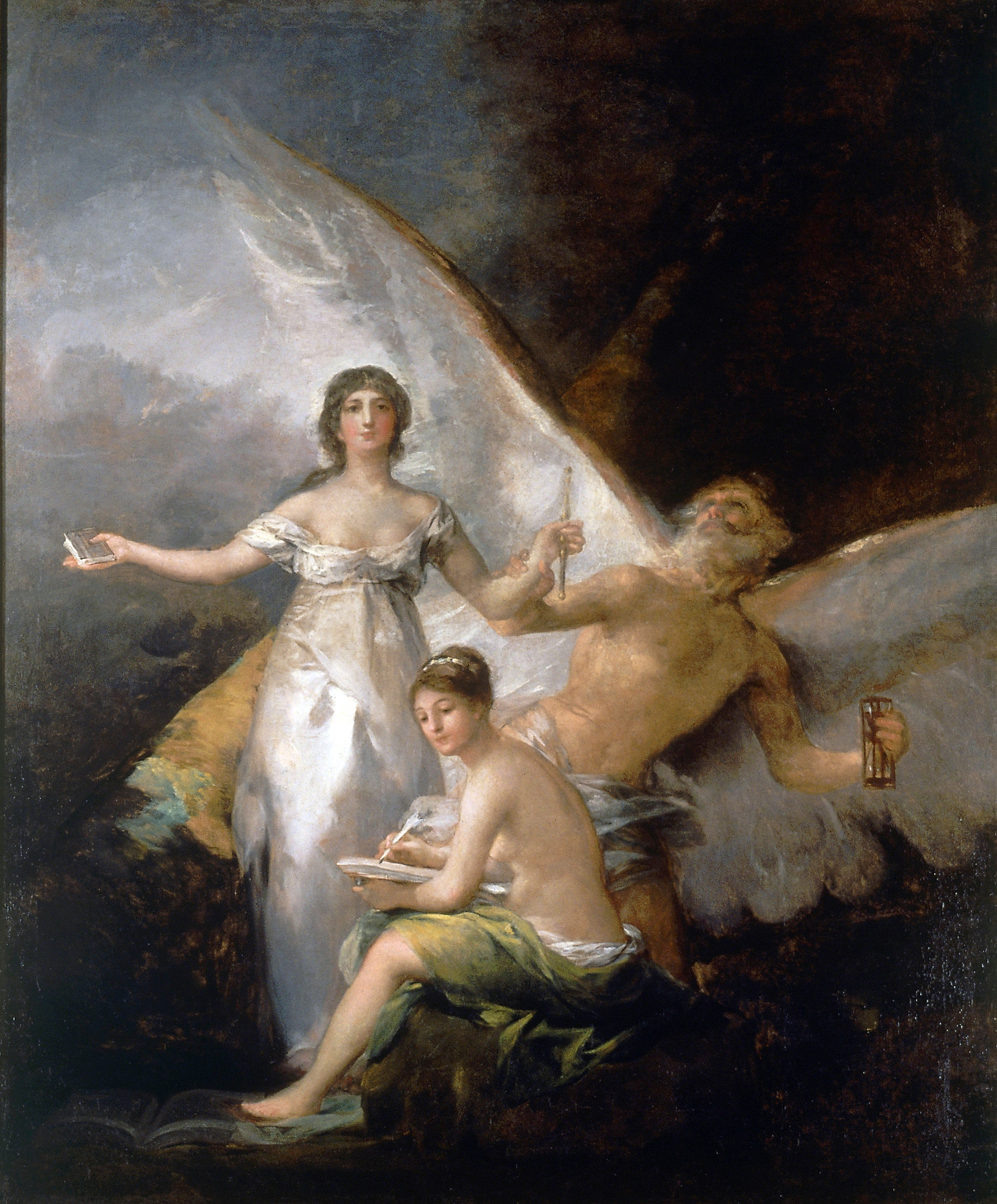
Allegory of the Spanish Constitution of 1812. Painting by Francisco de Goya y Lucientes in the Stockholm Museum.

The new President of the Government was José María Calatrava, who appointed Mendizábal as Minister of Finance, in a continuist line. He took advantage of this to conclude the confiscation process and the suppression of the tithes. Calatrava promoted a social policy that allowed him to approve the first law in Spain that regulated and recognized the freedom of the press. But the most important work was the adaptation of the Constitution of 1812 to the new reality to which the Regent had committed herself by Royal Decree during the Mutiny of La Granja, with the approval of the Constitution of 1837.

=== Constitution of 1837 ===
After the Mutiny of La Granja, the progressive government convened an extraordinary constituent Cortes, which had two options: to reform the Constitution of 1812 or to create a new one. This would give rise to the Constitution of 1837, which would lead to a new political system until 1844. In addition, the reforms it proposes give rise to a class society. The progressive party, "direct heir" of the doceañistas, proposes the reform of the Constitution of 1812, but in reality gives birth to a new Constitution that wants to be of consensus and therefore acceptable to the moderates. This moderantism is seen at the moment of deciding the form of government, because they choose a constitutional monarchy of a doctrinaire liberal character: the executive role of the Crown is reinforced. They only agree with the doceañistas in the proclamation of national sovereignty, from which the constitution arises without the Crown acting. But the affirmation of the principle of national sovereignty is not made in the articles, as was the case in the Constitution of 1812, but appears in the preamble.

The Constitution of 1837 established a bicameral Cortes: the Senate, appointed by the Queen; and the Lower house, elected by census suffrage. The Crown can dissolve the Cortes, in which it acts as moderator, and veto laws. It is the first power of the State, although its powers are limited by the Cortes, which are on a lower plane.

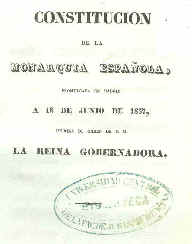
Spanish Constitution of 1837.

The reasons that lead the progressives to make this constitution have given rise to a debate in historiography. One of the most widely followed ideas is that the progressives, with all the power, break the political exclusivism between progressives and moderates, create a transactional constitution, to accommodate the Crown. This theory considers the Constitution of 1837 as the precedent of the Canovist Constitution of 1876. It is followed by Suanzes-Carpeña and Miguel de Artola.

Another idea of some historians is that exclusivism is accidental, and that the progressives did not dare to propose a system other than constitutional monarchy. They thought neither of a parliamentary monarchy nor of a republic. This second idea is defended by Javier Tusell.

Another third proposal says that basically the moderate and the progressive parties defend the same thing, they are the same, and that the only difference between them is the pace of reforms. As for the social model they defend, it is a mesocratic Spain, of capitalist owners and free market.

Apart from this debate on the Constitution of 1837, the great problem of liberalism is the economic backwardness of the country, so the middle class is very weak. Liberalism has enemies on the right, the absolutists; and on the left, the supporters of a social revolution. In the meantime, the only thing that interests the liberals is to maintain what they have achieved. Progressives and moderates knew that order could not be maintained by an insecure parliament with many alternations, so they opted to strengthen the executive power, which offered two possibilities: an authoritarian regime in the hands of a military man or to strengthen the Crown. Within the second option, the progressives contemplate a monarchy with all the powers, but they want someone they can control as king.

Although in principle it was an attempt to reform the Constitution of 1812, the Constitution of 1837 was a completely new Constitution, drawn up on the basis of a certain consensus that sought to overcome the discussion between progressives and moderates on the question of national sovereignty. The text, very short, recognized the legislative power of the Cortes —in a bicameral system with the Congress of Deputies and the Senate— together with the King, to whom corresponded the prerogatives of the Head of state and the executive power, which he later delegated to the Presidency of the Council of Ministers, but reserving great maneuvering capacity, such as the dissolution of the Chambers. The text protected freedom of the press, among other individual rights.

=== The Carlists at the gates of Madrid ===
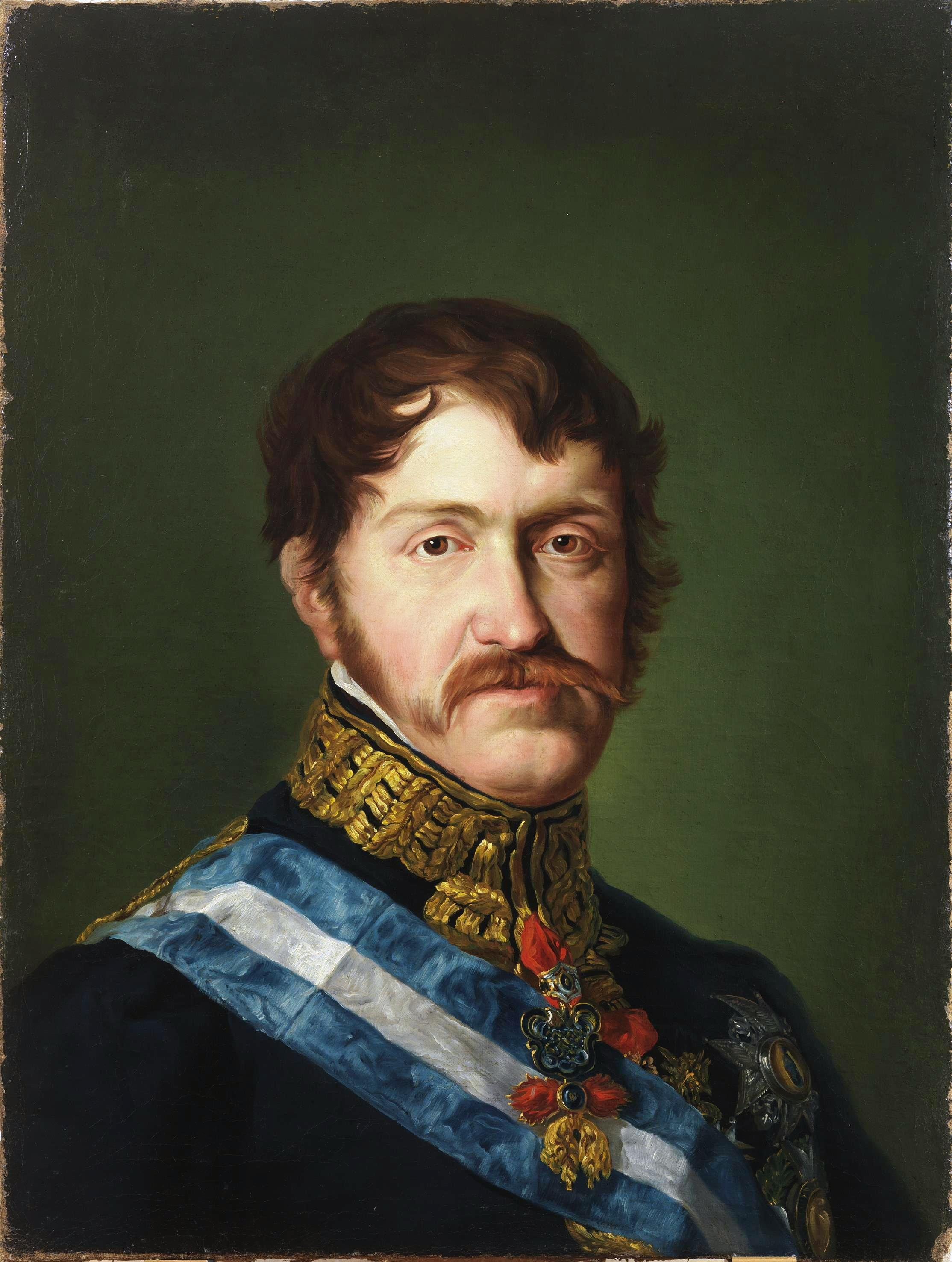
Infante Carlos María Isidro of Spain

The Constitution was drawn up while the Carlists had taken Segovia and were at the gates of Madrid. Azara resigned shortly after the Constitution was approved.

Since 1833, the Carlists had been at war against the Christinos. They had made themselves strong in the Basque Country, Navarre and Catalonia, fundamentally, with an initial support of some 70,000 men, although there were far fewer of them in arms. On November 14, 1833, the Juntas of Alava and Biscay named Tomás de Zumalacárregui head of their armies. The Christino army counted at that time about 115,000 men, although only about 50,000 were capable of fighting. In the future, about half a million men had to be mobilized to face the Carlist troops victoriously. The Infante Don Carlos, escaped from his English exile, settled between Navarre and the Basque Country, and from there he directed the conflict, establishing the capital in Estella.

After initial successes, Zumalacárregui lost the Battle of Mendaza on December 12, 1834, and retreated until a new incursion in the spring of 1835 that forced the Regent's followers to position themselves beyond the Ebro River. During the siege of Bilbao on June 15 of that year, Zumalacárregui suffered battle wounds that caused his death days later. In the summer of 1835, the Isabellinos under the command of General Fernández de Córdova tried to isolate the Carlists in the north but only managed to maintain control of the most important cities.

The death of Zumalacárregui caused a stabilization of the fronts, except for the incursion of 1837 to the gates of Madrid. General Baldomero Espartero was in charge of leading the troops loyal to the Regent and avoiding the onslaught of the Royal Expedition that approached Madrid, until August 29, 1839, when he signed peace with the Carlist general Rafael Maroto in what is known as the Abrazo de Vergara (Embrace of Vergara).

=== The contending political formations ===
The Progressive Party defended a national sovereignty that resided only in the Cortes Generales, which put them in opposition to the monarchist thesis, although their intention was not the establishment of a Republic. He organized a National Militia, much contested by the moderates who saw in it the end of the army of the notables. In economic matters, they relied on the theses of Mendizábal and Flórez Estrada, with the confiscation processes, the abolition of the majorat and the opening of trade and free trade.

In 1849, the Democratic Party was formed, which was more ambitious than the progressives and sought universal manhood suffrage as opposed to census suffrage, the legalization of the incipient workers' organizations and a fair distribution of land for farmers, since confiscation had changed hands but had not brought land to the peasants.

The moderates presented themselves as those who contained the liberals in their eagerness to destroy the monarchy and the Ancien Régime. Its members were mostly nobles, aristocrats, high officials, lawyers and members of the Court and the clergy. They claimed a concept of national sovereignty shared between the King and the Cortes with alleged "historical rights" and "ancient customs".

=== The moderate triennium (1837–1840) ===
Whether it was due to the Carlist offensive or to the very weakness of the political parties or to both phenomena, Calatrava's succession brought three men from the most moderate wing of liberalism to the Presidency of the Council of Ministers in less than a year.

The first was Eusebio Bardají Azara, who acceded after the resignation of Espartero, who preferred to continue the military campaign, and obtained even more prestige when he came down from Navarre with his men to defend the capital from the Carlist troops of General Juan Antonio de Zaratiegui, whom he defeated. Azara resigned, dissatisfied with the position of the Regent, who tried by all means to win the sympathies of Espartero's men. He was followed by Narciso de Heredia and Bernardino Fernández de Velasco. However, on December 9, 1838, Evaristo Pérez de Castro was appointed. The new president established reforms in local administration that allowed a certain level of state interventionism, and at the same time tried to reconcile the most negative aspects of the confiscation of Mendizábal with the Holy See, especially suspicious of the Spanish Crown since the death of Fernando VII.

=== The "revolution of 1840" and the end of the regency of Maria Christina ===
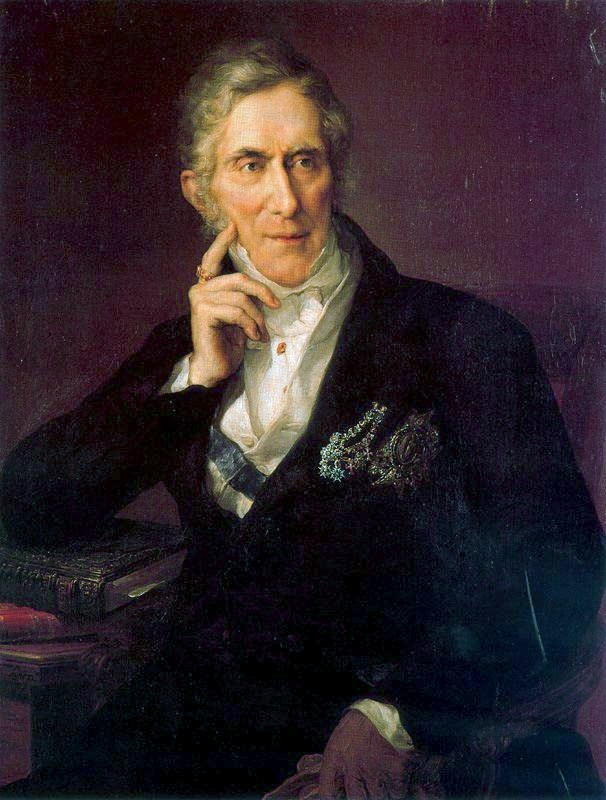
Evaristo Pérez de Castro, president of the moderate government that promoted the Local Government Law of 1840.

The idea of a peaceful alternation in power between moderates and progressives supported by the Constitution of 1837 was frustrated when the moderate government of Evaristo Pérez de Castro presented a bill for the Local Government Law in which the appointment of the mayor corresponded to the government which would choose him from among the elected councilors, which, according to the progressives, was contrary to article 70 of the Constitution ("For the government of the towns there will be Local Governments appointed by the neighbors to whom the law grants this right"), so the progressives resorted to popular pressure during the debate of the law —a riot in Madrid ended with the invasion of the tribunes of the Congress of Deputies from where they shouted and insulted the moderate deputies— and, when the law was approved without admitting their amendments, they opted for withdrawal and left the Chamber, thus questioning the legitimacy of the Cortes. Immediately, the progressives began a campaign so that the regent Maria Christina would not sanction the law under the threat of not obeying it —that is, under the threat of rebellion— and when they saw that the regent was willing to sign it, they addressed their petitions to General Baldomero Espartero, the most popular figure of the moment after his triumph in the First Carlist War and who was closer to progressivism than to moderantism, to prevent the promulgation of that law contrary to the "spirit of the Constitution of 1837".

The radical opposition of the progressives to the Local Government Law —to the point that it made them abandon the "legal way" to opt for the "revolutionary way"— was due, according to Jorge Vilches, to the importance of the figure of the mayor in the elaboration of the electoral census —the local government was the one that issued the electoral ballots— and in the organization, direction and composition of the National Militia, which made the progressives fear that their chances of gaining access to the government through elections would be practically nil, in addition to the fact that the militia, whose existence for the progressives was essential for the "vigilance of the rights of the people," would be placed in the hands of the moderates.

The Regent was aware that the system was in a serious crisis and moved to Barcelona on a supposed vacation with Isabella to alleviate the dermatological ailments of the girl and met with Espartero. This one, to accept the Presidency of the Council of Ministers, demanded that Maria Christina did not sanction the Local Government Law, so when on July 15, 1840, he signed the law, because to give back in something that already had announced publicly that it was going to do would suppose the submission to Espartero, this one presented him the resignation of all his degrees, employments, titles and decorations. The government of Pérez de Castro resigned on July 18 and was replaced on August 28, after three fleeting governments, by another moderate government presided over by Modesto Cortázar.

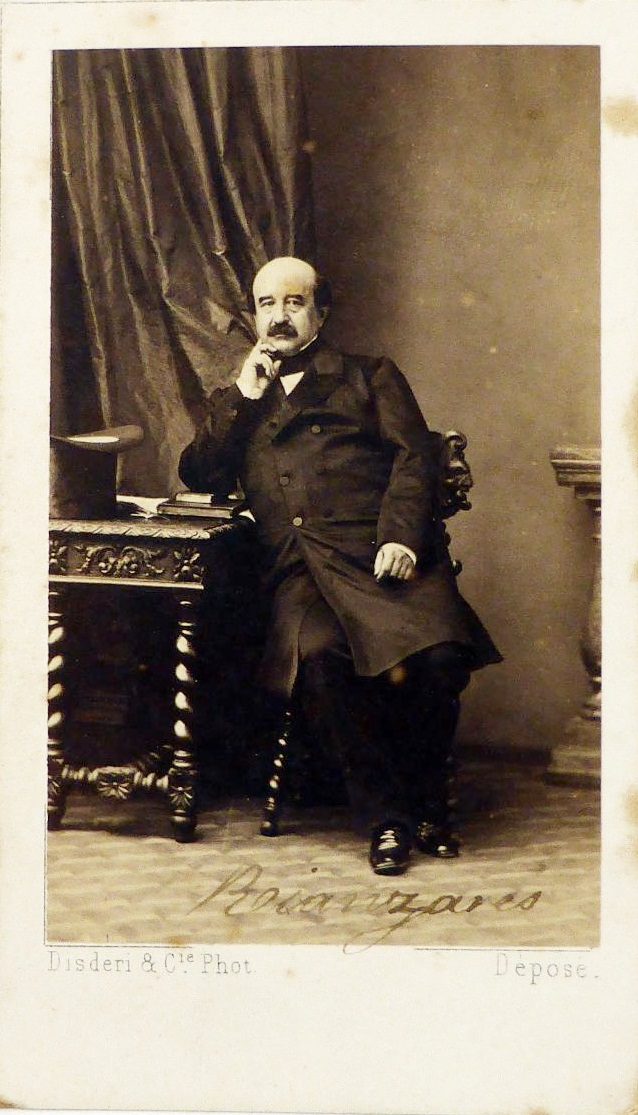
Agustín Fernando Muñoz y Sánchez, morganatic husband of the regent María Cristina de Borbón.

In Barcelona and Madrid the altercations between moderates and progressives, between supporters of the Regent and Espartero took place. In this situation Maria Christina did not consider it convenient to remain in a Barcelona governed by the progressives and where she had not found the support she had hoped for, and she moved to Valencia. Espartero tried to pretend that he was defending the Regent, so on July 22 he dictated a decree declaring a state of siege in Barcelona, which was lifted on August 26.

From September 1, 1840, onwards, progressive revolts broke out all over Spain in which "revolutionary juntas" were formed to challenge the authority of the government. The first to be formed was the one in Madrid headed by the Local Government itself, which published a manifesto justifying its rebellion as a defense of the threatened, according to them, Constitution of 1837 and in which they demanded the suspension of the enactment of the Local Government Law, the dissolution of the Cortes and the appointment of a government "composed of resolute men."

Then Maria Christina ordered General Espartero to repress the rebellion —which would also be known as the "revolution of 1840"— but he refused, so the regent had no choice but to accept the new government presided over by General Espartero and composed of progressives. The program that he presented not only contemplated the suspension of the application of the Local Government Law and the dissolution of the Cortes, but also the resignation of Maria Cristina from the Regency. In the letter sent to the regent it was said: "There is Madam, who believes that Your Majesty cannot continue governing the nation, whose confidence they say you have lost, for other causes that should be known to you through the publicity given to them", in reference to the secret marriage of Mariia Christina with Agustín Fernando Muñoz y Sánchez contracted three months after the death of her husband, King Ferdinand VII. "Maria Christina understood that she had lost all her authority and that her continuity as regent endangered her daughter's throne, so she resigned from the Regency, asking Espartero to take charge of it." It was October 12, 1840.

== The regency of Espartero ==
With the arrival of General Espartero to power after the "revolution of 1840", the government of Spain is occupied for the first time by a military man, a situation that would become frequent throughout the nineteenth and twentieth centuries.

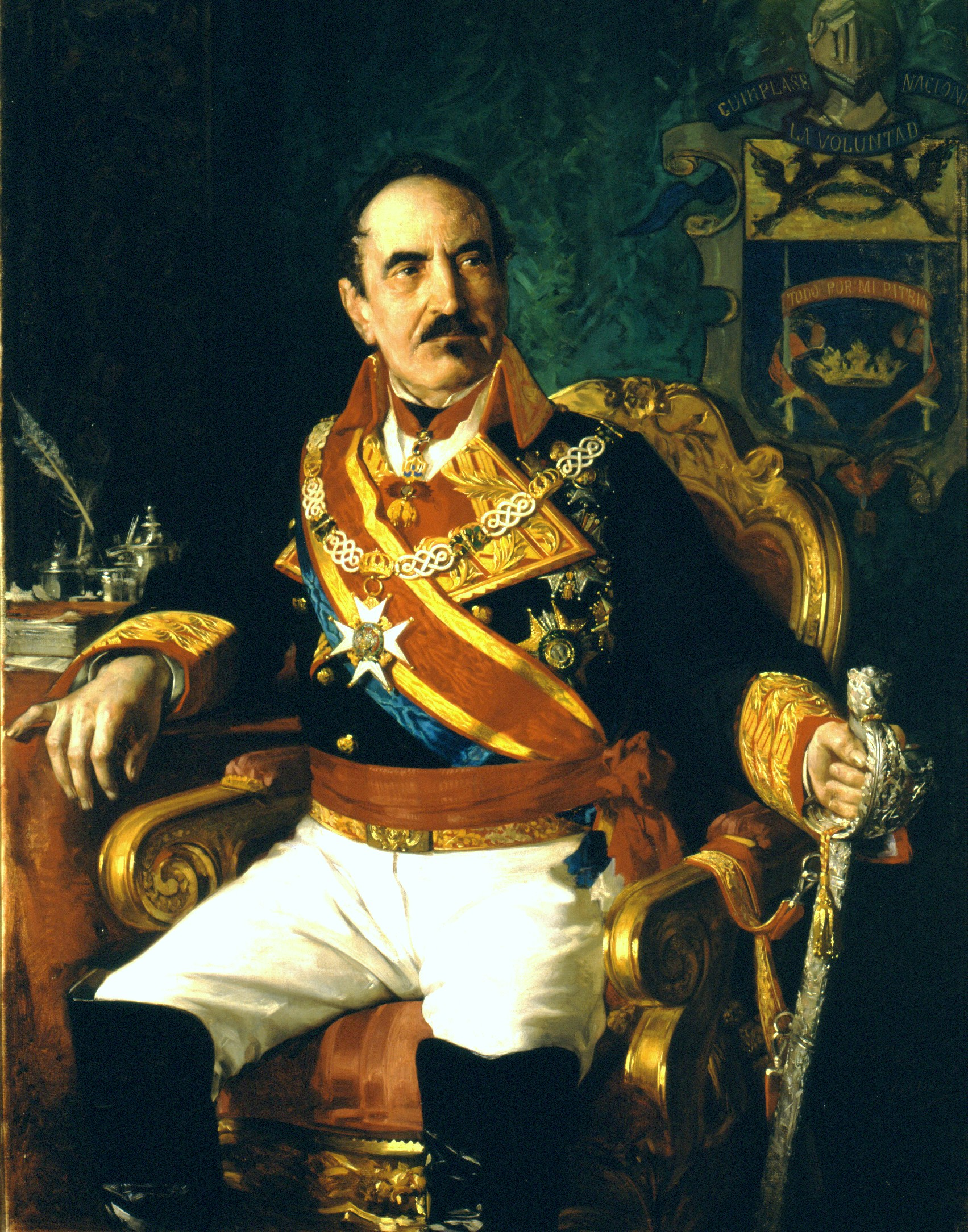
General Baldomero Espartero.

=== Formation process ===
This regency is marked by two important events: in 1840, after the First Carlist War, there is a revolutionary uprising that removes Maria Christina from the regency; and in 1843, at the age of thirteen, Princess Isabella is declared of age and begins to reign. It is a progressive period, since the Constitution of 1837 is still in force, in which there is a great dominance of the head of state, in the hands of General Espartero, born in the province of Ciudad Real in the late eighteenth century from a rather humble family (his father was a craftsman and he was the youngest of eight siblings). Faced with few prospects for the future, he entered a Dominican convent. The outbreak of the War of Independence made him leave the convent and become a soldier. At first he was part of the corps of engineers, but he left because it was very elitist and he could not be promoted. He joined the infantry corps, where social origin was not so important. At the end of the War of Independence, he joined the military expeditions that went to America to put an end to the independence movement, and there he was quickly promoted to brigadier, which is equivalent to general.

When he returns to Spain, in the midst of the Ominous Decade, he has a great reputation but no fortune. His economic situation changes when he marries an aristocrat, Jacinta Martínez Sicilia, who also places him in the highest strata of society. When the First Carlist War begins, Espartero joins the liberals. His goal is to become commander of the northern armies, a position he reaches in 1836, appointed by Mendizábal, after proving his worth at Luchana. Then he enjoys a noble title of his own: Count of Luchana. From then on, Maria Christina was under the tutelage of Espartero in matters of war, a situation that was reinforced when the Convention of Vergara was signed in 1839. This success gives her another noble title: Duke of la Victoria.

In 1840, he was put on the throne by the progressive party as the new regent until 1843. From 1854 to 1856, he was president of the government of the Progressive Biennium. In the 60's of the XIX century he is retired from politics, and after the dethronement of Isabella II at the end of the decade a sector of the liberals offers him to be king of Spain, a position he does not accept. Amadeo granted him the title of Prince of Vergara, with treatment of Royal Highness.

Within the regency, two phases can be distinguished: the formation process and the development of the regency. In the formation process, after the expulsion of Maria Christina, a discussion arose between two possible regencies. Some proposed a unitary regency and others a three-person regency. It can be said that the Unitarians are the most conservative progressives and the Trinitarians are the most radical, who want to weaken the power of the head of state. The Trinitarians are the majority in the Cortes, but the final vote is between the more conservative Congress and Senate. Espartero owes his regency to the moderate senators.

=== Development of Espartero's regency ===
Already established as regent in 1841, Espartero resumed the reforms pending since 1837. In the first place, he continued with the confiscation, which would affect the secular clergy. Within this confiscation, in addition to nationalizing Church property, he also nationalized Church taxes, such as the tithe. This meant a direct confrontation with the Church, a diplomatic rupture between Rome and Spain (the Pope was Gregory XVI) and the isolation of Espartero in Europe with respect to the more conservative powers, since he was only supported by England.

The second reform of Espartero is the Foral Question. A Decree of Law is made, called Law of administrative centralization, which entails the elimination of the fueros, which causes a conflict with the Carlists, who had signed the Peace of Vergara with the condition of maintaining the Fueros, and also provokes the beginning of a conspiracy of the moderate military, allied with the Carlists.

Espartero's reforms led to a continuous conflict between 1842 and 1843. Espartero had to face three lines of opposition:

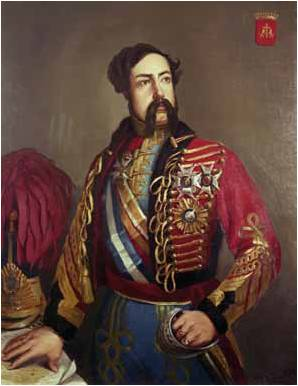
Don Diego de León y Navarrete, 1st Count of Belascoáin.

- The moderate conspiracies, with the support of Maria Christina, that originate an uprising in October 1841 that was intended to be simultaneous in the Basque Country and Madrid, where Diego de León has to reach the royal palace, kidnap Princess Isabella and take her to the Basque Country. The plan does not work, because Diego de León fails and is condemned to death, so Espartero breaks the rule of not shooting generals. The attempts of uprising of the moderates did not end, but they continued to fail until 1843. The architects were General Leopoldo O'Donnell, president of the Spanish Military Order, subsidized by Maria Christina; and General Narváez, who was the mastermind of the operations. At the end of 1841 and the beginning of 1842, there were uprisings in Barcelona, as a consequence of a free trade agreement between Spain and England that was detrimental to the Catalan textile industry. These were uprisings of a democratic and republican character that demanded a class society. These uprisings were not controlled by the government and situations of anarchy arose in Barcelona. Espartero establishes a state of siege and bombs the city in 1842. The bombardment meant a fall in Espartero's popularity.
- Espartero also found opposition in his own party, an opposition led by the civilian members of progressivism. They are very personalist groups among which the factions of Manuel Cortina, Salustiano Olózaga, and the strongest group, the pure progressives and trinitarians, headed by Joaquín María López and Fermín Caballero, stand out. This opposition undermined Espartero's popularity through criticism in the press. They accused Espartero of being an Anglophile, authoritarian and usurper of the throne, alleging that Espartero wanted to become king.

The wear and tear of these lines of opposition bore fruit in May 1842, when a motion of censure was passed that put an end to the "Esparteroist" government of Antonio González. In 1843 the regency of Espartero finally came to an end, since after the motion of censure Joaquín María López came to power, who tried to carry out a constitutional reform that would give rise to a parliamentary monarchy. Espartero did not admit this reform and Joaquín María López resigned, and in the summer of 1843 there was a military uprising against Espartero in which the progressive civilian leaders, the moderates and the Carlists joined. The great beneficiary of the uprising was General Narváez, who became Captain General of Madrid and became head of government.

The first thing the moderates do is to call elections, in which they win. The Cortes declared Princess Isabella to be of legal age at 13, and she began her personal reign.

=== Assumption of the regency ===
To come to power, Espartero relied on the "revolutionary juntas" of the "revolution of 1840", but the concrete route adopted —that the Junta of Madrid unilaterally gave Espartero the power to form the government— divided the progressives because a sector of them had asked for the formation of a Central Junta with representatives of the provincial juntas that would be the one to agree on how the government would be organized. Once Espartero's government was formed, the former advocates of the formation of a Central Board, called "centralists", defended that the Regency should be formed by three persons —for which reason they were also known as "trinitarians"— to reduce Espartero's power, as opposed to those who defended that it should be a single person, General Espartero —for which reason they were also known as "unitarians".

Thus, in reality, Espartero did not officially exercise the regency until May 8, 1841, by agreement of the Cortes, with the support of the "unitarians", the progressive faction headed by Joaquín María López. Previously, the regency had been exercised by the full Government, gathered in Council of Ministers, as determined by the Constitution. Until that date, the regency had a provisional character. The division of the progressives between "unitarians" and "trinitarians", depending on whether they preferred the regency to be in the hands of one or three persons, had a political meaning beyond mere legal formulas. The group of the "trinitarians" was made up of liberals suspicious of the authority that would be conferred on Espartero if he were granted the regency exclusively.

=== Government problems ===
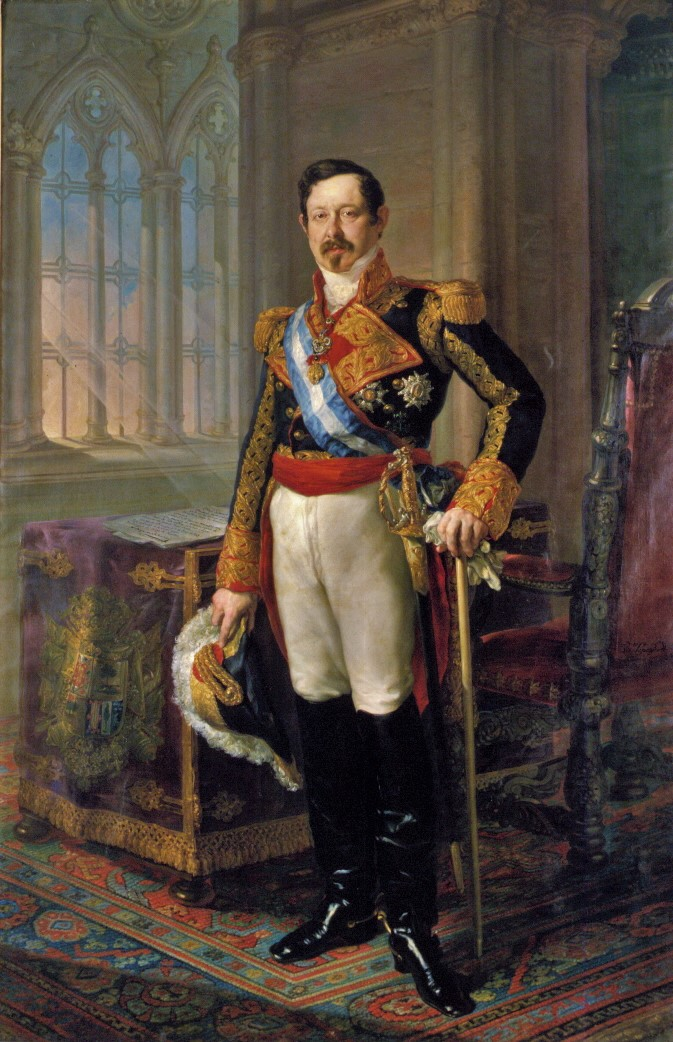
Ramón María Narváez, first Duke of Valencia. Vicente López Portaña (Museu of Belles Arts of València).

The division of the progressives was transferred to the Cortes which was constituted after the elections of February 1841, since there were represented the "radical" progressives headed by Joaquín María López and the "temperados" led by Salustiano de Olózaga and Manuel Cortina, who between them had the majority in the Congress of Deputies, as opposed to the deputies clearly linked to the regent, the "esparteristas". To counteract the possible progressive opposition in the lower house, Espartero filled the Senate with "esparterists", using the powers conferred on the Crown by the Constitution of 1837. Likewise, Espartero surrounded himself with military men more sympathetic to his own person than to the liberal cause, which led to the contestation of some sectors which saw in the general's attitude more a project of military dictatorship than of the construction of the liberal regime.

Espartero's Regency was opposed by the moderates, headed by O'Donnell and Narváez. In view of their impossibility of gaining power by means of suffrage, they opted for the expeditious way of the military takeovers, for which they counted on the help of the previous regent, Maria Christina, exiled in Paris. The takeovers took place from October 1841, when O'Donnell rose up in Pamplona and other generals in Zaragoza and the Basque Country, at the same time that civilian uprisings of a republican nature took place, most of them in the big cities.

The military coups were not considered as authentic coups d'état but as a way of extending political activity in a society outside the intrigues of power. In all cases, civilian support was received in specific areas, but there was never a purge of responsibilities on the part of the government. Nevertheless, some uprisings resulted in the execution by firing squad of their leaders, as was the case of the moderates Manuel Montes de Oca and Borso de Carminati.

From July 1842, Espartero exercised a more authoritarian power. Faced with the opposition of the Cortes, he chose to dissolve them. In Barcelona there was a civic uprising over the cotton policy in which free traders and protectionists clashed, with an assault on the citadel. The military abandoned most of the posts in the city and had to take refuge in the Castle of Montjuïc, from where the city was bombarded on December 3.

Meanwhile, throughout this period, a series of internal conspiracies reigned in the Palace over the education of the young queen, for whom Espartero had appointed new preceptors: Argüelles and the Countess of Espoz y Mina —first aya and then Camarera mayor de Palacio—, who confronted the personalities who were still in contact with the Regent, as was the case of the Marquise of Santa Cruz or Inés de Blake.

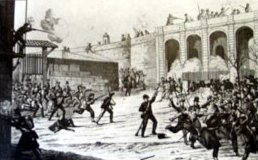
Riots against Espartero in Barcelona that provoked the bombardment of the city.

=== The end of Espartero's regency ===
After the bombardment of Barcelona in 1842, opposition to the regent grew, even within his own ranks as former comrades-in-arms and Joaquín María López himself.

After the elections of March 1843 Espartero tried to reconcile with the progressives and proposed to the leaders of the "temperate" sector Olózaga and Cortina to form a government and when they refused he proposed it to the leader of the "radical" progressives Joaquín María López. But the latter, who did not succeed in including neither Olózaga nor Cortina among his ministers, presented a government program that included the declaration of the coming of age of Isabella II —although she was only twelve years old—, which meant putting an end to the Regency of Espartero, and "national reconciliation", which included an amnesty for political crimes.

The government of Joaquín María López, which had been constituted on May 9, lasted only ten days. At the same time, the generals close to the moderates O'Donnell and Narváez had taken control of a good part of the army from their exile. In Andalusia, moderates and liberals conspired to overthrow the regime by pronouncing themselves against it. Narváez took up arms, along with others, on June 11. When both sides met in Torrejón de Ardoz on July 22, Espartero had already lost power, since the uprising had spread to Catalonia, Galicia, Valencia and Zaragoza. Espartero fled to Cadiz and embarked on the British cruiser Meteor, bound for London.

== Isabella II's coming of age and the beginning of the moderate decade ==
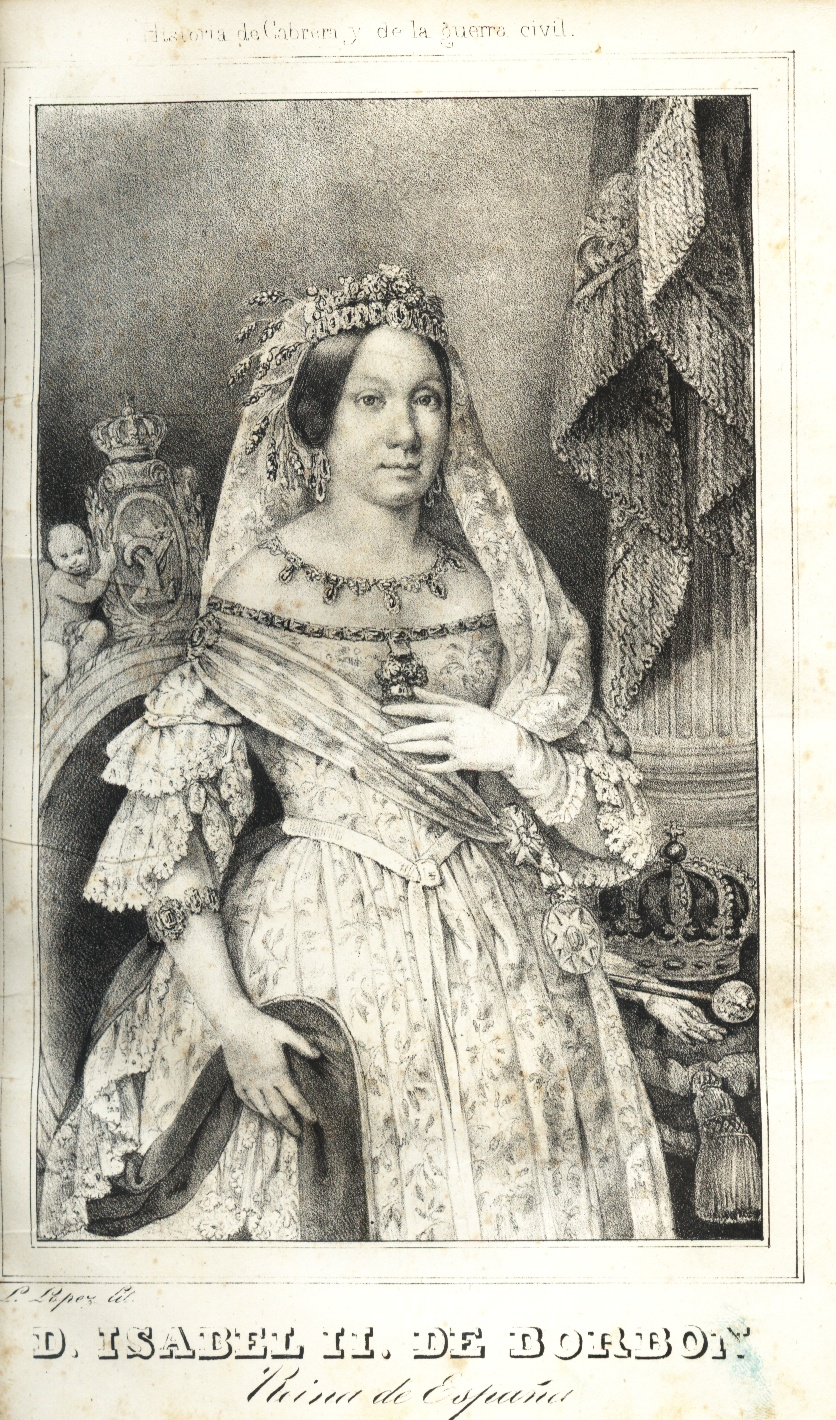
Isabella II of Spain, at the age of 15.

The exile of Espartero produced a political vacuum. Joaquín María López was reinstated by the Cortes in the position of Head of Government on July 23 and to put an end to the Senate where the "esparterists" had the majority, he dissolved it and called elections to renew it completely —which violated article 19 of the Constitution of 1837 that only allowed to do it with a third of it—. Likewise, he appointed the City Council and the Provincial Council of Madrid —which was also a violation of the Constitutiont o avoid that in an election the "Sesartaersts" could take over both institutions -—López justified it as follows: "when fighting for existence, the principle of conservation is the one that stands out above all: it is done as with the sick person who is amputated so that they may live"—.

In September 1843, elections to Cortes were held in which progressives and moderates presented themselves in coalition in what was called a "parliamentary party", but the moderates obtained more seats than the progressives, who were also still divided between "temperates" and "radicals" and therefore lacked a single leadership. The Cortes approved that Isabella II would be proclaimed of age in advance as soon as she turned 13 years of age the following month. On November 10, 1843, the Constitution was sworn in and then, following parliamentary customs, the government of José María López resigned. The task of forming a government was given to Salustiano de Olózaga, the leader of the "temperate" sector of progressivism.

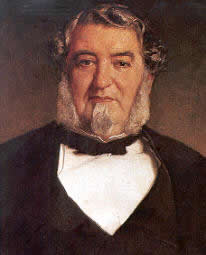
Portrait of Salustiano de Olózaga y Almandoz, oil painting by Antonio Gisbert Pérez in 1872, Congress of Deputies.

The first setback suffered by the new government was that its candidate to preside over the Congress of Deputies, the former Prime Minister Joaquín María López, was defeated by the Moderate Party candidate Pedro José Pidal, who not only received the votes of his party but also those of the "radical" sector of the progressives headed at that time by Pascual Madoz and Fermín Caballero, who were joined by the "temperate" Manuel Cortina. When the second difficulty arose, to carry out the Local Government Law, Olózaga resorted to the queen to dissolve the Cortes and call new elections that would provide him with an addicted Chamber, instead of presenting his resignation since he had lost the confidence of the Cortes. It was then when the "Olózaga incident" took place, which shook political life, since the president of the government was accused by the moderates of having forced the queen to sign the decrees of dissolution and convocation of the Cortes. Olózaga, despite proclaiming his innocence, had no choice but to resign and the new president was the moderate Luis González Bravo, who called elections for January 1844 with the agreement of the progressives, despite the fact that the government had just come to power in early December and had reinstated the 1840 Local Government Law – which had given rise to the progressive "revolution of 1840" that ended with the regency of Maria Christina and the assumption of the regency by General Espartero.

The elections of January 1844 were won by the moderates, which provoked progressive uprisings in several provinces in February and March denouncing the influence of the government in them. Thus the progressive leaders Cortina, Madoz and Caballero were imprisoned for six months —Olózaga was not arrested because he was in Lisbon, and Joaquín María López remained in hiding until his companions were released from prison—. In May, General Narváez assumed the presidency of the government, inaugurating the so-called Moderate Decade (1844–1854), ten years in which the Moderate Party held exclusive power thanks to the support of the Crown, without the progressives having the slightest chance of gaining access to the government.

== See also ==
- Baldomero Espartero
- Isabella II of Spain
- Maria Christina of the Two Sicilies
- Reign of Isabella II of Spain
- First Carlist War
- Infante Carlos María Isidro of Spain

== Bibliography ==
- ALONSO BAQUER, M.: El modelo español de pronunciamiento (in Spanish). Madrid, 1983.
- CARR, Raymond: Historia de España (in Spanish). Ed. Carr y Península. Barcelona, 2001.
- CHRISTIANSEN, E.: Los orígenes del poder militar en España. 1808–1854 (in Spanish). Madrid, Ed. Aguilar, 1974.
- FERNÁNDEZ SEBASTIÁN, J.: Diccionario político y social del siglo XIX español (in Spanish). Madrid, 2002.
- FONTANA, Josep: La revolución liberal. Política y Hacienda en 1833–1845 (in Spanish). Madrid, 1977.
- TOMÁS VILLARROYA, J.: El sistema político del Estatuto Real (in Spanish). Madrid, 1968.
- TOMÁS Y VALIENTE, Francisco: El marco político de la desamortización en España (in Spanish) Barcelona, 1971.
- Vilches, Jorge (2001). Progreso y Libertad. El Partido Progresista en la Revolución Liberal Española (in Spanish). Madrid: Alianza Editorial. ISBN 84-206-6768-4.

Preceded by Ferdinand VII of Spain	Minority reign of Isabella II of Spain; 29 September 1833 – 23 July 1843	Succeeded by Isabella II of Spain
