= Monument to General Espartero (Madrid) =

Monument

Espartero
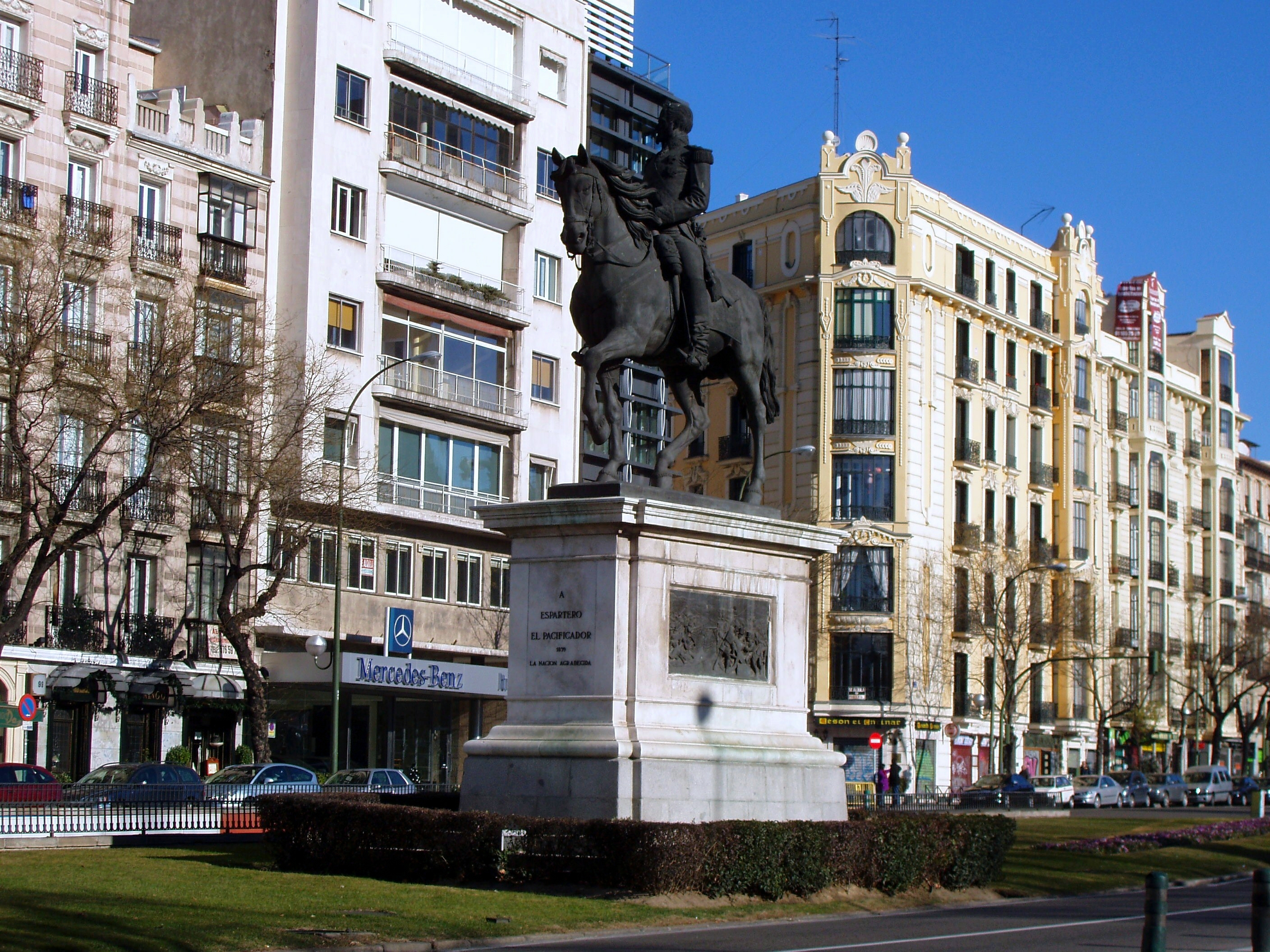
- 40.421127°N 3.683584°W
- Location: Calle de Alcalá, Madrid, Spain
- Designer: Pablo Gibert
- Material: Bronze, marble
- Height: 10 m
- Weight: 11.5 tonnes (bronze statue)
- Opening date: 5 August 1886
- Dedicated to: Baldomero Espartero

Espartero, or the monument to General Espartero (Spanish: Monumento al General Espartero), is an instance of public art in Madrid, Spain. A work by Pablo Gibert, it is dedicated to General Baldomero Espartero, "the Peacemaker".

== History and description ==
Commissioned during the Restoration period in the context of the need to define the national unity under the light of Liberal Bourgeois lines (in clash with reactionary Carlist forces), the monument to General Baldomero Espartero—one of the champions in the struggle against Carlism—came to embody a symbol of "peacemaking".

The execution of the public contest was awarded to the Gibert's preliminary project titled Gloria al Pacificador ("Glory to the Peacemaker") in 1884. Works started in 1885, and the bronze statue—Espartero triumphantly entering the city while riding his horse and greeting with a hand that holds a bicorne—was cast at J. Comas y Hermanos' foundry in Barcelona.

Standing 5 metre high, the statue was put over a 5 metre high pedestal made of white marble from Novelda. The basement of the bronze statue, that has a weight of 11.5 tonnes, reads "J. Comas y Hermanos. Fundids y Constrs.Barcelona" and "Pablo Gibert. Escultor. Madrid año 1885".

The pedestal features two lateral reliefs, also by Gibert, respectively depicting the Battle of the Bridge of Luchana and the Embrace of Vergara, while the front side reads A Espartero el pacificador. 1839. La Nación agradecida ("to Espartero the Peacemaker. 1839. The grateful nation").

It was unveiled on 5 August 1886.

== In popular culture ==
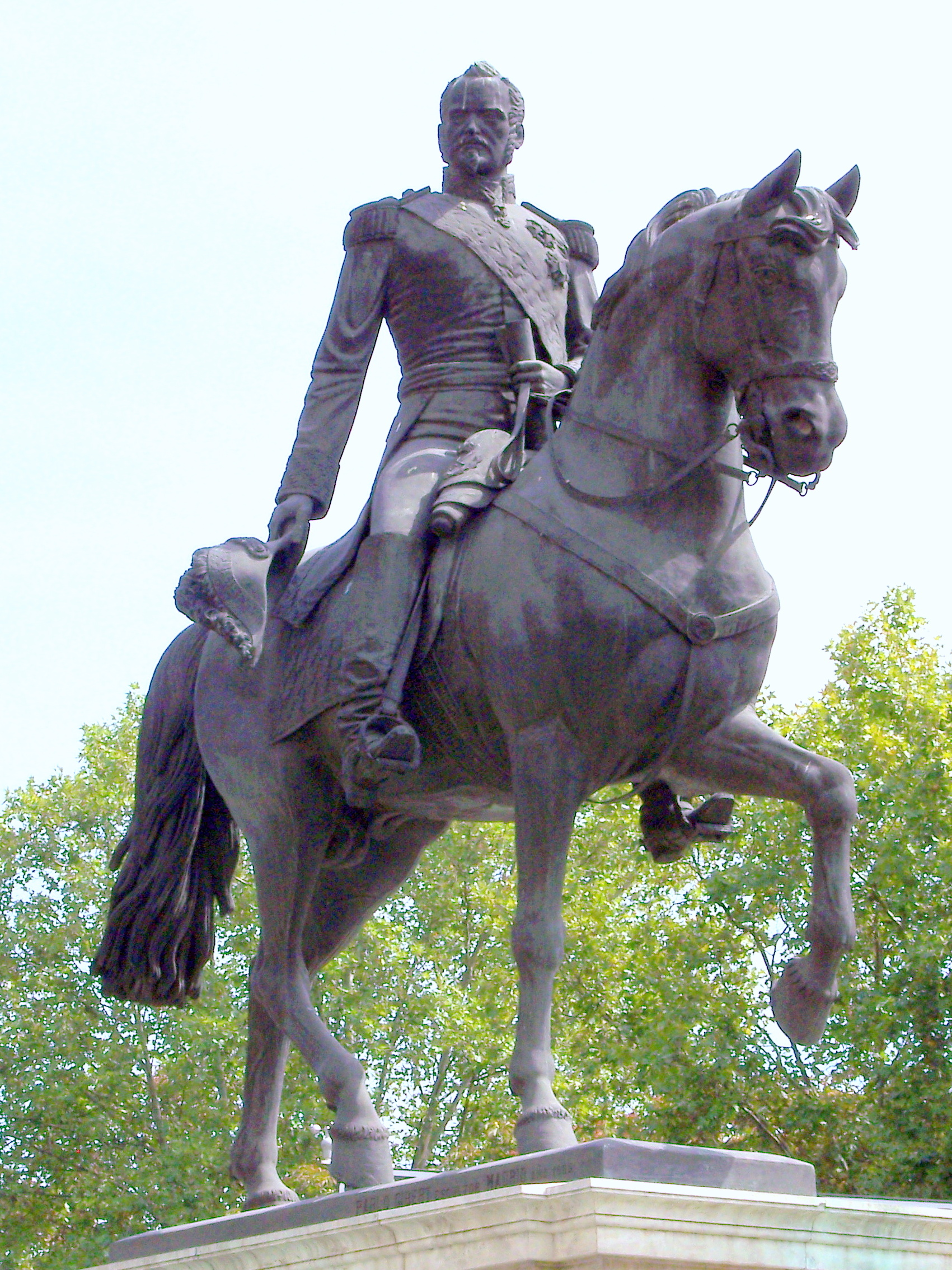
Closer look of the statue

The monument has a near-replica in Logroño, with only a few variations (the position of the right hand and the bicorne, this time on the general's head).

The horse's testicular attributes, just like those of its replica in Logroño, are linked to the origin of Spanish-language popular aphorisms such as "tiene los cojones como el caballo de Espartero", "tienes más huevos que el caballo de Espartero" or "le ha echado más huevos que el caballo de Espartero", comparing the "balls" of someone to those of the horse, used when it comes to point out the courage or bravery of that person in some difficult situation.

Pop band Mecano recorded a song about the statue in 1988, yet it was not eventually released in any album.
