= Baldomero Espartero =

Spanish general and statesman (1793–1879)

His Highness Baldomero Espartero Prince of Vergara 1st Duke of la Victoria Duke of Morella 1st Count of Luchana 1st Viscount of Banderas
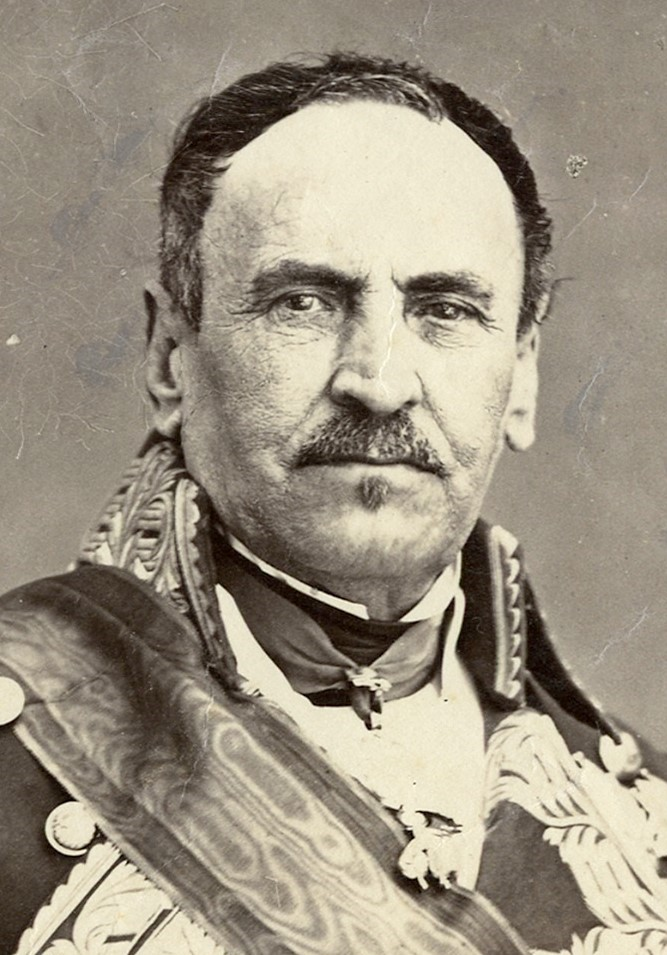
- Espartero in 1865

Regent of Spain
- In office 17 October 1840 – 23 July 1843
- Monarch: Isabella II
- Preceded by: Maria Christina

Prime Minister of Spain
- In office 18 August 1837 – 18 October 1837
- Monarch: Isabella II
- Regent: Maria Christina of the Two Sicilies
- Preceded by: José María Calatrava
- Succeeded by: Eusebio Bardají
- In office 16 September 1840 – 10 May 1841
- Monarch: Isabella II
- Regent: Maria Christina of the Two Sicilies; Himself
- Preceded by: Vicente Sancho
- Succeeded by: Joaquín María Ferrer
- In office 18 July 1854 – 14 July 1856
- Monarch: Isabella II
- Preceded by: Ángel Saavedra
- Succeeded by: Leopoldo O'Donnell

President of the Congress of Deputies
- In office 28 November 1854 – 4 December 1854
- Monarch: Isabella II
- Preceded by: Evaristo Fernández de San Miguel
- Succeeded by: Pascual Madoz

Minister of War of Spain
- In office 29 July 1837 – 30 August 1837
- Monarch: Isabella II
- Regent: Maria Christina of the Two Sicilies
- Prime Minister: José María Calatrava
- Preceded by: Ildefonso Díez de Rivera
- Succeeded by: Evaristo Fernández de San Miguel
- In office 16 December 1837 – 17 January 1838
- Monarch: Isabella II
- Regent: Maria Christina of the Two Sicilies
- Prime Minister: Count of Ofalia
- Preceded by: Jacobo María Espinosa
- Succeeded by: José Carratalá

Viceroy of Navarre
- In office 25 September 1839 – 7 January 1840
- Monarch: Isabella II
- Regent: Maria Christina of the Two Sicilies
- Prime Minister: Evaristo Pérez de Castro
- Preceded by: Diego de León
- Succeeded by: Felipe Rivero y Lemoine

Personal details
- Born: Joaquín Baldomero Fernández-Espartero y Álvarez de Toro; 27 February 1793 Granátula de Calatrava, Spain
- Died: 8 January 1879 (aged 85) Logroño, Spain
- Resting place: Co-Cathedral of Logroño
- Party: Progressive Party
- Other political affiliations: Progressive Party
- Spouse: María Jacinta Martínez de Sicilia (m. 1827; died 1878)
- Parent(s): Manuel Antonio Fernández-Espartero y Cañadas (father); Josefa Vicenta Álvarez de Toro y Molina (mother)
- Awards: Orden del Toisón de Oro; Order of Isabella the Catholic
- Nickname(s): The Peacemaker; Sword of Luchana

Military service
- Allegiance: (Restoration (Spain)) Spain
- Branch/service: Spanish Army
- Years of service: 1809–1858
- Rank: Captain general of the Army
- Battles/wars: Dos de Mayo Uprising War of Spanish Independence: Battle of Ocaña; Peruvian War of Independence First Carlist War: First siege of Bilbao; Battle of Mendigorría; Second siege of Bilbao; Battle of Luchana; Battle of Aranzueque; Battle of Ramales; Bombardment of Barcelona (1842) Spanish Revolution of 1854

Baldomero Fernández-Espartero y Álvarez de Toro (27 February 1793 – 8 January 1879) was a Spanish captain general and statesman. He served as the Regent of the Realm, three times as Prime Minister and briefly as President of the Congress of Deputies. Throughout his life, he was endowed with a long list of titles such as Prince of Vergara, Duke of la Victoria, Count of Luchana, Viscount of Banderas and was also styled as "the Peacemaker".

A "self-made man", Espartero was an exceptional case of social mobility. With a humble origin, son of a cart-maker from a small village, he was originally destined to the priesthood yet he finally opted for a military career, taking part in the Peninsular War. He would become a champion for the Liberals after taking credit for the victory in the First Carlist War and replaced Maria Christina as regent of Spain in 1840.

Associated with the Progressive Party, he was one of the so-called espadones ('big swords'), general-politicians who dominated much of the political life of the country during the reign of Isabella II. He was ousted from the regency in 1843, temporarily distancing from politics. He was called to government after the 1854 revolution, opening the two-year period known as the Bienio Progresista.

Despite retiring from political life after his exit from government in 1856, Espartero maintained a cult following largely nurtured by the popular classes throughout the 1860s and, following the 1868 Glorious Revolution and subsequent overthrow of Isabella II, he emerged as popular candidate to become the head of state of the country, either as president of a republic or as king.

== Early life ==
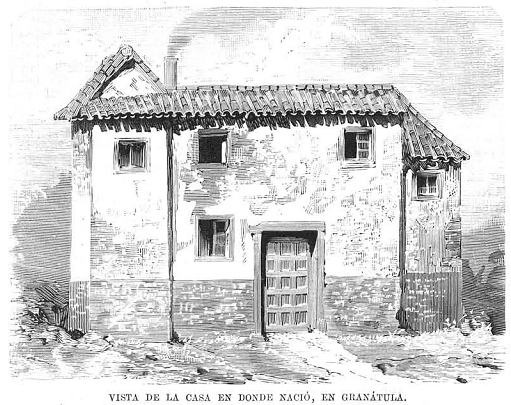
Engraving illustrating the house where Espartero was born

Espartero was born at Granátula de Calatrava, a village of the province of Ciudad Real. He was the ninth child of Manuel Antonio Fernández-Espartero y Cañadas, a master carpenter, who wanted him to become a priest, and wife Josefa Vicenta Álvarez de Toro y Molina.

In November 1809, age 16, Espartero enlisted in the Regiment of Infantry "Ciudad Rodrigo" in Seville, seat of the Central Supreme Junta. Barely 9 days after his enlisting, he took part in the Battle of Ocaña, in which the French Imperial Army defeated the Spanish. He joined the Military Academy of the Island of León in September 1810, and he was poised to join the Corps of Engineers thanks to his skills in mathematics, technical drawing, fortification and military tactics, but following a failed examination, he was returned to the infantry in 1813.

During 1815 he went to South America as a captain serving with General Pablo Morillo, who had been made commander-in-chief to quell the rebellions of the colonies on the Spanish Main. For eight years, Espartero distinguished himself in the struggle against the colonists. He was wounded several times and was made major and colonel on the battlefields of Cochabamba and Sopahuy.

Espartero returned to Spain, and, like most of his companions in arms, was socially discredited for some time. He was sent to the garrison town of Logroño, where, on 13 September 1827 he married María Jacinta Martínez de Sicilia y Santa Cruz, an orphan since 16 raised by her maternal grandfather, the most important landowner in Logroño. The marriage did not have issue, but they went on to adopt Espartero's niece, Eladia, who was designated as their principal heir. Thenceforth, Logroño became the home of the most prominent of the Spanish political generals of the 19th century.

== Carlist War ==
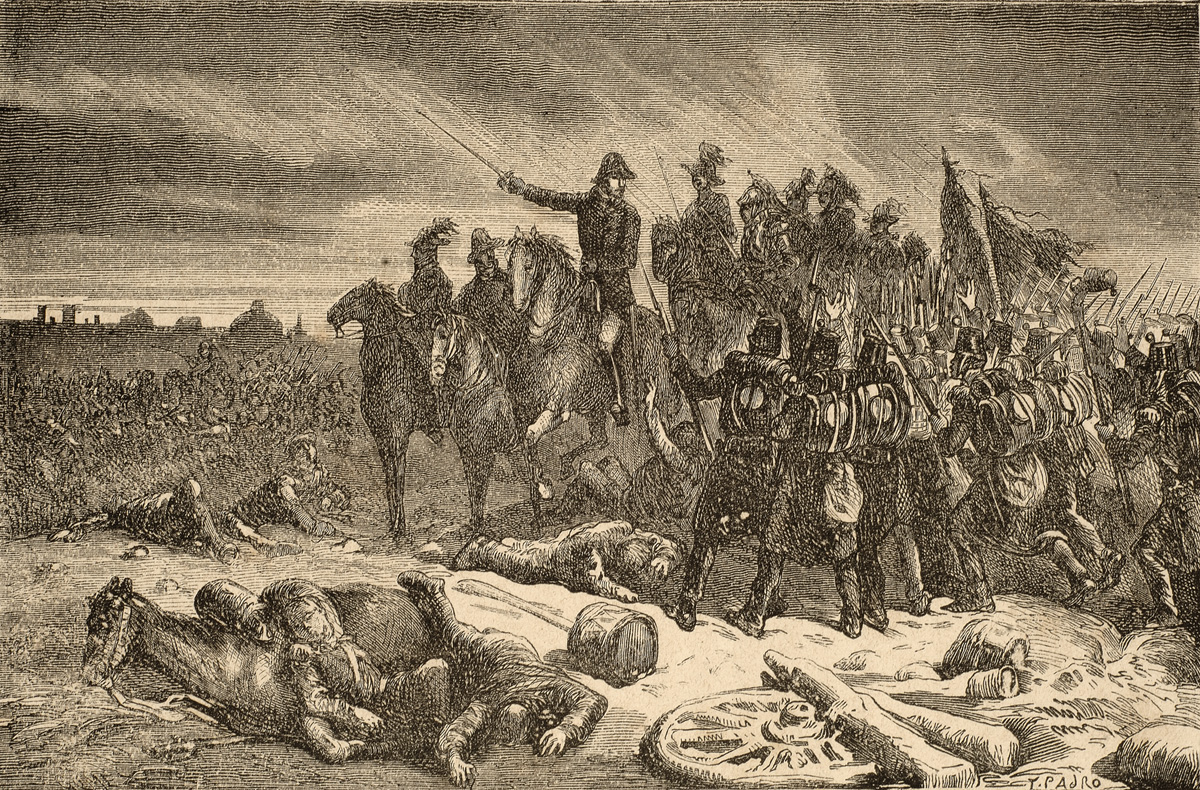
Battle of Luchana

Espartero became, on the death of King Ferdinand VII during 1833, an ardent defender of the claim of his daughter, Isabella II, to the Spanish throne. With the beginning of the First Carlist War, the government sent him to the front as commandant of the province of Biscay, where he decisively defeated the Carlists in many encounters. He was quickly promoted to a divisional command and then made a lieutenant-general. At times he showed qualities as a guerrillero quite equal to those of the Carlists, such as Zumalacarregui and Ramón Cabrera, by his daring marches and surprise maneuvers. When he had to move large forces he was greatly superior to these men as an organizer and a strategist, and he never disgraced his successes by cruelty or needless severity. Twice he obliged the Carlists to end the siege of Bilbao before he was appointed commander-in-chief of the northern army on 17 September 1836. At this time the course of the war seemed to favor the pretender in the Basque provinces and Navarre, even though Infante Carlos had lost his ablest lieutenant, the Basque Zumalacarregui.

== Defeat of the Carlists ==
His military duties as commander of the principal national army did not prevent Espartero from showing for the first time his political ambition. He displayed such radical and reformist inclinations that he became popular among the lower and middle classes; his popularity lasted more than a quarter of a century. During this time, the Progressives, Democrats and Liberals considered him their adviser. In November 1836, he once again forced the Carlists to end the siege of Bilbao. His troops included the British Legion commanded by Sir George de Lacy Evans. This success turned the war against Carlos, who vainly attempted a raid on Madrid, but was defeated in the Battle of Aranzueque. Meanwhile, on 18 June 1837 Espartero was nominated for the first time as the 7th Premier of Spain, until 18 August 1837.

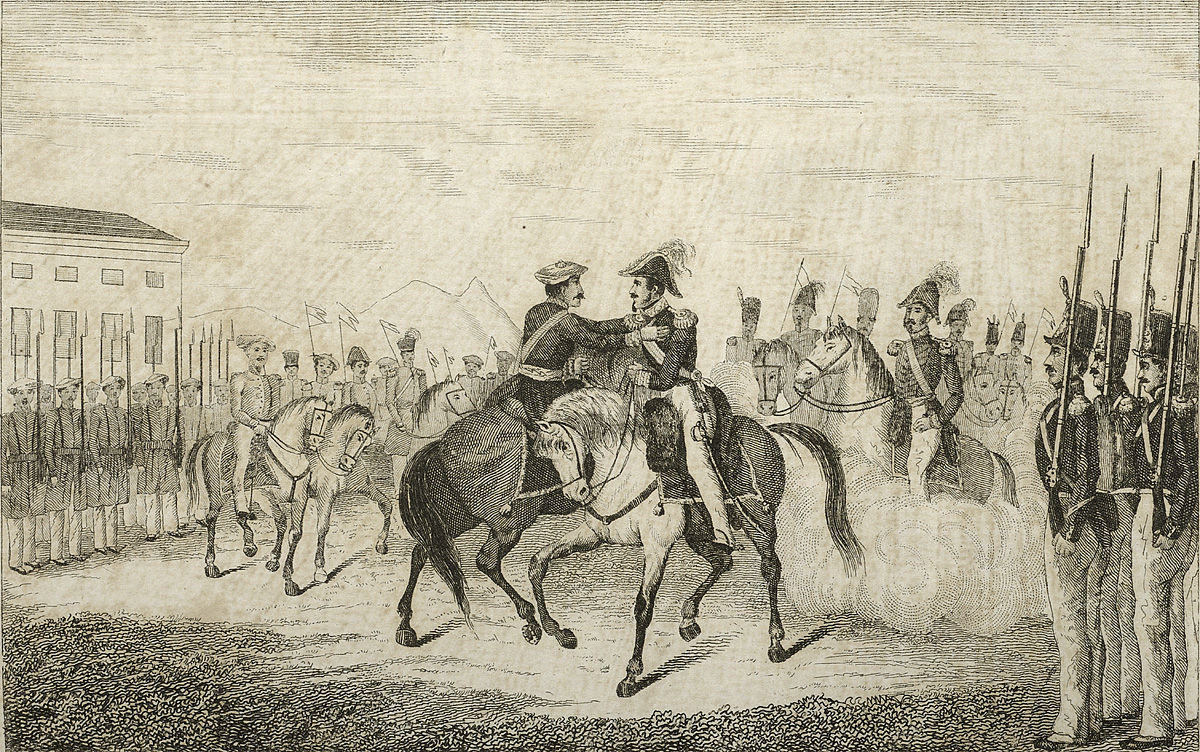
Hug of Vergara, between Espartero and Maroto.

Espartero pursued the enemy and obliged him to hurry northwards, after several defeats. Espartero won the Battle of Ramales on 12 May 1839, earning him the title of Duque de la Victoria.

During 1839, Espartero carefully began negotiations with Maroto and the principal Carlist chiefs of the Basque provinces. These ended with the commanders' acceptance of the general's terms as part of the convention of Vergara, which secured the recognition of the ranks and titles of almost 1,000 Carlist officers. Twenty thousand Carlist volunteers surrendered at Vergara; only the irreconcilables commanded by Cabrera persevered for a while in the central provinces of Spain. However, in 1840, the pro-Isabelle general defeated the last forces of the Carlist insurgency, which had lasted seven years. He was styled El pacificador de España, was made a grandee of the first class, and received two dukedoms.

== Political life ==
Espartero's political opponents, the moderates, desired to amend the progressive Constitution of 1837. In particular, the moderates' proposal to abolish democratically elected local councils threatened to destroy the power base of the progressives. This threat was checked by the radical revolution of 1840, after which the conservatives became marginal and Espartero became the master of the destiny of Spain.

During the last three years of the war, Espartero, who had been elected a deputy, exercised from his distant headquarters such influence over Madrid politics that he twice hastened the end of the cabinet, and obtained office for his own friends. At the end of the war the queen regent and her ministers attempted to eliminate Espartero and his devotees, but a pronunciamiento ensued in Madrid and other large towns which culminated in the marshal's accepting the post of prime minister. He soon became virtually a dictator, as Queen Christina became offended by his popularity and resigned, leaving the kingdom very soon afterwards. The Cortes Generales met and elected Espartero regent by 179 votes to 103 over Agustín Argüelles, who was appointed guardian of the young queen.

Forcing the regent, Maria Cristina, into exile for her conspiracy with the moderates, Espartero himself became regent with the intention of remaining so until the future Queen Isabella II became of age. Espartero's popularity enabled him to defeat moderate military rebellions across Spain during 1841. Yet his ruthless execution of dozens of the conspirators, including many popular fellow war heroes like Diego de Leon, as well as his hasty and ungrateful dissolution of the radical juntas that had ended the rebellions, decreased the popularity of his regency (Maria Cristina told him, "I made you a duke, but I could not make you a gentleman.").

== Rule ==
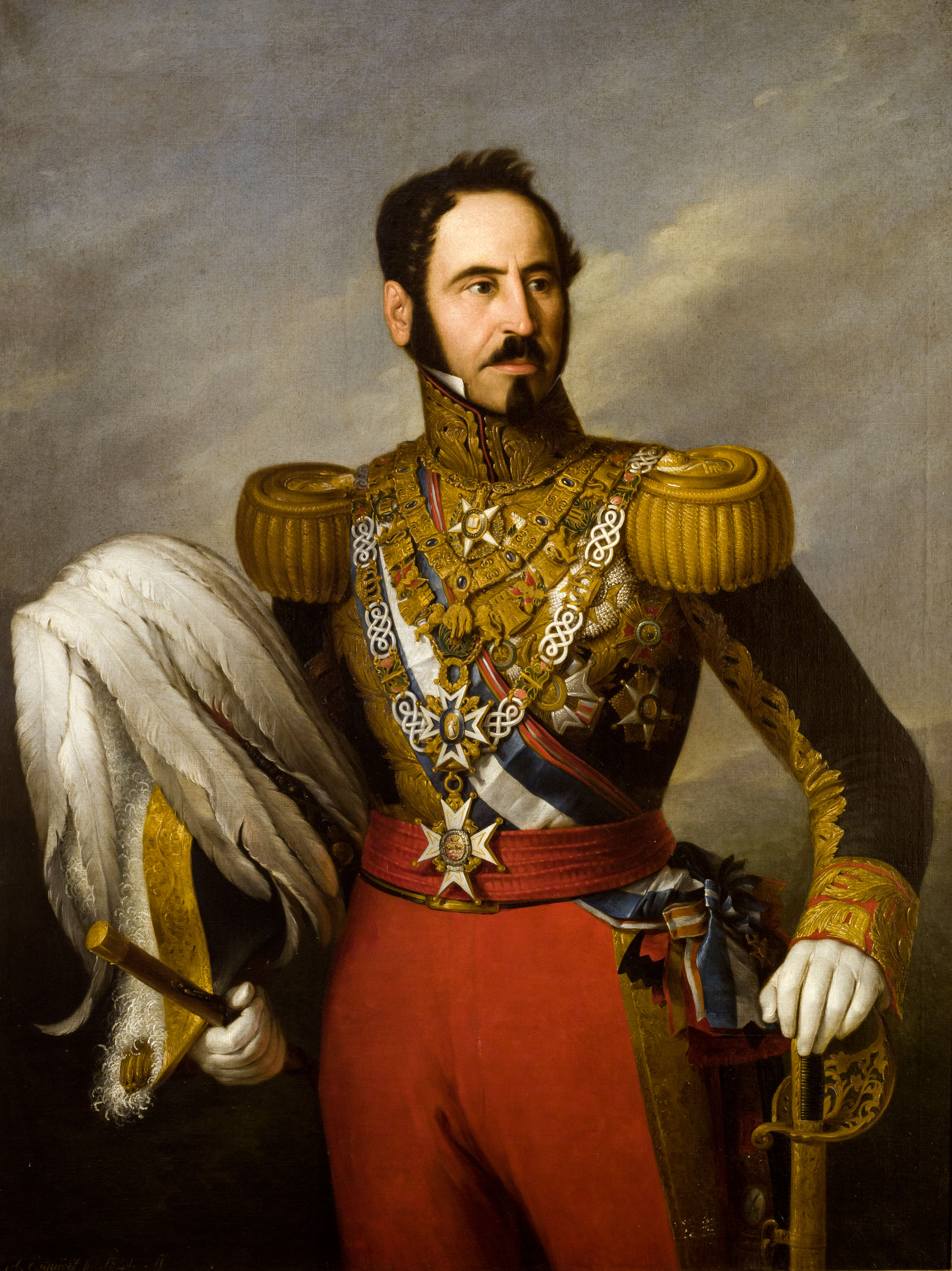
Portrait by Antonio María Esquivel, 1841.

While continuing as regent, Espartero ruled Spain as its 18th Prime Minister for two years, from 16 September 1840 to 21 May 1841, in accordance with his radical and conciliatory disposition by giving special attention to the reorganization of the administration, taxation and finances; declaring all the estates of the church, congregations and religious orders to be national property; and suppressing the diezma, or tithe. He suppressed the Republican rebellions with as much severity as he for the military pronunciamientos of Generals Concha and Diego de León. The latter was shot in Madrid.

An economic slump and rumours of a free-trade deal with the United Kingdom provoked a popular rebellion by the workers and bourgeoisie of Barcelona in 1842. Espartero's ruthless bombardment of the city ended the revolutionary threat, but on his return to Madrid, he was welcomed so weakly that he perceived that his prestige was decreasing. However,a second rebellion in 1843 combined with moderate conspiracies and military uprisings. The rebels declared Queen Isabella of age and, commanded by General Ramón María Narváez y Campos, marched on Madrid, advancing as far as the city's gates. From this position Narváez issued an ultimatum in a dispatch to Espartero, who, deeming resistance useless, embarked at Cadiz on 30 July 1843 for England and lived quietly until 1848, when a royal decree restored to him all his honors and his seat in the senate. Dubbed public enemy number one by the moderates, and directed by their leader Narváez, Espartero was unable to return to his estates in northern Spain until an amnesty was decreed later in the 1840s.

Although Espartero's regime (1840–1843) in reality had done little for Spain's poor, the anti-radical reaction of the moderates made the former regent a folk hero to many workers. Therefore, it was logical that he should become director of the short-lived "progressive Biennium" of 1854–1856, thus becoming the 43rd Prime Minister of Spain on 19 July 1854. However, as Karl Marx observed, the progressive caudillo was a man whose time had passed.

The old marshal vainly endeavoured to keep the demands of his own Progressists reasonable in the Cortes of 1854–1856 and in the great towns, but their excessive demands for reforms and liberties played into the hands of a clerical and reactionary court and of the equally retrograde governing classes. The growing ambition of General O'Donnell constantly clashed with the opinions of Espartero until the latter, in sheer disgust, resigned his premiership and left for Logroño after he had warned the queen that a conflict was imminent between O'Donnell and the Cortes, backed by the Progressist militia. O'Donnell's pronunciamiento in 1856 ended the Cortes, and the militia was disarmed after a struggle in the streets of the capital. Spanish political power was assumed again by the Moderates in 1856.

He was the 42nd Grand Cross of the Order of the Tower and Sword.

== Retirement ==
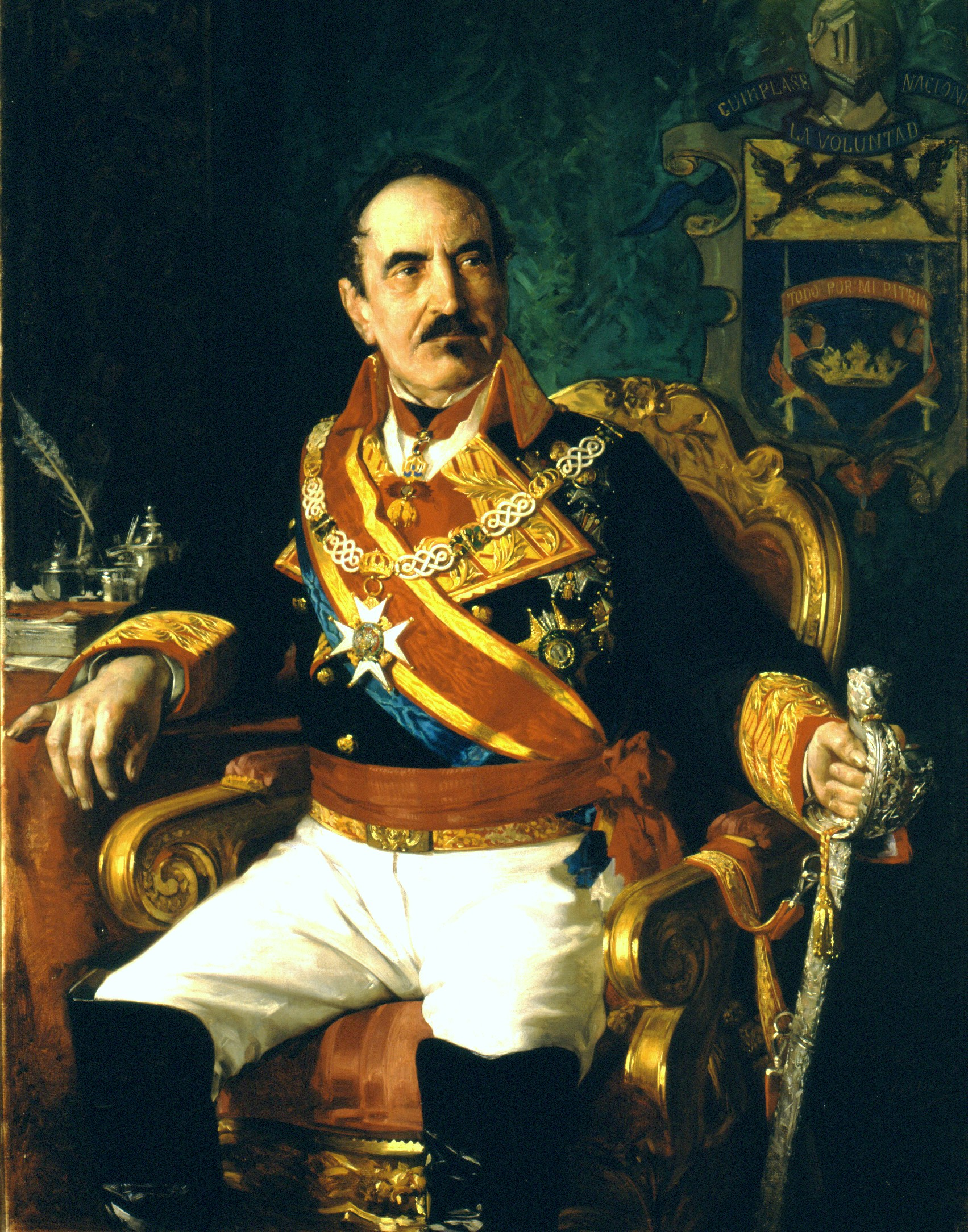
Portrait of the Prince of Vergara, by José Casado del Alisal. Picture gallery of the Spanish Congress of Deputies

After 1856 Espartero resolutely refused to identify himself with active politics but was frequently asked to become involved. On 14 July 1858, he resigned as Premier. He refused to allow himself to be named as a candidate when the Cortes of 1868, after the Revolution, sought a ruler. Espartero, strangely enough, adopted a laconic phrase when successive governments on their advent to power invariably addressed themselves to him. To the Revolution of 1868, the Constituent Cortes of 1869, King Amadeo, the Federal Republic of 1873, the nameless government of Marshal Serrano during 1874, the Bourbon restoration during 1875, he simply said: Cúmplase la voluntad nacional ("Let the national will be accomplished").

King Amadeo made him Prince of Vergara. Along with Manuel Godoy, Espartero has been the only person other than the Prince of Asturias to have held the title of prince in the Kingdom of Spain, traditionally reserved for the heir to the throne.

The Restoration caused a statue to him to be built near the gate of the Retiro Park in Madrid. A magnificent statue and fountain was raised in his memory at Logroño. Spaniards of all political factions, except Carlists and Ultramontanes, paid homage to his memory when he died in La Rioja on 8 January 1879. He was a typical Spanish soldier-politician, but he sometimes had difficulty accommodating himself to courtiers and professional politicians.

== In popular culture ==
- Pedro Armendáriz, Jr plays General Espartero in the 1997 movie Amistad.

== Arms ==
Heraldry of Baldomero Espartero, Prince of Vergara

Coat of arms
(1839-1879)

== See also ==
- Prince of Vergara
- Monument to General Espartero (Madrid)
- Mid-nineteenth century Spain
- First Carlist War
- Espartero's regency
- Ayacuchos

Regnal titles
Preceded by Maria Christina	Regent of Spain; 1840–1843	Succeeded by Isabella II as Queen of Spain
