= Ildefonso Díez de Rivera, Count of Almodóvar =

Spanish noble and politician

Ildefonso Díez de Rivera
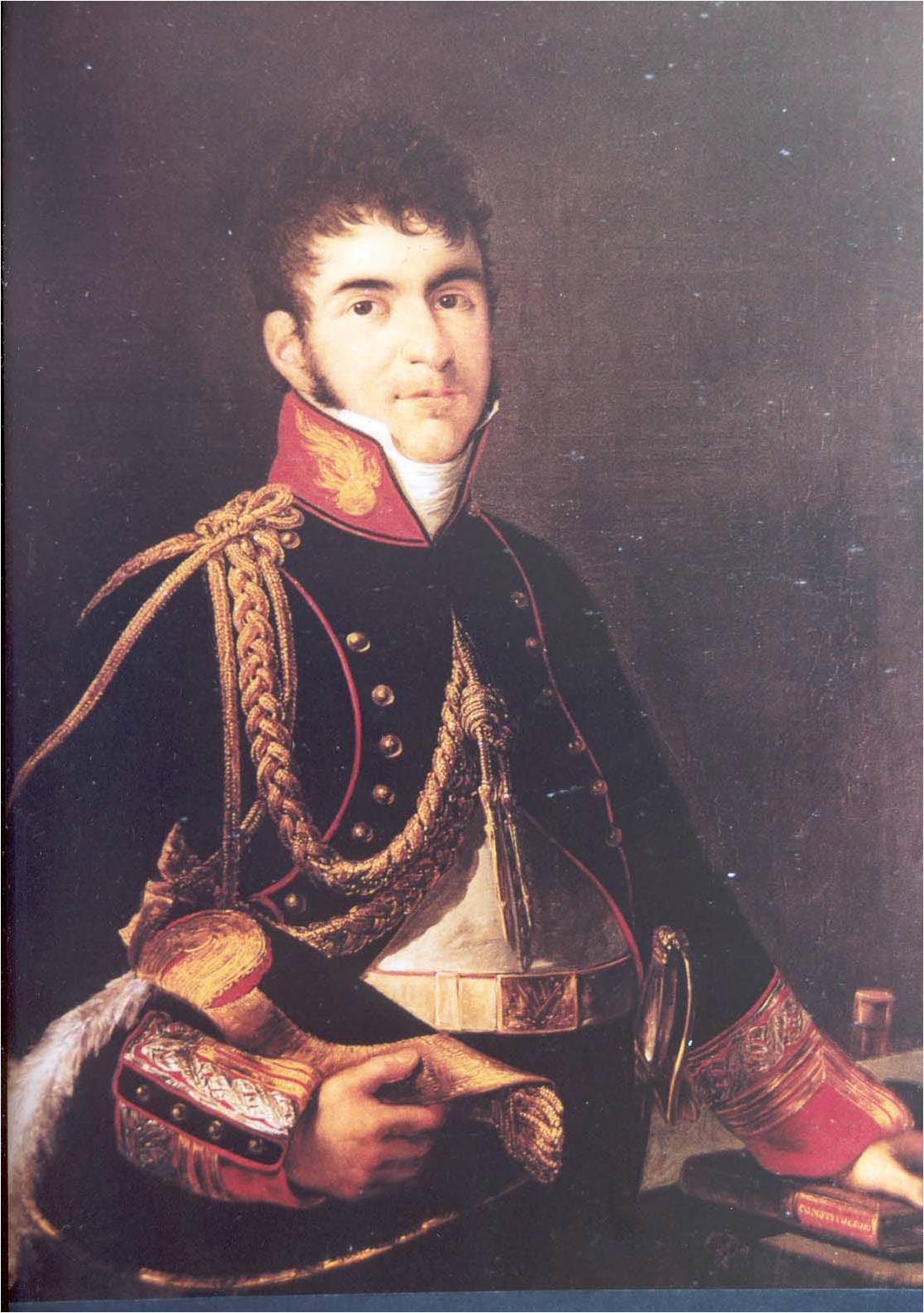
- The Count of Almodóvar

Minister of State

Count of Almodóvar
- In office June 17, 1842 – May 9, 1843
- Preceded by: Antonio González
- Succeeded by: Manuel María de Aguilar
- In office April 27, 1836 – May 15, 1836
- Preceded by: Juan Álvarez Mendizábal
- Succeeded by: Francisco Javier de Istúriz

President of the Senate
- In office 1841–1842
- Preceded by: José María Moscoso de Altamira Quiroga
- Succeeded by: Álvaro Gómez Becerra

Minister of War
- In office February 27, 1837 – July 29, 1837
- Preceded by: Javier Rodríguez Vera
- Succeeded by: Baldomero Espartero
- In office September 27, 1835 – April 27, 1836
- Preceded by: Mariano Quirós
- Succeeded by: José Ramón Rodil

President of the House of Representatives of Spain
- In office July 29, 1834 – May 29, 1835
- Preceded by: Antonio de Posada Rubín de Celis
- Succeeded by: Francisco Javier de Istúriz

Personal details
- Born: January 22, 1777 Granada, Spain
- Died: January 26, 1846 (aged 69) Valencia, Spain

Don Ildefonso Díez de Rivera y Muro (22 January 1777 in Granada, Spain – 26 January 1846 in Valencia, Spain) was a Spanish noble and politician who served as Minister of State in 1836 and as President of the Senate.

He married, the 15 April 1815, Pascuala Ortiz de Almodóvar, 3rd Countess of Almodóvar.

Political offices
Preceded by Juan Álvarez Mendizábal; Acting	Minister of State; 27 April 1836 – 15 May 1836	Succeeded by Francisco Jaiver de Istúriz
Preceded by Antonio González	Minister of State; 17 June 1842 – 9 May 1843	Succeeded by Manuel María de Aguilar
