= José María Calatrava =

Spanish politician (1781–1846)

The Most Excellent José María Calatrava
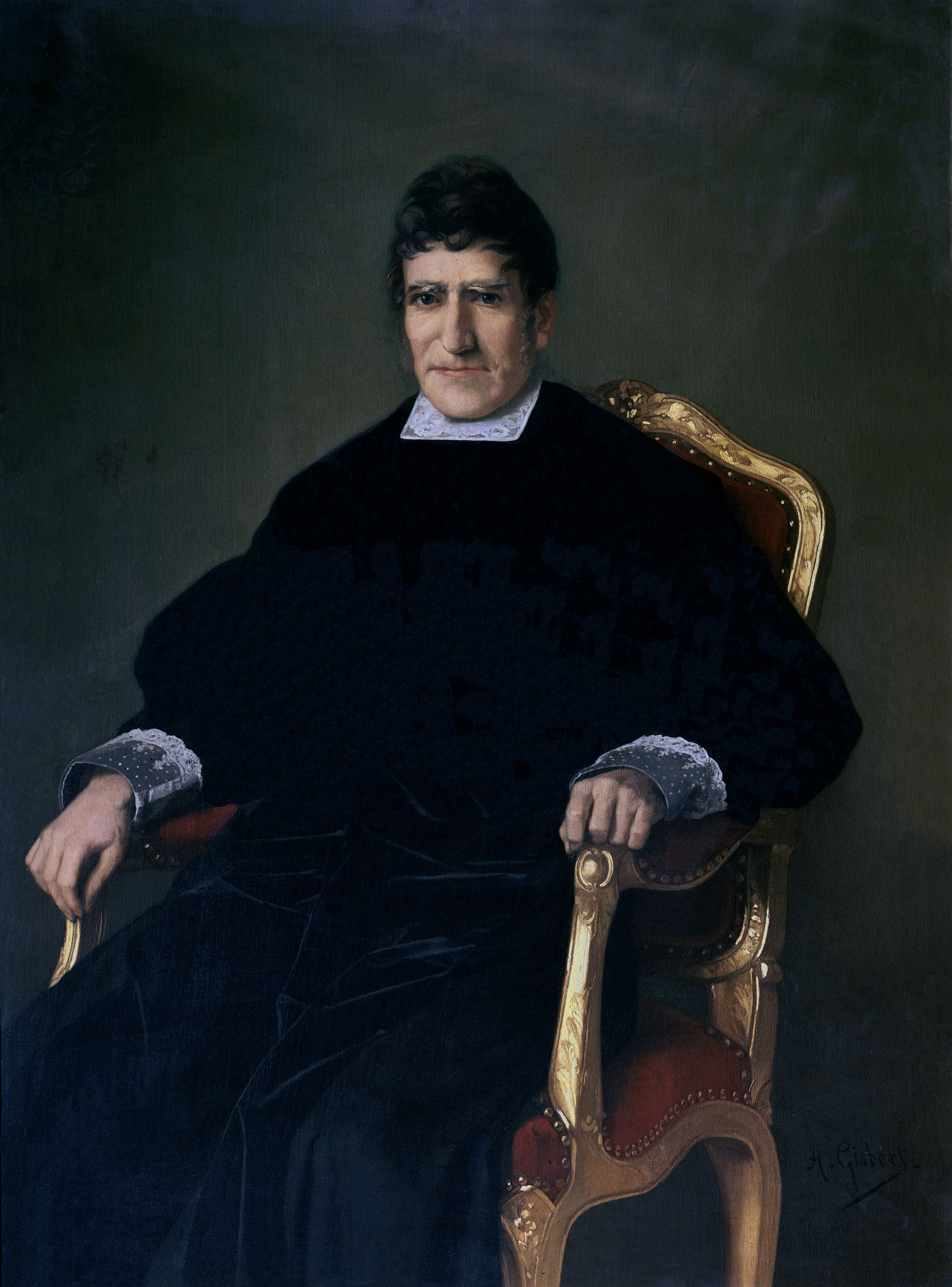
- Portrait by Antonio Gisbert, 1872

Prime Minister of Spain
- In office 14 August 1836 – 18 August 1837
- Monarch: Isabella II
- Preceded by: Francisco Javier de Istúriz
- Succeeded by: The Count of Luchana

Personal details
- Born: 26 February 1781 Mérida, Spain
- Died: 16 January 1846 (aged 65) Madrid, Spain
- Resting place: Pantheon of Illustrious Men
- Party: Progressive

José María Calatrava y Peinado (26 February 1781 in Mérida, Spain – 16 January 1846 in Madrid) was a Spanish politician who served as the Prime Minister of Spain and Minister of State between 1836 and 1837.

The main action of Calatrava's administration was proclaiming the constitution of 1837 which granted freedom of religion in Spain while still requiring the state to support the Roman Catholic Church. This was too drastic a change for many in Spain and it caused the downfall of Calatrava's government.

He finished his career as President of the Supreme Court (1840–1843).

== Biography ==
He was studying law in Seville when war broke out against the French. He played a very active role in opposing the military occupation through the Supreme Council of Extremadura, where he was elected deputy in 1810 to represent Badajoz, and he played a significant role in the Cortes of Cádiz. In 1803, he had married María de la Paz Montero de Espinosa in Badajoz.

Following the restoration of absolutism in 1814, he was arrested and imprisoned in Melilla, at the Fort of Victoria Grande, until he was granted amnesty when the liberals came to power in 1820, He was appointed a judge of the Supreme court and, from 1822 to 1823, served as Minister of Justice as one of the leading figures of the so-called Progressive Party (1836–1837) and a founding member of the Constitutional Society, also known as the Society of the Ring.

The end of the Trienio Liberal led to his exile in Portugal, England, and France, alongside his brother, Ramón María de Calatrava. With the death of Ferdinand VII and the arrival of the regency of María Cristina, he returned to Spain, and following the mutiny at La Granja de San Ildefonso, he was appointed President of the Council of Ministers, replacing Francisco Javier de Istúriz, and entrusted the Ministry of Finance to Juan Álvarez Mendizábal so that he could complete the reform of the public finances. In 1837, he stepped down as president in favor of Eusebio Bardají y Azara. A deputy and senator, he served twice as president of Congress for brief periods (from October 9 to November 9, 1820, and from September 10 to October 18, 1839).

During Espartero’s regency, he became president of the Supreme Court, a position from which he was removed—along with other ministers of the High Court—for refusing to recognize the government of Joaquín María López y López, since that government—according to a resolution of the Court’s plenary session—had been formed in violation of the provisions of the 1837 Constitution.

The figure of Calatrava, described by Antonio Alcalá Galiano as “belonging to a faction halfway between the moderates and the radicals,” has recently been reevaluated by Pedro J. Ramírez in La desventura de la libertad. José María Calatrava and the Fall of the Spanish Constitutional Regime in 1823, based on an analysis of Calatrava’s private archives and his notes from the final stage of the Liberal Triennium, which were not intended for public release. From this analysis, in terms of political theory, Calatrava stands out as the first in Spain to propose the introduction of a motion of no confidence into legislation, which would have resolved the operational problem stemming from the Constitution of Cádiz, which made ministers dependent exclusively on the king’s will while requiring them to answer to the Cortes.

== Personal life ==
Calatrava y Peinado was an active Freemason, at the “La Templanza” Masonic Lodge and operated under the name of "Brother Tiberio Graco." He was associated with the Grand Orient of the "Moderns" faction, based in Madrid.

== Bibliography ==
- Congress of Deputies. José María Calatrava Peinado

Political offices
Preceded by Francisco Javier de Istúriz	Prime Minister of Spain; 14 August 1836 – 18 August 1837	Succeeded by The Count of Luchana
Preceded by Francisco Javier de Istúriz	Minister of State; 14 August 1836 – 18 August 1837	Succeeded by Eusebio Bardají
