= Eusebio Bardají y Azara =

Spanish politician and diplomat

The Most Excellent Eusebio Bardají
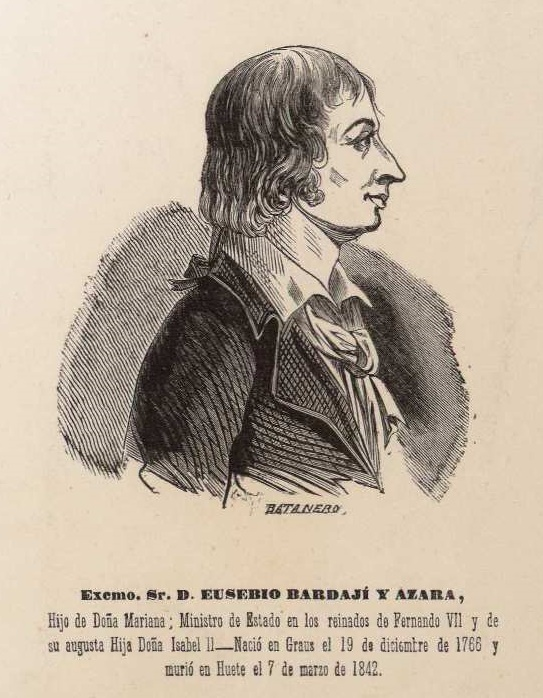

Prime Minister of Spain
- In office 18 October 1837 – 16 December 1837
- Monarch: Isabella II
- Preceded by: Baldomero Espartero
- Succeeded by: Narciso Fernández de Heredia

Minister of State
- In office 18 August 1837 – 16 December 1837
- Monarch: Isabella II
- Prime Minister: Baldomero Espartero; Himself
- Preceded by: José María Calatrava y Peinado
- Succeeded by: Narciso Fernández de Heredia
- In office 4 March 1821 – 8 January 1822
- Monarch: Ferdinand VII
- Preceded by: Joaquín Anduaga Cuenca
- Succeeded by: Ramón López-Pelegrín
- In office 27 May 1810 – 6 February 1812; Interim since 20 May 1810; Disputed with Mariano Luis de Urquijo
- Head of State: Council of Regency
- Preceded by: Nicolás Ambrosio Garro y Arizcun
- Succeeded by: José García de León y Pizarro
- In office 2 June 1808 – 7 July 1808; As senior official in charge of the ministry
- Steward: Joachim Murat
- Preceded by: Francisco Gil de Taboada
- Succeeded by: Mariano Luis de Urquijo

Minister of War
- Interim
- In office 20 May 1810 – 19 October 1810; Disputed with Gonzalo O'Farrill
- Prime Minister: Himself
- Head of State: Council of Regency
- Preceded by: Francisco de Eguía
- Succeeded by: José de Heredia y Velarde

Personal details
- Born: 19 December 1776 Graus, Spain
- Died: 7 March 1842 (aged 65) Huete, Spain
- Party: Realista Moderado

Eusebio Bardají y Azara (19 December 1776 – 7 March 1842) was a Spanish politician and diplomat who briefly served as the Prime Minister of Spain in 1837. He also held other offices such as Minister of State. In addition, he was a senator for Cuenca from 1837 to 1840.

Political offices
Preceded by José María Calatrava	Minister of State; 18 August 1837 – 16 December 1837	Succeeded by The Count of Heredia-Spínola
Preceded by The Count of Luchana	Prime Minister of Spain; 18 October 1837 – 16 December 1837	Succeeded by The Count of Heredia-Spínola
