= Prince of Vergara (title) =

Principality of Vergara
- Creation date: 2 January 1872
- Created by: Amadeo I
- Peerage: Peerage of Spain
- First holder: Baldomero Fernández-Espartero y Álvarez de Faria, Prince of Vergara
- Extinction date: 1879

Prince of Vergara (Spanish: Príncipe de Vergara) was a life title in the Peerage of Spain, granted in 1872 by Amadeo I to Baldomero Espartero, who was Regent of Spain from 1840 to 1843. The title makes reference to the Convention of Vergara, a symbolic embrace between Espartero and Rafael Maroto which put an end to the First Carlist War in 1839.

As a life title, it was not inheritable and thus ceased to exist after Espartero's death in 1879.

== History ==
When Isabella II was dethroned by the Glorious Revolution, the provisional government offered the Spanish Crown to Espartero, an offer that the general rejected. The throne would finally be accepted in December 1870 by Amadeo of Savoy, Duke of Aosta, who visited Espartero in 1871 at his palace in Logroño.

Espartero went to meet king Amadeo at the railway station dressed in a gala suit as captain general, accompanied by civil and military authorities of the city. Both traveled together to the general's house, where the monarch spent two days. The nature and content of their conversations during the time they spent together is unknown, but when Espartero accompanied him back to the train station, he displayed signs of joy, respect and seemed to treat him as the legitimate king of Spain, a recognition that could very well be the one Amadeo was looking for.

On his return to Madrid in early January 1872, the king granted him the title of Prince of Vergara with the style of Highness. Although Spanish customs did not allow any prince titles apart from Prince of Asturias (held by the heir to the throne), Amadeo granted the title more in line with his native Italian peerage traditions, where non-royal princes were common. Along with "Prince of the Peace", Vergara has been the only non-royal princely title in the history of Spain.

== Princes of Vergara (1872) ==
- Baldomero Fernández-Espartero y Álvarez de Toro, Prince of Vergara (1793-1879)

== See also ==
- Príncipe de Vergara (Madrid Metro)
- Prince of the Peace
