= Battle of Luchana =

Battle of the First Carlist War

Coordinates: 43°17′35″N 2°58′17″W

- Part of First Carlist War
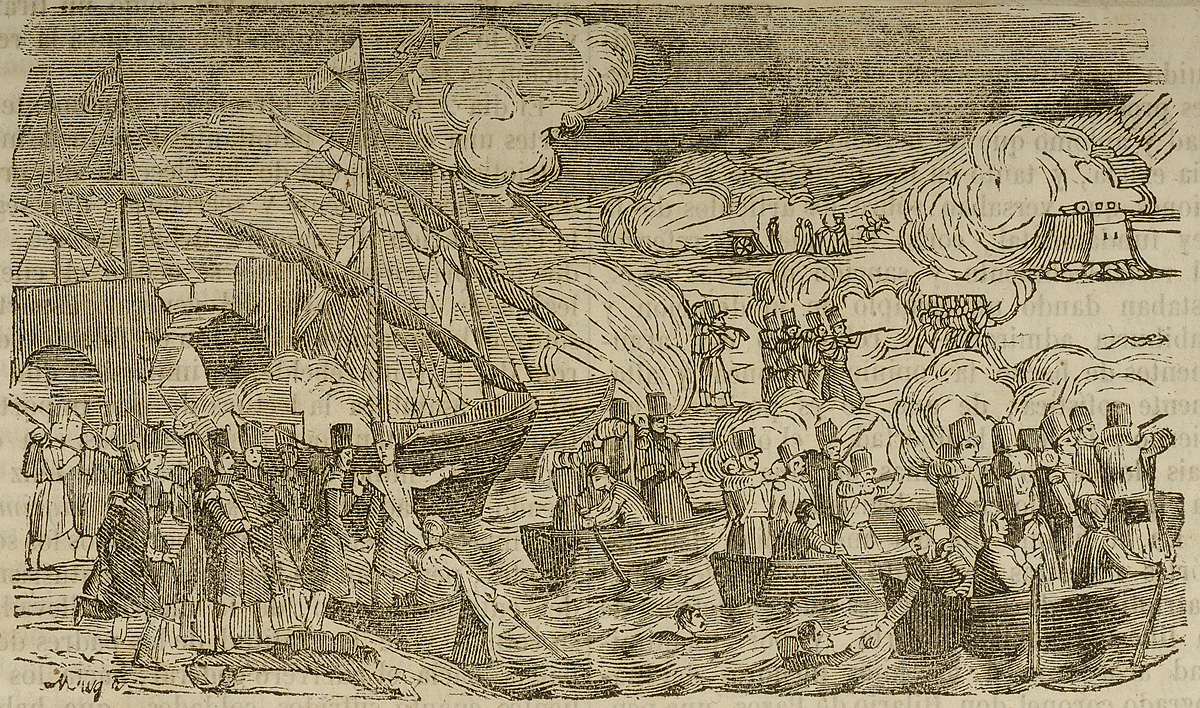
Date	23–24 December 1836
Location	Bilbao and vicinities, Basque Country, Spain
Result	Liberal victory

Belligerents
Carlists supporting Infante Carlos of Spain	Liberals (Isabelinos or Cristinos) supporting Isabella II of Spain and her regent mother Maria Christina

Commanders and leaders
	Baldomero Espartero

The Battle of Luchana (Lutxana in Basque) occurred at Bilbao and its vicinities during the night of December 23, 1836 and went on until December 24, 1836. The Carlists were besieging Bilbao and controlled the water and land routes towards the city. The battle of Luchana took place in the district belonging to the parish of Deusto and the municipality of Erandio, on the banks of the Asúa River, which empties into the Nervión at the spot known as Luchana. The Carlists were defeated and the siege of Bilbao was lifted.
