= Francisco Javier de Istúriz =

Spanish politician and diplomat

The Most Excellent Francisco Javier de Istúriz
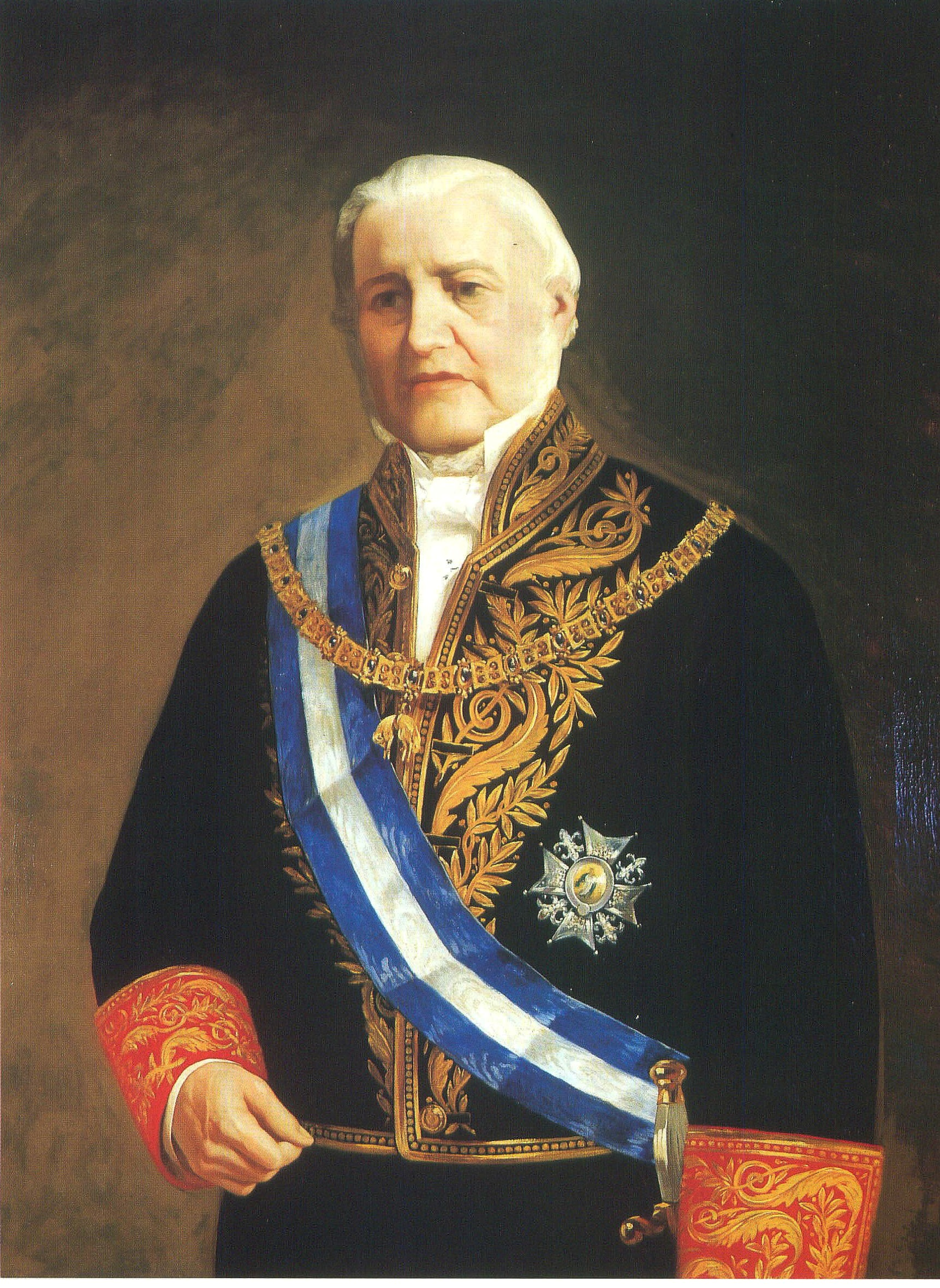
- Portrait by José María Galván, c. 1879

Prime Minister of Spain
- In office 15 May 1836 – 14 August 1836
- Monarch: Isabella II
- Preceded by: Juan Álvarez Mendizábal
- Succeeded by: José María Calatrava
- In office 5 April 1846 – 28 January 1847
- Monarch: Isabella II
- Preceded by: Ramón María Narváez
- Succeeded by: Duke of Sotomayor
- In office 14 January 1858 – 30 June 1858
- Monarch: Isabella II
- Preceded by: Francisco Armero
- Succeeded by: The Count of Lucena

Personal details
- Born: 31 October 1785 Cádiz, Spain
- Died: 2 April 1871 (aged 80) Madrid
- Party: Realista Moderado

Francisco Javier de Istúriz y Montero (31 October 1785 in Cádiz – 2 April 1871 in Madrid) was a Spanish politician and diplomat who served as the Prime Minister of Spain. He also served as the President of the Senate and President of the Congress of Deputies several times.

== Personal life ==
Istúriz y Montero was a Freemason and operated a Masonic Lodge known as "El Pireo" out of his own home, where he was known by the name of "Brother Sagunto." He was associated with the Gran Oriente de España (GOdE).

Political offices
Preceded by Juan Álvarez Mendizábal	Prime Minister of Spain; 15 May 1836 – 14 August 1836	Succeeded by José María Calatrava
Preceded by The Count of Almodóvar	Minister of State; 15 May 1836 – 14 August 1836	Succeeded by José María Calatrava
Preceded by Ramón María Narváez	Prime Minister of Spain; 5 April 1846 – 28 January 1847	Succeeded by The Duke of Sotomayor
Preceded by Ramón María Narváez	Minister of State; 5 April 1846 – 28 January 1847	Succeeded by The Duke of Sotomayor
Preceded by Francisco Armero	Prime Minister of Spain; 14 January 1858 – 30 June 1858	Succeeded by The Count of Lucena
Preceded by Francisco de Paula Martínez de la Rosa	Minister of State; 14 January 1858 – 30 June 1858	Succeeded by The Count of Lucena
