= Diego de León, 1st Count of Belascoáin =

Spanish military figure

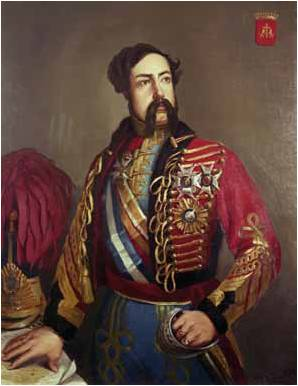
Diego de León.

Don Diego de León y Navarrete (March 30, 1807 in Córdoba – October 15, 1841 in Madrid) was a Spanish military figure. He was the son of Diego Antonio de León and Maria Teresa Navarrete y Valdivia. As a young man he joined the Spanish army as a cavalryman, and was promoted to the rank of captain at the age of 17.

He fought in the southern front during the First Carlist War on the side of the Liberals (Christinos), and made himself famous for marching at the head of his lancers and riding at the spot where the enemy was most numerous. At Arcos de la Frontera, in charge of a squadron of 72 horsemen, he managed to detain a Carlist column until Liberal reinforcements arrived. He was awarded the Cross of Saint Ferdinand as a result (Cruz Laureada de San Fernando).

On the northern front, he fought at the Battle of Mendigorría and later captured Belascoáin from the Carlists in 1838, thereby earning his noble title.

In 1840, he was named Captain-General of New Castile.

He was a member of the Moderate Party (Partido Moderado), and with the fall of the regent María Cristina de Borbón during the reign of Isabel II, he went into exile in France. In 1841, he joined O'Donnell's revolt against Baldomero Espartero. Diego de León was arrested and later executed by firing squad.
