= Juan Álvarez Mendizábal =

Spanish economist and politician

The Most Excellent Juan Álvarez Mendizábal
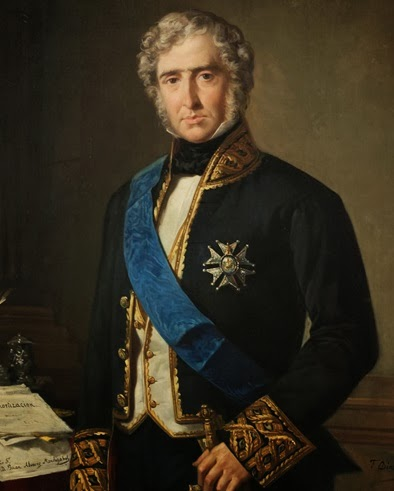

Prime Minister of Spain
- In office 25 September 1835 – 15 May 1836
- Monarch: Isabella II
- Preceded by: José María Queipo de Llano
- Succeeded by: Francisco Javier de Istúriz

Personal details
- Born: 25 February 1790 Chiclana de la Frontera, Andalusia, Spain
- Died: 3 November 1853 (aged 63) Madrid, Spain
- Resting place: Pantheon of Illustrious Men
- Party: Partido Progresista

Juan Álvarez Mendizábal (born Juan Álvarez Méndez; 25 February 1790 – 3 November 1853) was a Spanish economist and politician who served as Prime Minister of Spain from 25 September 1835 to 15 May 1836.

== Biography ==
He was born to Rafael Álvarez Montañés, a cloth merchant, and Margarita Méndez, of converso origin. He was given training in banking, first working in a bank and then in the military administration during the Peninsular War.

In 1820, he was appointed military supplier of the troops that Ferdinand VII had sent to America to suppress the revolts. Taking advantage of this situation he financed Rafael del Riego's military uprising. At the time of the coup he became a Freemason as a member of "Taller Sublime", a Cádiz masonic lodge. During the Trienio liberal Mendizábal renounced to the Public Administration, although he had actively participated in the revolts against absolutism.

When Ferdinand VII renounced the Constitution of 1812 and restored his absolute power in 1823, Mendizábal and many other revolutionary liberals went into exile: in the United Kingdom he opened a trade business.

In 1835, under José María Queipo de Llano's presidency, he was appointed Minister of the Treasury. On 14 September he succeeded Queipo de Llano, keeping the Treasury portfolio during a delicate economic situation due to the First Carlist War's military expenses. Queen Regent Maria Christina thought a liberal prime minister would hold the rebellions. Mendizábal's political program included the Desamortización Eclesiástica ("Ecclesiastical Confiscations of Mendizábal"), the immediate end to the Carlist war and the elimination of the public debt.

The Liberal movement, the Queen Regent and Mendizábal were supported by the new owners of the confiscated properties, though the measures only benefited the big land tycoons. The impossibility of ending the Carlist revolts forced Mendizábal's resignation in 1836. A few months later a revolt in La Granja made the Queen accept a radical government and the restoration of the Spanish Constitution of 1812. Mendizábal was appointed Minister of Finance and a series of revolutionary measures were taken: the abolition of tithe and señoríos, freedom of the press, confiscation of the Church properties). In 1837 a more moderate government was elected. Mendizábal was again appointed Minister of Finance in 1843 but had to go in exile again when the moderates came back to power.

In 1847, he came back to Spain and occupied a seat in the Cortes until his death in 1853.

== See also ==
- Spanish confiscation
- Monument to Mendizábal (Madrid)

== Sources ==
- Biography of Mendizábal

Political offices
| Preceded by Miguel Ricardo de Álava | Prime Minister of Spain; 25 September 1835 – 15 May 1836 | Succeeded by Francisco Javier de Istúriz |
| Preceded by Miguel Ricardo de Álava | Minister of State; Acting; 4 October 1835 – 27 April 1836 | Succeeded by The Count of Almodóvar |
