= First Carlist War =

Civil war in Spain from 1833 to 1840

- Part of the Carlist Wars
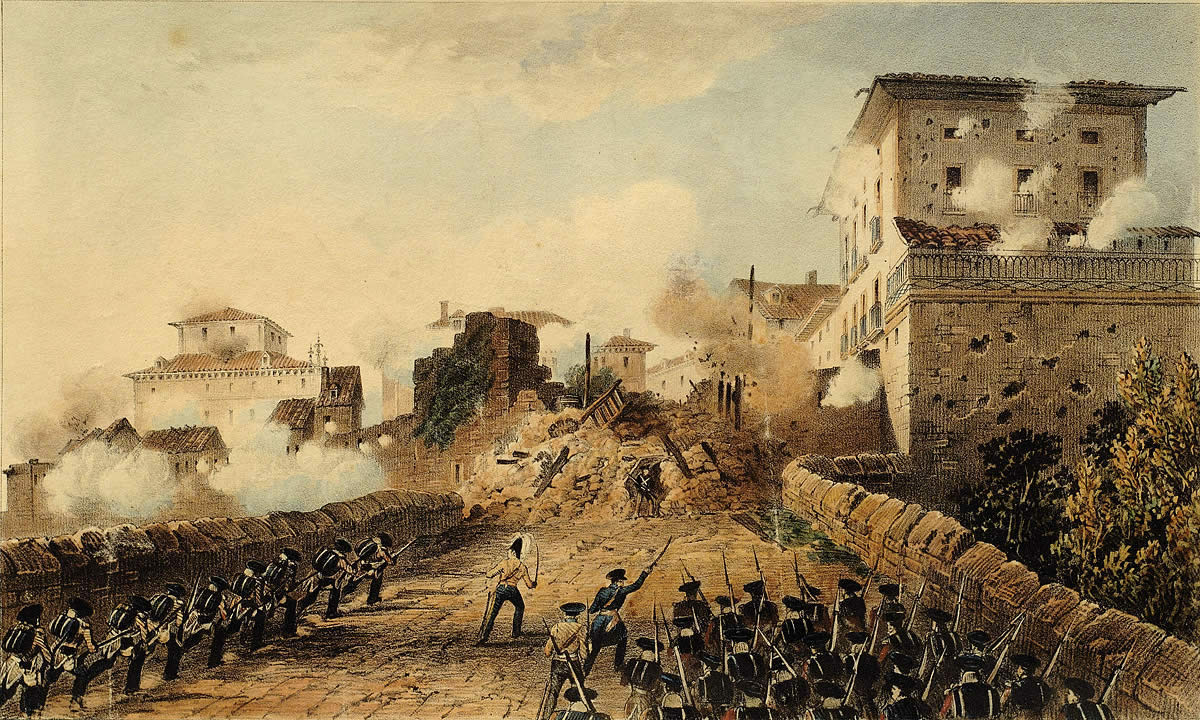
- The Battle of Irún, 17 May 1837.
Date	29 September 1833 – 6 July 1840 (6 years, 9 months and 7 days)
Location	Spain
Result	Liberal victory: Lord Eliot Convention; Convention of Vergara

Belligerents
Carlists; Supported by: Portugal (until 1834)	Liberals; Supported by: France; United Kingdom; Portugal (from 1834)

Commanders and leaders
See list: Carlos V; Tomás Zumalacárregui; Ramón Cabrera; Rafael Maroto; González Moreno; Miguel Gómez Damas; Sebestian Gabriel	See list: Maria Christina; Isabella II; Genaro de Quesada; José Ramón Rodil; Francisco Espoz; Luis Fernández; Baldomero Espartero; Isidro de Alaix; Jerónimo Valdés; Marcelino de Oraá; Manuel O'Doyle; De Lacy Evans; (July Monarchy) Joseph Bernelle; (Kingdom of Portugal) Count of Antas

Strength
Unknown	500,000 mobilized throughout the war; Over 18,000 French, British, Belgian, and Portuguese volunteers

Casualties and losses
Carlists: 15,000–60,000	Liberals: 15,000–65,000; French: 7,700; British: 2,500; Portuguese: 50
- 5% of the Spanish population died, with half this number being military deaths; 111,000–306,000 including civilians

The First Carlist War was a civil war in Spain from 1833 to 1840, the first of three Carlist Wars. It was fought between two factions over the succession to the throne and the nature of the Spanish monarchy: the conservative and devolutionist supporters of the late king's brother, Carlos de Borbón (or Carlos V), became known as Carlists (carlistas), while the progressive and centralist supporters of the regent, Maria Christina, acting for Isabella II of Spain, were called Liberals (liberales), cristinos or isabelinos. Aside from being a war of succession, on the question who was the rightful successor to King Ferdinand VII of Spain, the Carlists' goal was the return to an absolute monarchy, while the Liberals sought to defend the constitutional monarchy.

It was the largest and most deadly civil war in nineteenth-century Europe and fought by more men than the Spanish War of Independence. It might have been the largest counter-revolutionary movement in 19th-century Europe depending on the figures. Furthermore, it is considered the "last great European conflict of the pre-industrial age". The conflict was responsible for the deaths of 5% of the 1833 Spanish population—with military casualties alone amounting to half this number. It was mostly fought in the Southern Basque Country, Maestrazgo, and Catalonia and characterized by repeated raids and reprisals against both armies and civilians.

Importantly, it was a precursor to the idea of the two Spains that would surface during the Spanish Civil War a century later.

== Background ==
Before the start of the Carlist Wars, Spain was in a deep social, economic, and political crisis as a result of mismanagement by Charles IV and Ferdinand VII, and had stagnated since the reforms and successes of Charles III of Spain.

=== Demographic ===
Spain had only slightly more than 20 inhabitants per square kilometer in the early 19th century, much less than other European countries. At the start of the Carlist War, the population was approximately 12.3 million people.

=== Loss of the colonies ===
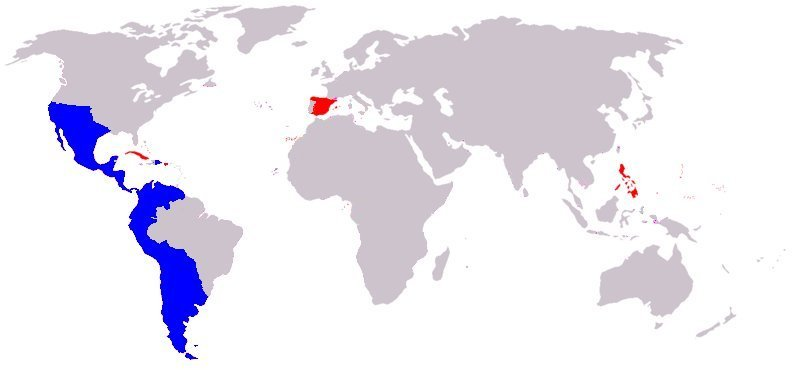
Map of territories that became independent from Spain in said wars (blue)

While the Spanish American wars of independence began in 1808, more than two decades before the death of Ferdinand VII, the social, economic and political effects of the American conflicts still were of great significance in the peninsula. In fact, not until the start of the Carlist conflict did Spain abandon all plans of military reconquest. Between 1792 and 1827 the value in millions of reales of imports of goods, imports of money, and exports from the Americas had decreased by a factor of 3.80, 28.0, and 10.3 respectively.

Furthermore, various conflicts with the British and especially the Battle of Trafalgar had left the Spanish without the naval strength to maintain healthy maritime trade with the Americas and the Philippines, leading to historically low overseas revenue. Between 1792 and 1827, Spanish foreign imports decreased from 714.9 million reals to 226.2 and exports decreased from 397 million to 221.2. This economic weakness would prove crucial at restraining Spain's ability to climb out of the woes of the next decades and leading up to the Carlist wars.

=== War of Spanish Independence and the Napoleonic Wars ===
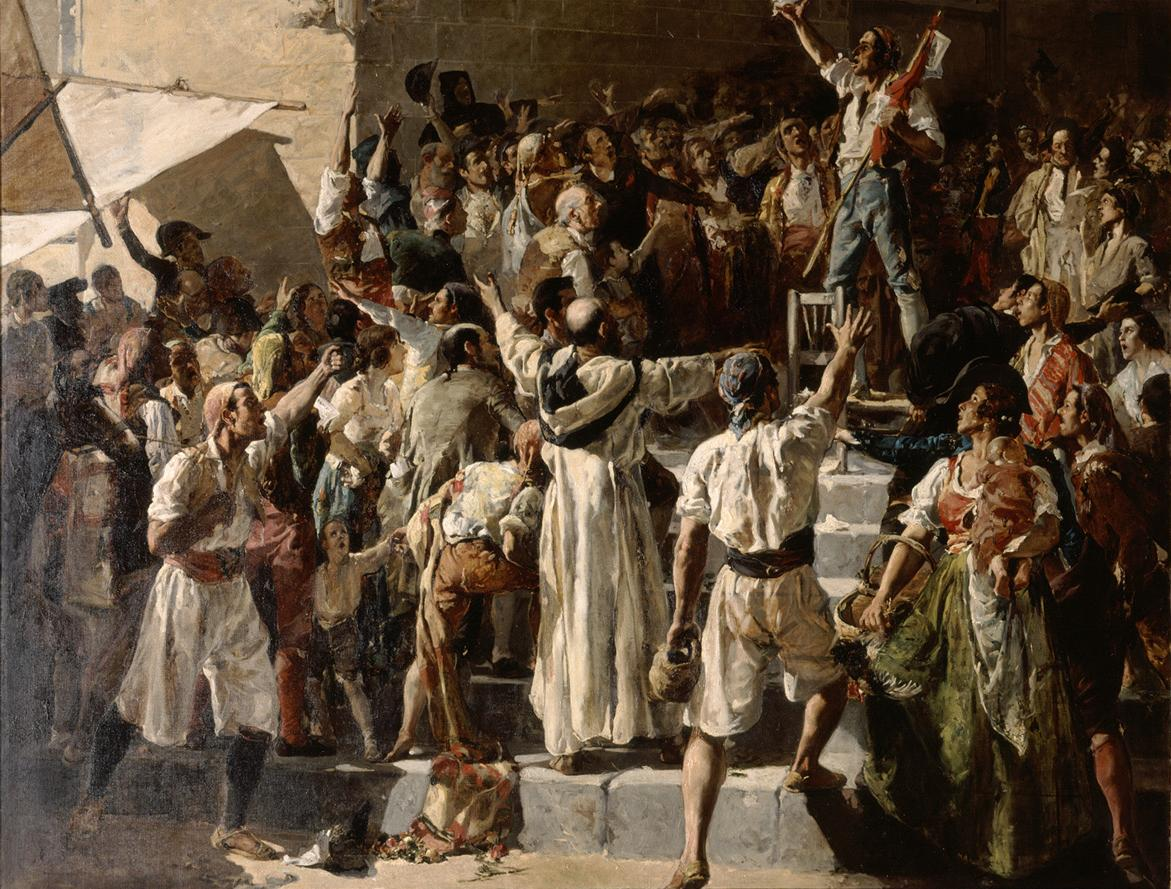
Joaquín Sorolla: Valencians prepare to resist the invaders (1884)

While Spain had been an ally of Napoleon, this changed in 1808 after France occupied Spain and installed Joseph Bonaparte as King in place of the Bourbons. Although the high nobility accepted this change, the Spanish people did not and soon a bloody guerilla war erupted. This war lasted until 1814, and during those years Spain would be ravaged by the estimated deaths of over a million civilians out of the twelve that populated Spain at the time. Furthermore, French troops heavily looted the country, especially as the focus of the army shifted towards the French invasion of Russia.

=== Economic ===
The gale after Trafalgar, depicted by Thomas Buttersworth.

In the 19th century, Spain was heavily in debt and in a dire situation economically. Various conflicts with the British and especially the Battle of Trafalgar had left the Spanish without the naval strength to maintain healthy maritime trade with the Americas and the Philippines, leading to historically low overseas revenue and ability to control the colonies. The de facto independence of many of these colonies during the Napoleonic Wars and later wars of independence further strained the royal coffers. Between 1824 and 1833 the average annual income was barely more than half the pre-wars' level. Additionally, the political instability further constrained Spain's ability to collect taxes—the Riego revolt meant the government could only collect 12% of its projected revenue for the first half of 1820.

Spain had been heavily looted during the Napoleonic Wars and had only managed to fight as a junior partner under British leadership, financed and even clothed by British subsidies. Nonetheless, the Spanish government would be overburdened with costs needed to establish control over the country over the following decades—88% of taxes collected in February 1822 went to fund the military—which increased when Ferdinand maintained a French garrison between 1824 and 1828 "as a Varangian Guard" to ensure his power. In 1833, Spain's forces comprised 100,000 Royalist Volunteers, 50,000 regulars, and 652 generals.

The progressives of the Trienio had managed to secure loans from British financiers, which Ferdinand then defaulted on. This made securing further loans even harder for the fledgling Spanish economy. Some historians argue that the Pragmatic Sanction was encouraged in order to please the politically-active liberal financiers, and in fact it was in the interest of loan repayment that the British and French protected the cristinos during the war. However, the former statement can be explained by the growing influence of Maria Cristina in the courts.

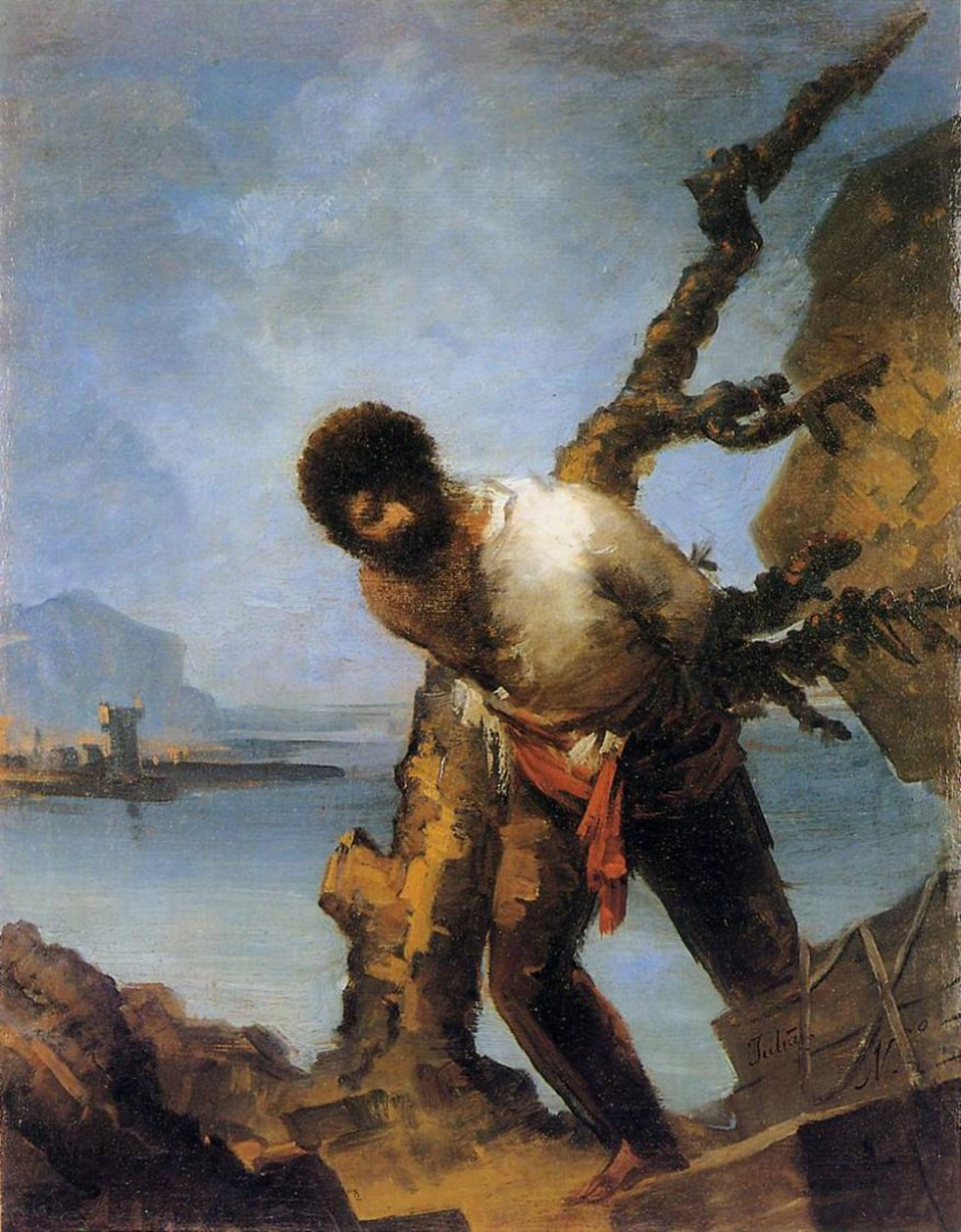
The Castaway, also known as The Smuggler, painted by Asensio Julià in 1815

Ferdinandine Deflation
According to Sanchez Montero, p. 89 View source data.

Furthermore, Spain was undergoing a deflationary spiral caused by both the Napoleonic War and the loss of the colonies, which left Spanish producers without the incredibly valuable market to sell their goods to as well as the Mint without the metal crucial to make coins. In order to protect the local industry, Spain established protectionist policies, which served to greatly encourage a black market. In fact, Great Britain was exporting three times as many products into Gibraltar than into the rest of Spain despite the dramatic discrepancy in population size.

Moreover, Spain's agricultural production had greatly stalled during Ferdinand's reign, partly due to the wars but also importantly due to a lack of improvements in practices and technology. The effects of poor harvests in 1803–1804 and the most "serious shortages of food in a century and a half" that resulted were exacerbated by the Peninsular War. Still, agriculture accounted for 85% of the Spanish GDP. While output had recovered to pre-war levels, the prices remained unattainable for many peasants. As most of the land was concentrated on the hands of wealthy nobles and the church who had no incentive to increase production, "vast tracks [sic?] [of land] lay totally uncultivated". Areas like the Basque Country were privileged exceptions to a Spain where "the majority of the population was made up of landless workers who eked out a miserable existence." One obstacle to increasing the productive use of land were the wide limits on noble, ecclesiastical, and town-owned lands' sale. These lands could be very profitable, such as in the case in mid-1700s Castile and León where land owned by the Church accounted for one-fourth of rent collected. All in all, unsellable land accounted for more than half of Spain's farmland, thus hiking the price of land and making it impossible for small farmers to acquire land.

In fact, many Spanish dishes were invented in those times to combat the lack of food. In 1817 one finds the first reference to Spanish omelette as "two to three eggs in tortilla for 5 or 6 [people] as our women do know how to make it big and thick with fewer eggs, mixing potatoes, breadcrumbs or whatever."

Ferdinand's governmental gridlock only further exacerbated the economic situation, as they were unable to create significant economic policies to tackle the issues or encourage internal demand. In fact, Ferdinand clashed with burghers as to how to manage the rural areas which were now extremely sparsely populated, to the shock of international observers. The sparseness of population as well as the general predicaments of Spanish labourers resulted in gross mismanagement of arable landand inability of Spain to significantly restart industrial and commercial activity after the Napoleonic War. The economic troubles were portrayed at the time as a result of moral faults in society, introduced by either one's political enemies or the war.

=== National politics ===
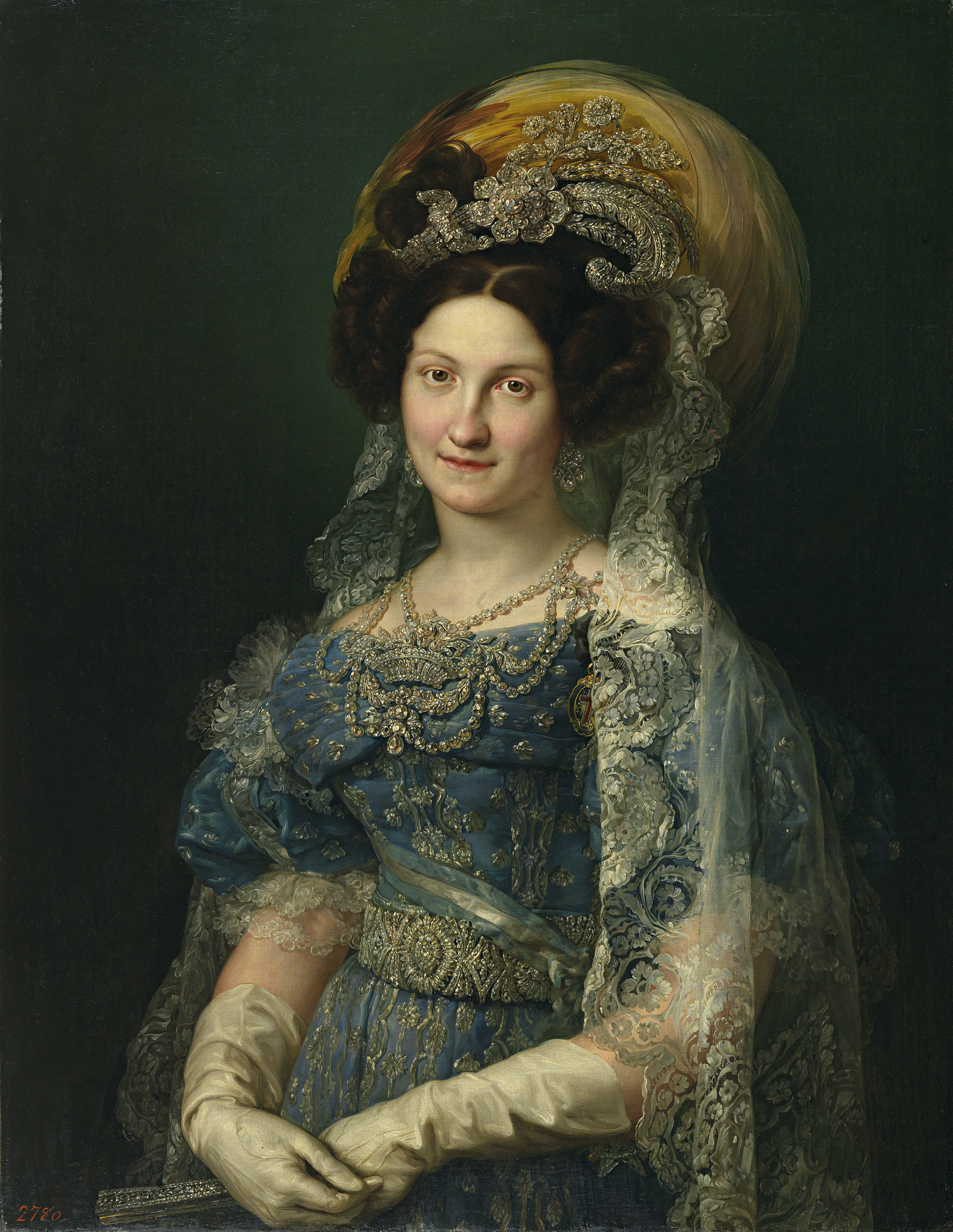
Portrait of Regent Maria Christina by Vicente López y Portaña, 1830

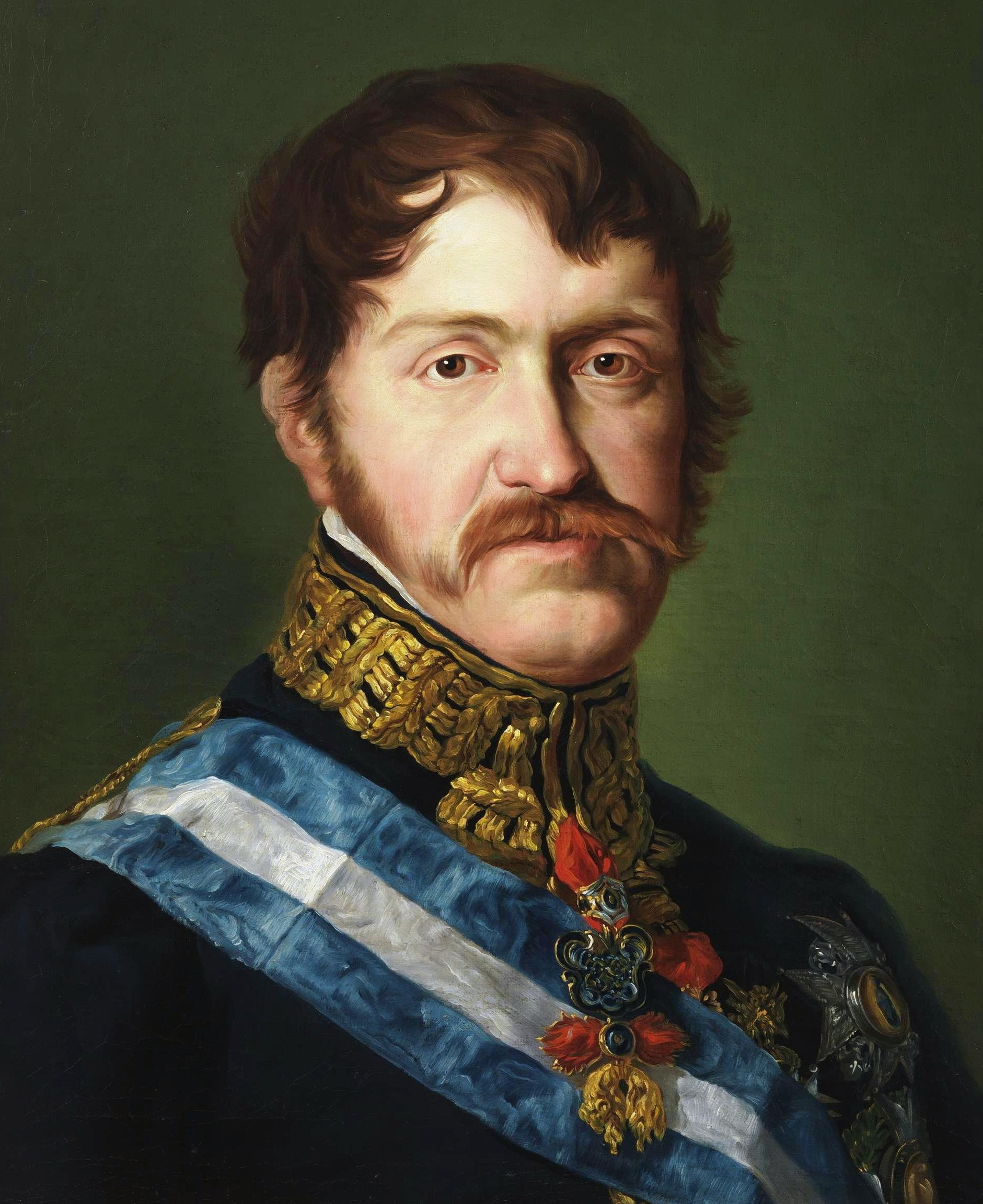
Portrait of Carlos de Borbón by Vicente López Portaña, c. 1823

In 1823, the Spanish Government during the Trienio Liberal had re-instated the Spanish Constitution of 1812, which had abolished the fueros and established a parliamentary monarchy, among other changes. Ferdinand VII repealed it later in the year after he appealed to European powers of the Congress of Vienna in order to restore his absolute powers and France sent a military expedition. The decade that followed the end of the Trienio became known as the Ominous Decade, in which Ferdinand suppressed his enemies, the press, and the institutional reforms of the liberals. He also established a militia called the Voluntarios Realistas ("Royalist Volunteers") which peaked at 284,000 men in 1832 in order to facilitate this suppression, led by an inspector general who answered only to the King himself and funded independently by permanent tax revenues. They were recruited exclusively from conservatives and declared its aim the protection of the royals against liberal attacks.

This decade was plagued by political instability, with a large ultra-conservative revolt breaking out in 1827 and an unsuccessful British-backed liberal pronunciamiento in Pronunciamiento de Torrijos. Ferdinand was unable to control the situation and cycled through ministers, being described by Friedrich von Gentz in 1814: "The king himself enters the houses of his prime ministers, arrests them, and hands them over to their cruel enemies"; and on 14 January 1815: "the king has so debased himself that he has become no more than the leading police agent and prison warden of his country." This assessment seems accurate, as the king described himself as "a cork in a bottle of beer": as soon as that cork was removed, all the troubles of Spain would explode into the open. In addition, as part of his police state Ferdinand revived the Inquisition and expanded it to have "agents in every single village in the realm".

The divide between liberals and conservatives, both unhappy with Ferdinand's reign, was further strengthened by his publication in March 1830 of the Pragmatic Sanction, which replaced the Salic system with a mixed succession system that would allow his daughters to inherit the throne (he had no male heir). This replaced his brother Charles as next-in-succession with his first daughter Isabella, who would be born later that year in October. It was at this point that the Royalist Volunteers and police, which had become politicized towards conservatism, threatened Ferdinand's court that they might support Carlos instead of his heir. Ferdinand died a month before Isabella's third birthday (his reign is considered one of the worst in Spanish history) and so the kingdom came under a regency led at first by Isabella's mother Maria Christina of the Two Sicilies.

The strong absolutist party feared that the regent Maria Christina would make liberal reforms. This was due to her having been chosen as Ferdinand's third wife owing to the influence of liberal faction of his court, led by Princess Luisa Carlotta of the Two Sicilies, the wife of Ferdinand's youngest brother Francisco and court rival of Infanta Maria Francisca of Portugal, wife of Carlos. The absolutists therefore sought another candidate for the throne. For them, the natural choice, based on Salic law, was Ferdinand's brother Carlos. The differing views on the influence of the army and the Church in governance, as well as the forthcoming administrative reforms paved the way for the expulsion of the Conservatives from the higher governmental circles. At the same time, moderate royalists and constitutionalist liberals coalesced around their support of the Pragmatic Sanction and against Carlos.

As written by one historian:

The first Carlist war was fought not so much on the basis of the legal claim of Don Carlos, but because a passionate, dedicated section of the Spanish people favored a return to a kind of absolute monarchy that they felt would protect their individual freedoms (fueros), their regional individuality and their religious conservatism.

This opportunistic view of Carlism is further supported by the fact that "Carlism" was first mentioned in official correspondence in 1824, both after the restoration of absolutism to Spain by the French expedition and more than 35 years after the 1789 succession discussions which Ferdinand ratified in his Sanction.

==== Crisis of 1832 ====
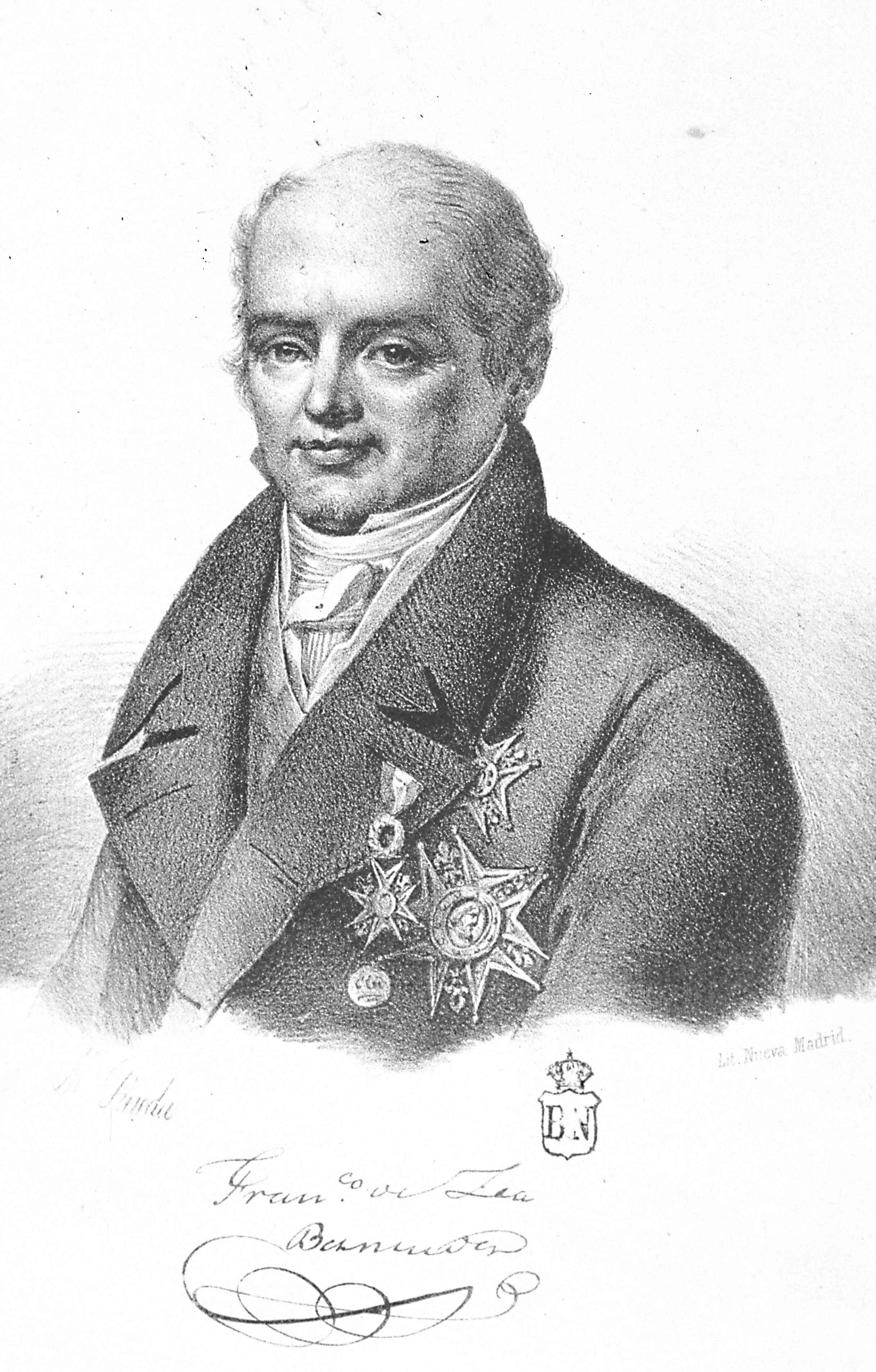
Francisco Cea Bermudez, an important official during the Trienio Liberal, presided over the 1832–1834 cabinet

By September 1832, it was clear that King Ferdinand would soon die. To avert a civil war, Maria Christina sent Antonio de Saavedra y Jofré to ask Carlos to serve as principal advisor during the regency and arrange a marriage between Isabella and Carlos' son Carlos Luis. Carlos refused on religious grounds. He warned her that God would punish him in the afterlife for giving away a throne that was rightfully his. (Note: "I have no ambition to become king. On the contrary, I should like to free myself from such a heavy burden, which I recognize as far greater than my strength. But God who has placed me in this position will guide me in this vale of tears. Not my own strength but his will permits me to carry out such an arduous task. [...] I know very well that if I were to cede this crown to someone who has no right to it, God would ask a strict account of me in the next world, and my confessor in this world would not pardon me for it. [...] I do not want a civil war. You are the one who wants it since you insist on upholding a just cause.") On 18 September, at the urging of Maria Christina who was outnumbered in Court by Carlists, Ferdinand revoked the Pragmatic Sanction. Soon afterwards, however, he regained his health and was no longer in immediate danger of dying (though by that point rumours had been widely published abroad that he had died). This episode spurred the liberals to enact extensive personnel changes in the government, army, bureaucracy, police, and Royalist Volunteers in order to drive out the royalists who had been so close to realizing Carlos's claim to the throne. For example, in one dispatch the captain-general of Extremadura proposed the removal of 12 governors, king's lieutenants, and garrison adjutants; 1 colonel; 5 field officers of the Royalist Volunteers; 3 employees of the military treasury; 5 employees of the captain-general's office; the former chief of police; 7 employees of the treasury office; 1 artillery captain; and 3 post office employees.

Cea Bermudez's centrist government (1 October 1832 – January 1834) inaugurated the return to Spain of many exiles from London and Paris, e.g. Juan Álvarez Mendizabal (born Méndez). The rise of Cea Bermudez was followed by a closer collaboration and understanding with Spain's debtors, who in turn clearly encouraged the former's reforms and liberalization, i.e. the new liberal regime and the incorporation of Spain to the European financial system. After its formation, Maria Isabella published a manifesto threatening those that would seek any change in the government system (namely, "pure unadulterated monarchy under [...] King Ferdinand VII"). (Note: "the sword already lifted up will fall on the neck of all conspirators and their accomplices who, forgetting their true nature, might dare to acclaim or seduce the reckless to acclaim any type of government other than pure unadulterated monarchy under the gentle aegis of its legitimate Sovereign, the very high, very sublime, very powerful King Ferdinand VII my August Spouse, just as he inherited it from his ancestors.") Coverdale suggests this manifesto was inspired by Bermudez's philosophy of enlightened despotism. Nonetheless, the political situation in Spain was too fragmented for a moderate government like Bermudez's to gain and maintain public support and most of its activity was restrained to controlling potential rebellions from both the Carlists and the liberals.

On 6 October, Ferdinand named Maria Cristina interim governor and allowed her to publish decrees in his name on both urgent and day-to-day affairs. She quickly re-opened the universities (which had been closed as centers of liberal agitation) and removed many captains-generals and garrison town military commanders as well as General Nazario Eguía from their positions. These included Vicente González Moreno, José O'Donnell, and Santos Ladrón de Cegama, all of whom would later join the Carlists in the civil war. Additionally, the Queen suppressed the tax raised to fund the Royalist Volunteers (which were directly collected by them) and removed the political requirements for joining them.

On 15 October, Maria Cristina issued a political amnesty for many exiles and liberals (except for those that had voted in favor of the King's removal and those that had led armed forces against him). A few weeks later, these former political criminals became eligible to hold office again and consequently the liberals mobilized around the Queen.

== Basque Carlism and the fueros ==
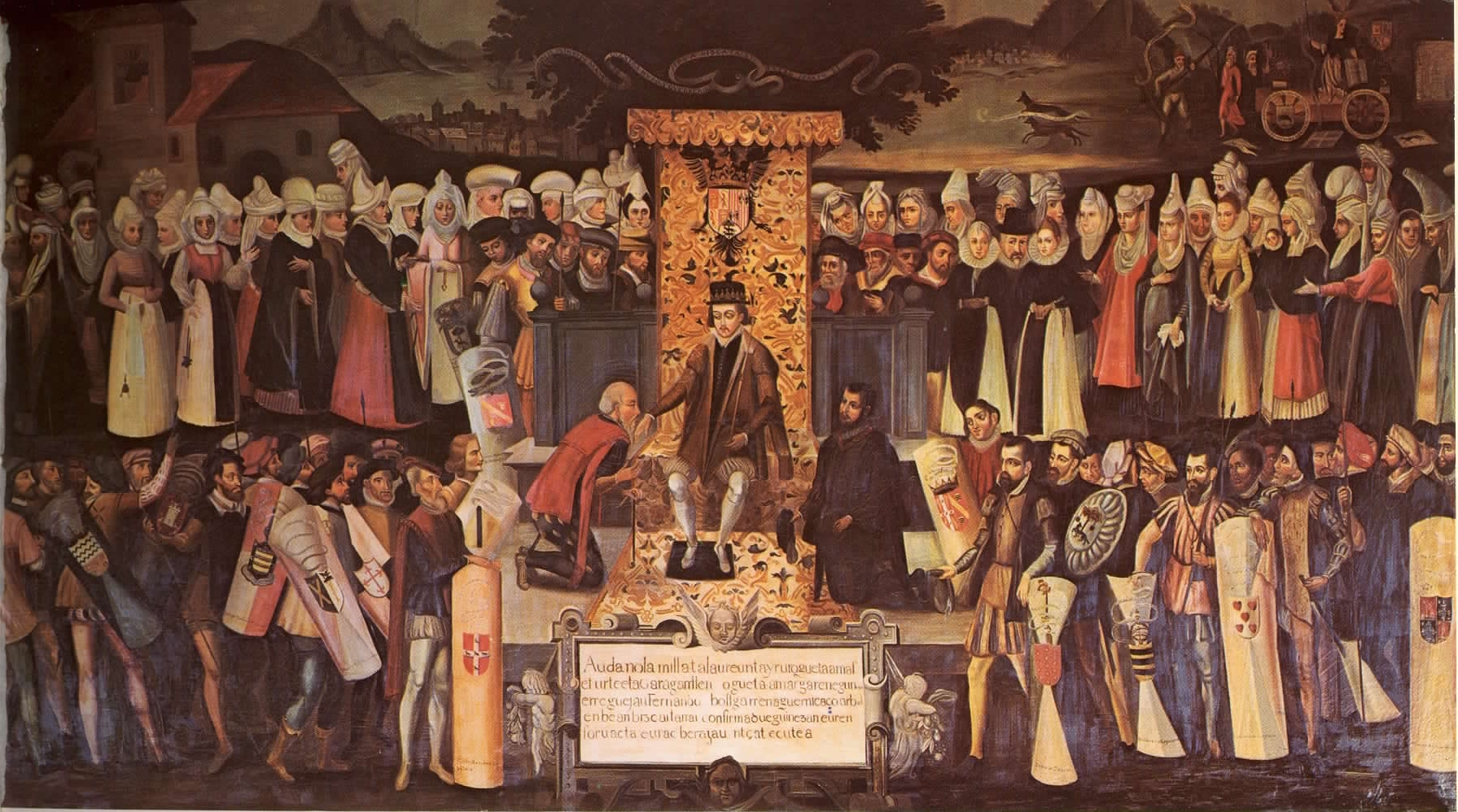
Ferdinand the Catholic confirming the fueros of Biscay at Guernica in 1476

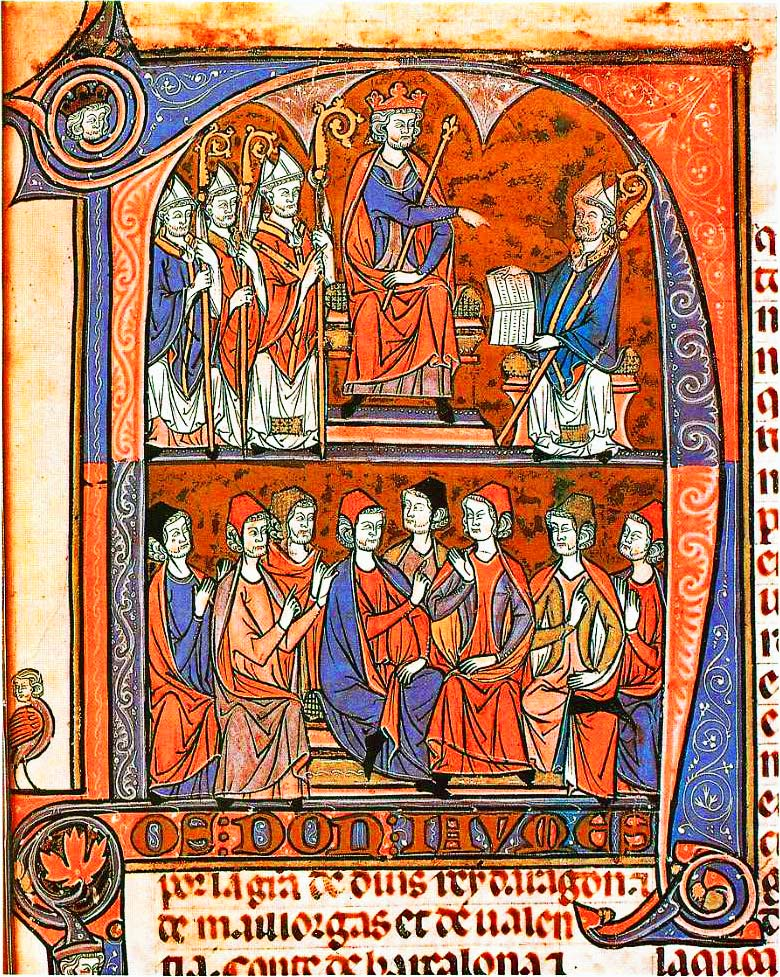
King James I of Aragon receives from Vidal de Canyelles, Bishop of Huesca, the first compilation of the Furs d'Aragó (the "Fueros of Aragon"), 1247

Historically, the loyalty of the Basque regions to the kings of Spain and, until the French Revolution, France depended on their upholding of traditional laws, customs, and special privileges. Their representative assemblies go back to the Middle Ages, yet their privileges had been consistently and progressively devalued by both monarchies. While the fueros that formerly made up the Crown of Aragon and included Catalonia, Aragon, Valencia, and the Balearic Islands had been abolished in the Nueva Planta decrees of 1717, the Basques managed to maintain a relative autonomy to the rest of the Spanish Kingdom in thanks to their support of Philip V of Spain in the War of the Spanish Succession.

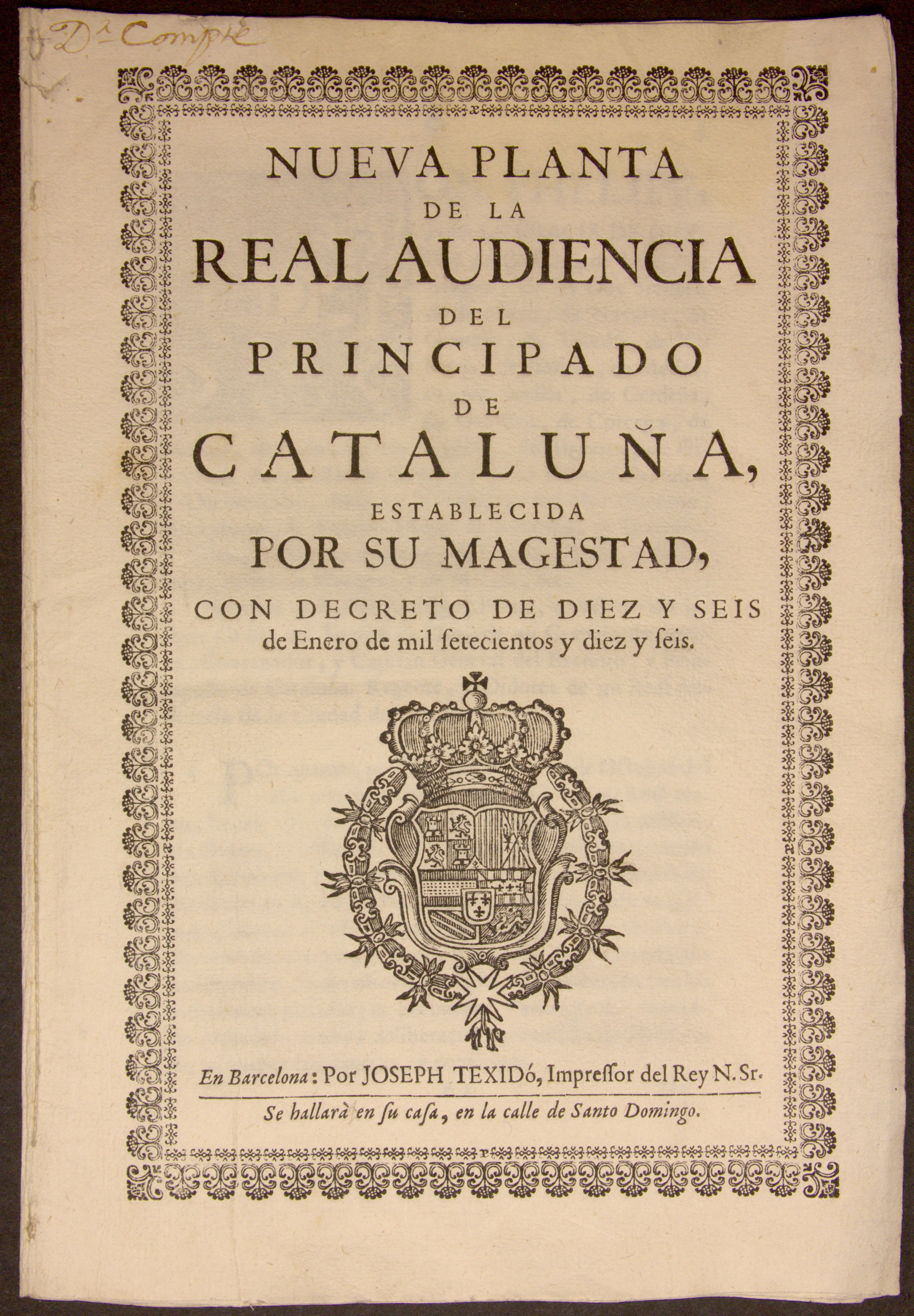
Cover of the Nueva Planta decrees of Catalonia

The centralisers in the Spanish government supported some of the great powers against Basque merchants from at least since the time of the abolition of the Jesuit order and the Godoy regime. First they sided with the French Bourbons to suppress the Jesuits, following the formidable changes in North America after the victory of the United States in the American Revolutionary War. Then Godoy sided with the British against the Basques in the War of the Pyrenees of 1793, and immediately afterwards with the French of Napoleon, also against the Basques. The British interest was to destroy, for as long as possible, Spanish commercial routes and power, which were mainly sustained by the Basque ports and merchant fleet.

The Constitution of 1812 was written without Basque input, but they agreed to it due to the ongoing war against the French. As one example, the 1812 Constitution was signed by Gipuzkoan representatives under the watch of a sword-wielding general Castaños, and tellingly the San Sebastián council representatives took the oath to the 1812 Constitution with the smell of smoke still wafting and surrounded by rubble. This Constitution abolished Basque home rule, and in the following years the contrafueros (literally "against fueros") removed provisions such as fiscal sovereignty and specificity of military draft. The resentment against the growing intervention of Madrid (e.g. attempts to take over Biscayan mines in 1826) and the loss of autonomy was considerably strong.

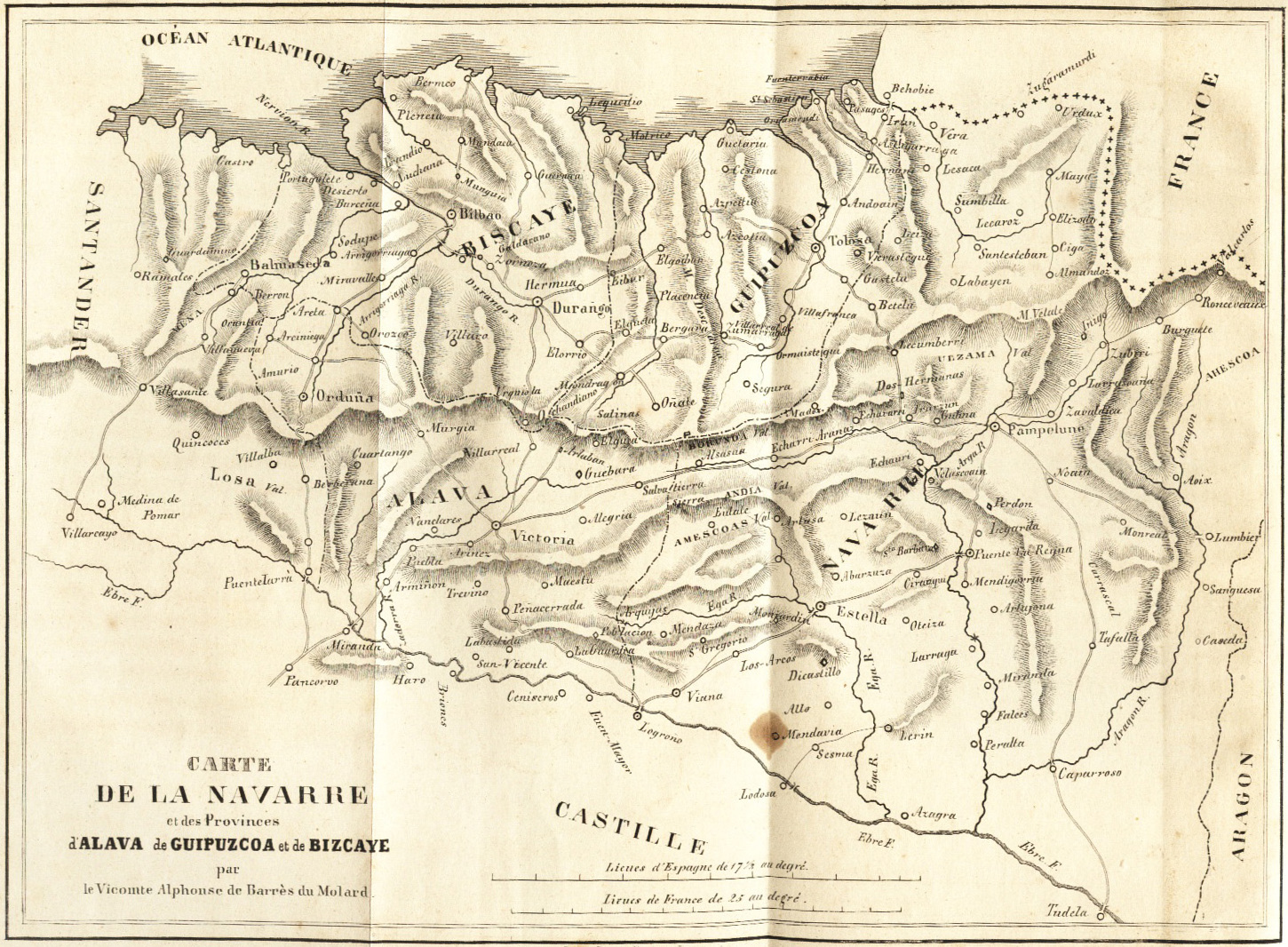
The Basque districts during the First Carlist War period

However, King Ferdinand VII found an important support base in the Basque Country. The 1812 Constitution of Cádiz had suppressed Basque home rule, and was couched in terms of a unified Spanish nation which rejected the existence of the Basque nation, so the new Spanish king garnered the endorsement of the Basques as long as he respected the Basque institutional and legal framework.

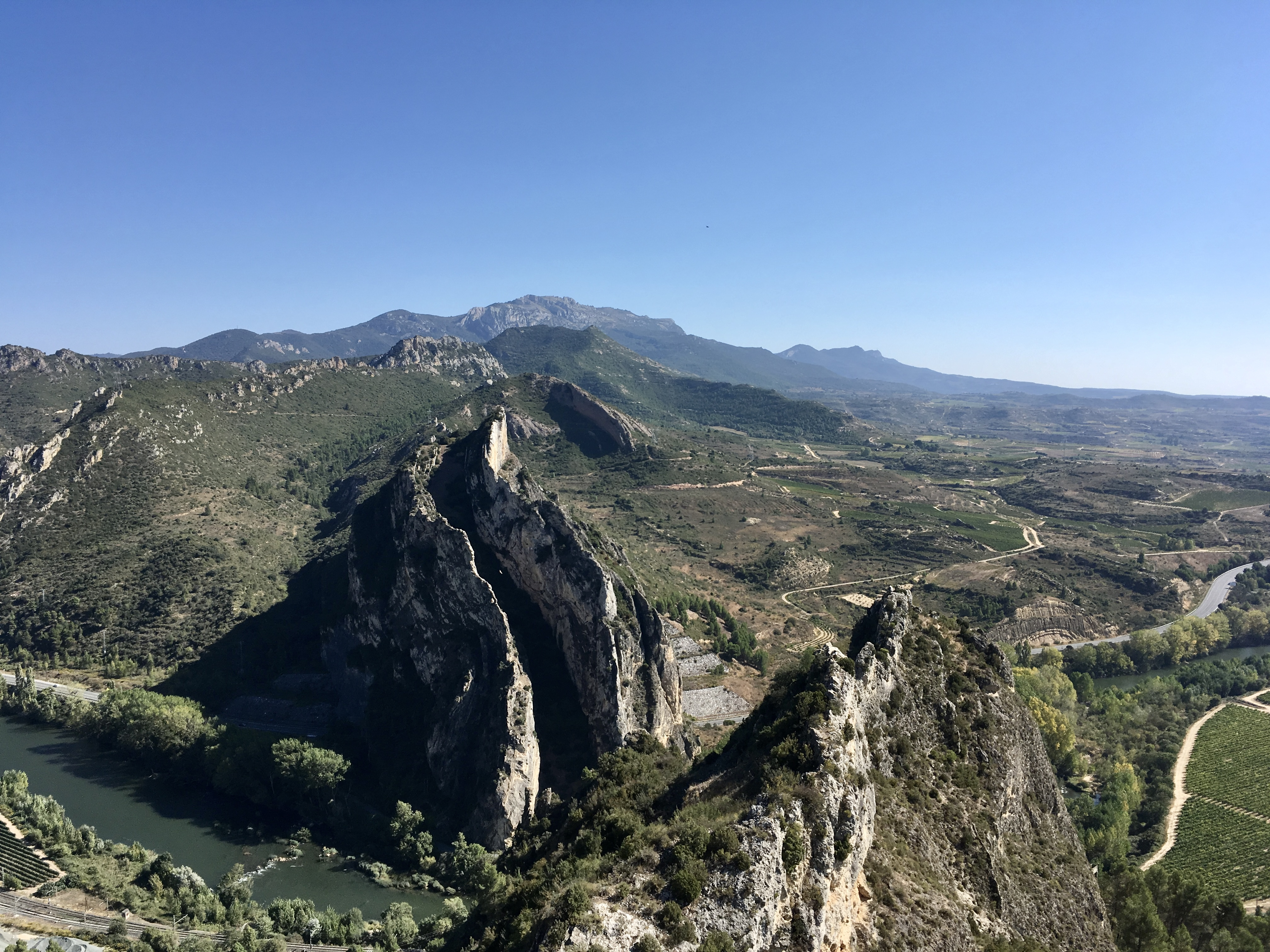
The conchas of Haro, where the Ebro passes into La Rioja forming the border with the Basque country

Most foreign observers, including Charles F. Henningsen, Michael B. Honan, or Edward B. Stephens, English writers and first-hand witnesses of the First Carlist War, who had spent time in the Basque districts, were highly sympathetic to the Carlists, which they regarded as representing the cause of Basque home rule. A notable exception was John Francis Bacon, a diplomat residing in Bilbao during the Carlist siege of (1835), who, while praising Basque governance, could not hide his hostility towards the Carlists, whom he regarded as "savages." He went on to contest his compatriots' approach, denied a connection between the Carlist cause and the defense of the Basque liberties, and speculated that Carlos V would be quick to erode or suppress them if he took the Spanish throne.

The privileges of the Basque provinces are odious to the Spanish nation, of which Charles is so well aware, that if he was king of Spain next year, he would quickly find excuses for infringing them, if not their total abolition. A representative government will endeavour to raise Spain to a level with the Basque provinces, – a despot, to whom the very name of freedom is odious, would strive to reduce the provinces to the same low level with the rest.

Modern historian Mark Lawrence agrees:

The Pretender's foralism was not proactive but purely in reaction to the fact that the rest of Spain (which had long been stripped of its fueros) had failed to rally to his cause. He was forced to rely on the fueros because no other wing of the Fernandine state, neither the army nor (mostly) the Church, defected to the Carlist cause. In fact, the fueros grew in importance only when military victory seemed impossible in the wake of the failed Royal Expedition, and as Carlist peace feelers voiced a growing willingness to abandon Don Carlos who, since 1834, had been the fueros’ champion.

and further notes that "the powers of the fueros themselves were increasingly curtailed by the Carlist Royal Government in the name of the war effort."

The interests of the Basque liberals were divided. On the one side, fluent cross-Pyrenean trade with other Basque districts and France was highly valued, as well as unrestricted overseas transactions. The former had been strong up to the French Revolution, especially in Navarre, but the new French national arrangement (1790) had abolished the separate legal and fiscal status of the French Basque districts. Despite difficulties, on-off trade continued during the period of uncertainty prevailing under the French Convention, the War of the Pyrenees (1793-1795), Manuel Godoy's tenure in office, and the Peninsular War. Eventually, Napoleonic defeat left cross-border commercial activity struggling to take off after 1813.

Overseas commerce was badly affected by the end of the Guipuzcoan Company of Caracas (1785), the French-Spanish defeat at the Battle of Trafalgar (1805), independence movements in Latin America (started 1808), the destruction of San Sebastián (1813), and the eventual breakup of the Royal Philippine Company (1814). By 1826 all the grand Spanish (including the Basque) fleet of the late 18th century with its renowned Basque navigators was gone, and with it, the Atlantic vocation of the Enlightened Spain.

Notwithstanding the ideology of Basque liberals, overall supportive of home rule, the Basques and their industries were getting choked by the above circumstances and customs on the Ebro, on account of the high levies enforced on them by the successive Spanish governments after 1776. Many Basque merchants advocated in turn for the relocation of the Ebro customs to the Pyrenees, and the encouragement of a Spanish market. However, a majority of Basque consumers benefited from their ability to buy foreign goods without paying Spanish tariffs and participation in the contraband trade.

On Ferdinand VII's death in 1833, the minor Isabella II was proclaimed queen, with Maria Christina acting as regent. In November, a new Spanish institutional arrangement was designed by the incoming government in Madrid, homogenising Spanish administration according to provinces and conspicuously overruling Basque institutions.

The early attempts of the Viceroy of Navarra to recruit villagers into Cristino ranks failed miserably, even when service wages were offered of double, then treble, what the Carlist insurgents promised. Coverdale summarised four factors as to why this was so: (1) traditional society was still economically viable for most of population, hence liberalism was seen a threat; (2) natural leadership strata (clergy, landowners) lived cheek by jowl with peasants and supported the Carlist cause; (3) the terrain was sufficiently abrupt and broken to prevent the use of cavalry and to facilitate small bands to escape (to change their shirts and fight another day), whilst the landscape was densely populated enough to allow regular food and supplies; and (4) the appearance of the extremely gifted guerrilla leader, Tomás de Zumalacárregui. Other parts of Spain may have had one, or some of these factors, but not all four.

In this context the additional importance of the loss of the colonies arises. The Basques had traditionally emigrated to the New World in order to get better jobs and deal with their rising population in a highly mountainous region which could not support large populations. The end of this option during a period of accelerated population growth meant that the Basque region "faced a bottleneck of impoverished and underemployed men of military age who had little [to] lose by joining Carlist insurrections". Basque support for Carlism was "far more conditional than [historian] traditionalists, neo-traditionalists, and even Liberals believed." As Mark Lawrence writes, "it would be superficial to explain Basque Carlism as a war in defence of the fueros" but also states that "Basque Carlism is also impossible to understand without them, not least because their most outspoken defenders were to be found in Carlist ranks and their most outspoken critics amongst the Cristino Liberals."

== Contenders ==
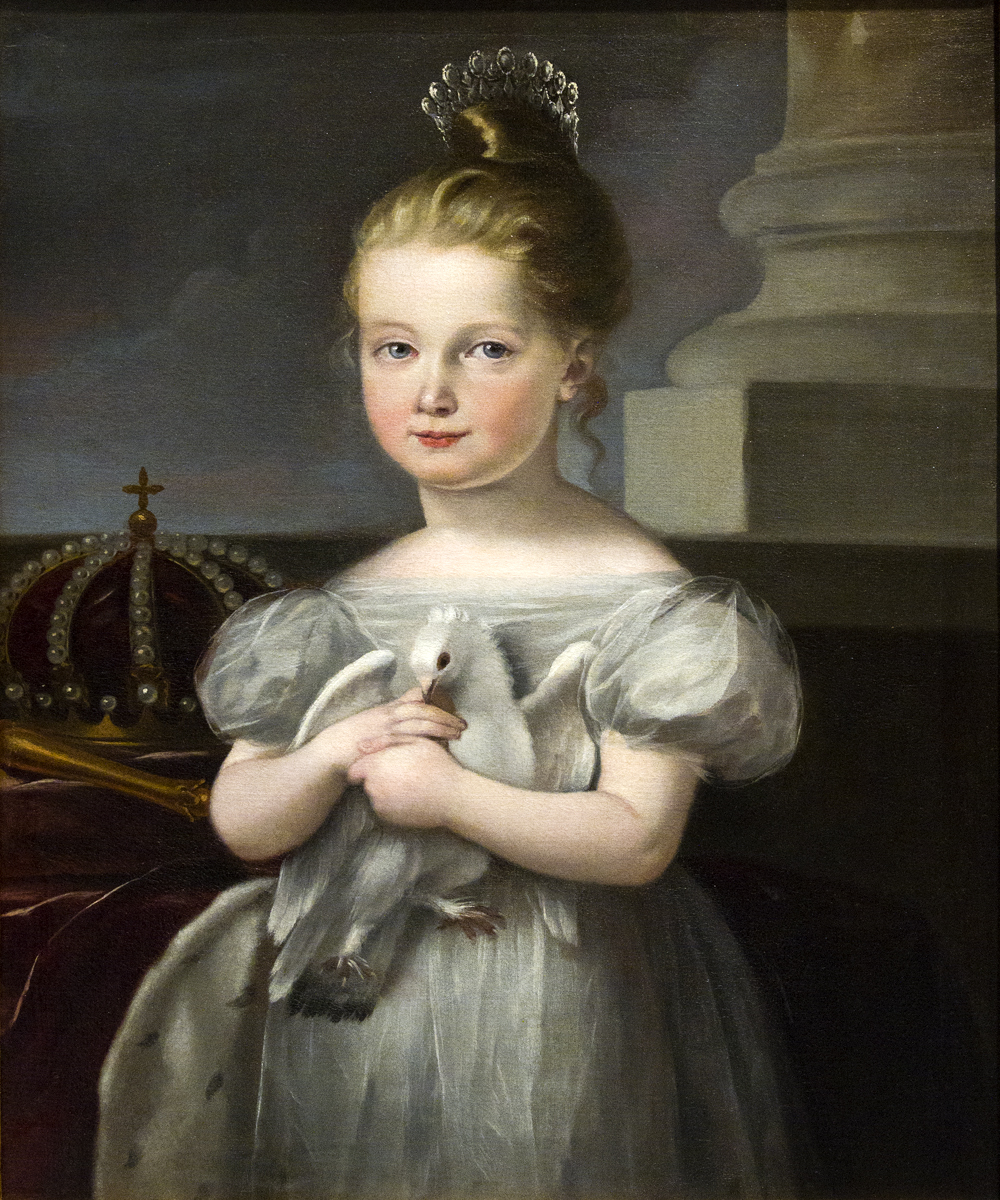
Isabella II, by José de Madrazo

The people of the western Basque provinces (ambiguously called "Biscay" up to that point) and Navarre sided with Carlos because ideologically Carlos was close to them and more importantly because he was willing to uphold Basque institutions and laws. Some historians claim that the Carlist cause in the Basque Country was a pro-fueros cause, but others (Stanley G. Payne) contend that no connection to the emergence of Basque nationalism can be postulated. Many supporters of the Carlists cause believed a traditionalist rule would better respect the ancient region specific institutions and laws established under historical rights. Navarre and the rest of the Basque provinces held their customs on the Ebro river. Trade had been strong with France (especially in Navarre) and overseas up to the Peninsular War (up to 1813), but getting sluggish thereafter.

Another important reason for the massive mobilisation of the western Basque provinces and Navarre for the Carlist cause was the tremendous influence of the Basque clergy whose number per capita was double that of other regions. Basque clergy still addressed the public in their own language, Basque, unlike school and administration, institutions where Spanish had been imposed by then. The Basque pro-fueros liberal class under the influence of the Enlightenment and ready for independence from Spain (and initially at least allegiance to France) was put down by the Spanish authorities at the end of the War of the Pyrenees (San Sebastián, Pamplona, etc.). As of then, the strongest partisans of the region specific laws were the rural based clergy, nobility and lower class—opposing new liberal ideas largely imported from France. Salvador de Madariaga, in his book Memories of a Federalist (Buenos Aires, 1967), accused the Basque clergy of being "the heart, the brain and the root of the intolerance and the hard line" of the Spanish Catholic Church.

On the other side, the liberals and moderates united to defend the new order represented by María Cristina and her three-year-old daughter, Isabella. They controlled the institutions, almost the whole army, and the cities; the Carlist movement was stronger in rural areas. The liberals had the crucial support of United Kingdom, France and Portugal, support that was shown in the important credits to Cristina's treasury and the military help from the British (British Legion or Westminster Legion under General de Lacy Evans), the French (the French Foreign Legion), and the Portuguese (a Regular Army Division under General Count of Antas). The Liberals were strong enough to win the war in two months, but an inefficient government and the dispersion of the Carlist forces gave Carlos time to consolidate his forces and hold out for almost seven years in the northern and eastern provinces.

As Paul Johnson has written, "both royalists and liberals began to develop strong local followings, which were to perpetuate and transmute themselves, through many open commotions and deceptively tranquil intervals, until they exploded in the merciless civil war of 1936-39."

== Combatants ==
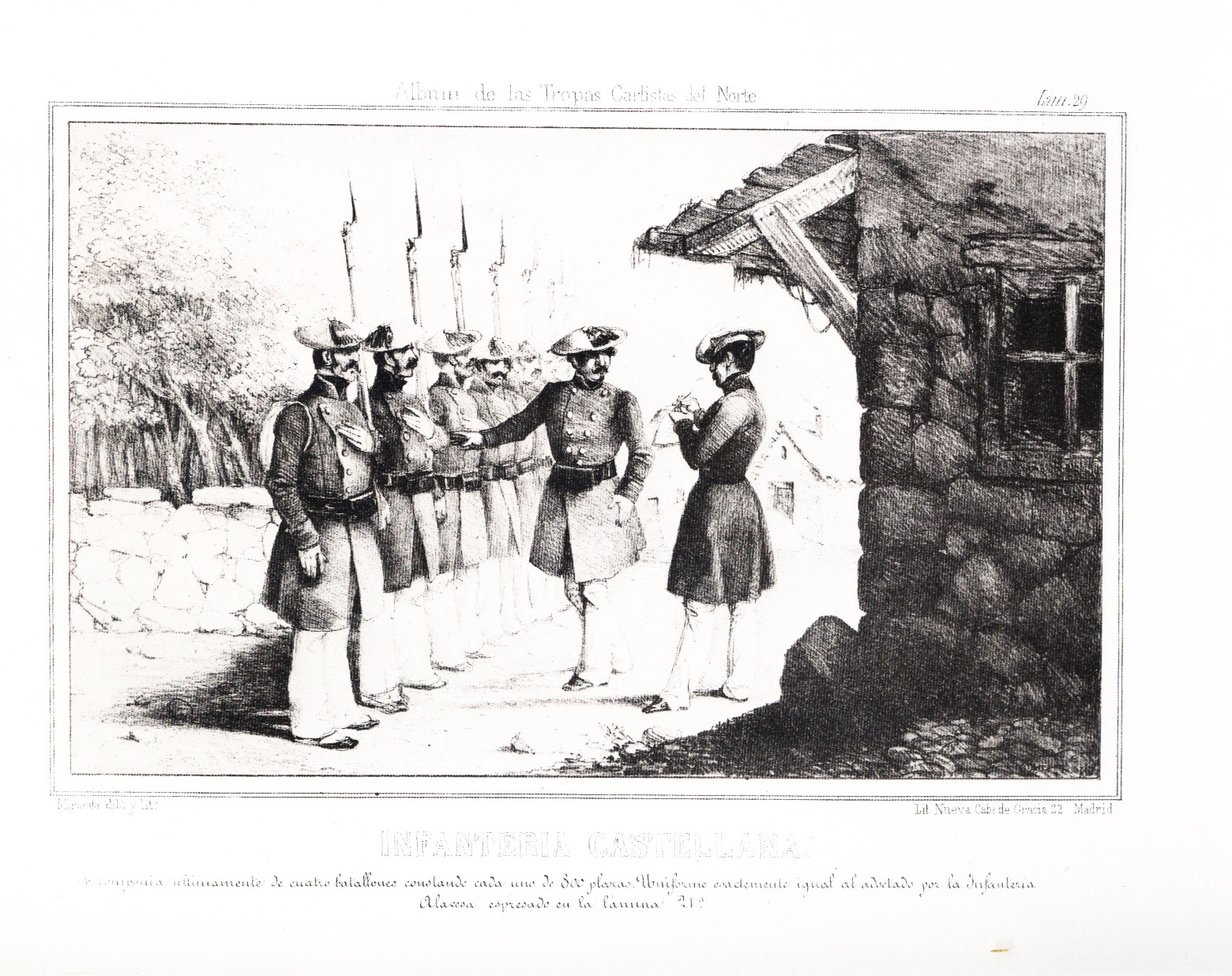
Carlist forces

Both sides raised special troops during the war. The Liberal side formed the volunteer Basque units known as the Chapelgorris, while Tomás de Zumalacárregui created the special units known as aduaneros. Zumalacárregui also established the unit known as Guías de Navarra from Liberal troops from La Mancha, Valencia, Andalusia and other places who had been taken prisoner at the Battle of Alsasua (1834). After this battle, they had been faced with the choice of joining the Carlist troops or being executed.

The term Requetés was at first applied to just the Tercer Batallón de Navarra (Third Battalion of Navarre) and subsequently to all Carlist combatants.

The war attracted independent adventurers, such as the Briton C. F. Henningsen, who served as Zumalacárregui's chief bodyguard (and later was his biographer), and Martín Zurbano, a contrabandista or smuggler, who:

soon after the commencement of the war sought and obtained permission to raise a body of men to act in conjunction with the queen's troops against the Carlists. His standard, once displayed, was resorted to by smugglers, robbers, and outcasts of all descriptions, attracted by the prospect of plunder and adventure. These were increased by deserters...

About 250 foreign volunteers fought for the Carlists; the majority were French monarchists, but they were joined by men from Portugal, Britain, Belgium, Piedmont-Sardinia, and the German states. Friedrich, Prince of Schwarzenberg fought for the Carlists, and had taken part in the French conquest of Algeria and the Swiss civil war of the Sonderbund. The Carlists' ranks included such men as Prince Felix Lichnowsky, Adolfo Loning, Baron Wilhelm Von Radhen and August Karl von Goeben, all of whom later wrote memoirs concerning the war.

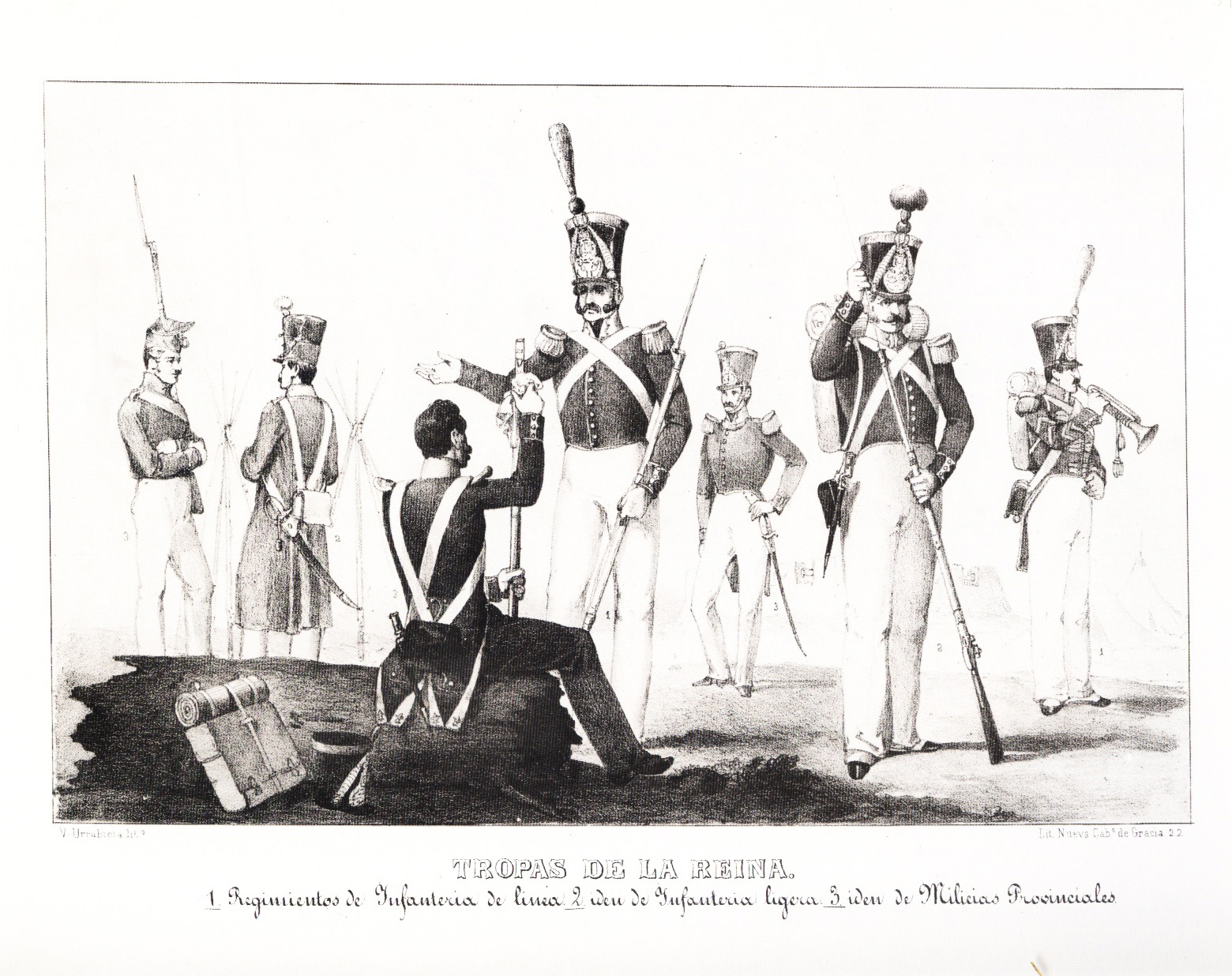
Liberal forces

The Liberal generals, such as Vicente Genaro de Quesada and Marcelino de Oraá Lecumberri, were often veterans of the Peninsular War, or of the wars resulting from independence movements in South America. For instance, Jerónimo Valdés participated in the battle of Ayacucho (1824).

Both sides executed prisoners of war by firing squad; the most notorious incident occurred at Heredia, when 118 Liberal prisoners were executed by order of Zumalacárregui. The British attempted to intervene, and through Lord Eliot, the Lord Eliot Convention was signed on April 27–28, 1835.

The treatment of prisoners of the First Carlist War became regulated and had positive effects. A soldier of the British Auxiliary Legion wrote:

The British and Chapelgorris who fell into their hands [the Carlists], were mercilessly put to death, sometimes by means of tortures worthy of the North American Indians; but the Spanish troops of the line were saved by virtue, I believe, of the Eliot treaty, and after being kept for some time in prison, where they were treated with sufficient harshness, were frequently exchanged for an equal number of prisoners made by the Christinos.

However, Henry Bill, another contemporary, wrote that, although "it was mutually agreed upon to treat the prisoners taken on either side according to the ordinary rules of war, a few months only elapsed before similar barbarities were practiced with all their former remorselessness."

== The contenders ==
=== Carlos, the Church, and the nobility ===
Zones under Carlist military control (dark orange) and areas where they found popular support (light orange)

Carlos had refused to openly challenge either the Pragmatic Sanction nor his brother while the latter remained alive, as the "recent legitimist rising knowns as the Agraviados had taught him the wisdom of awaiting events." This may be due to nineteenth century Spain being highly politically unstable through endless pronunciamientos. His allies in the courts and important positions of the Spanish state had been purged by the liberals towards the last months of Ferdinand's life, weakening various centers of Carlist strength. Few private citizens, however, were persecuted for their political opinions during this time.

In order to strengthen public support, the Carlist created significant amounts of propaganda, both during the war and in the years leading up to it. Carlos's refusal to swear an oath to Isabel in a letter to his brother (Note: "My conscience and my honor forbid me to do so. My rights to the crown, in the case I outlive you and you leave no male heir, are so legitimate that I cannot [prescind] from them.[sic] They are rights that God gave me, when it was his will that I should be born. Only God can take them away from me by giving you a male child, which is something I greatly desire, perhaps even more than you do.") was widely published, as well as a supposed response from universities about Carlos's right to the throne and two articles published in French periodicals that also focused on the judicial right of Carlos to the throne. The pamphlets and manifestos are divided into two types: the first includes legal arguments for why Don Carlos was the sole rightful heir to the Spanish throne while the second was composed by political arguments that were often laden with heavily religious overtones.

Most of these propagandist pamphlets published before the war were printed in France by Carlist exiles who then smuggled them into Spain, and so were most widely distributed in the northern regions of the Basque Country, Navarre, Aragon, and Catalonia.

Carlos found allies in the same areas that resisted the Liberals near the end of the Trienio: primarily in upland Navarra and the Basque provinces but also in inland Catalonia, Aragon, Galicia, and Old Castille. One historian called the minor civil war between Liberals and royalists in 1823 "a geographic dress rehearsal for the Carlist War".

Nonetheless, support for Carlos was not politically uniform. Basque Carlism was socially conservative and supported their stable rural economy, whereas in the Maestrazgo and Catalonia it was more of a protest vehicle for peasants against the negative effects of urbanization and new Liberal property regulations (Note: Particularly, the sale of town-owned land that was often farmed collectively, or used by all local landowners to gather firewood and pasture their animals. See Coverdale's The Basque Phase of Spain's First Carlist War in the reflist.) were having on their livelihood. Such regulations were threatening to abolish the de facto rights to use-ownership of land by peasants and move towards a more contract and cash-based system.

In addition, Carlism did not represent a rural fight against urban development, as "[urban] artisans threatened by recurrent Liberal abolition of the guilds and redundant officeholders (cesantes) could be drawn to Carlism, whilst, by contrast, villagers who had benefited from the Liberal property revolution would correspondingly turn Cristino; flight either from or to the countryside in many cases entrenched a rural (Carlist) versus urban (Cristino) divide, but as an effect rather than a cause of the conflict."

It is highly likely that there were nobles outside of the three Carlist "heartlands" that were in favour of his cause, but any public show of support would have resulted in the Cristino court banishing those nobles from Madrid and seizing their extensive lands and income. Northern nobles, simply speaking, had much less land to lose. Carlism in Cristino areas can be differentiated into civic and faccioso (insurgent) Carlists. The latter were often bandits looking for political cover, while civic Carlists were subject to progressively harsher treatment as the war radicalized Spanish politics.

Overall, the Carlist position can be summarized as a radical reactionary policy to restore the privileges of the church and nobles, decentralise legislative and judicial powers, and bring the monarchy to a more medieval role that was less absolutist and more dependent on nobles. "In other words, the Carlists wanted to revise not just the recent Liberal revolution but the entire eighteenth-century legacy of enlightened absolutism."

=== Maria Christina, the great powers, and the liberal government ===
On the other side, the liberals and moderates united to defend the new order represented by María Cristina and her three-year-old daughter, Isabella. They controlled the institutions, almost the whole army, and the cities; the Carlist movement was stronger in rural areas. The liberals had the crucial support of United Kingdom, France and Portugal, support that was shown in the important credits to Cristina's treasury and the military help from the British (British Legion or Westminster Legion under General de Lacy Evans), the French (the French Foreign Legion), and the Portuguese (a Regular Army Division, under General Count of Antas).

==== Military ====
The liberals were just as multi-faceted as the Carlists, carrying on the factionalism that had characterized them during the Peninsular War. They disagreed in regards to military, with the guerilleros (patriot guerilla bands), the Bourbon army, and the National militia (a part-time citizen's force organized at a local level and "in the hands of property owners" which was written into the Constitution yet saw only "ephemeral" involvement at the end of the Napoleonic war) all favored by different politicians and at different times both before and during the war. The national militia was championed by the Liberals during the Trienio, but required a literacy test and ability to afford the uniform from those enlisted. However, they received the same privileges and immunity as the military while having as only requirement the condition of "when active in their duties" which led to significant in-fighting and an "extra-paramilitary double regime" during the Trienio.

The growing anti-militarist sentiment amongst the liberals resulted in the emergence in the Napoleonic War amongst the army of a faction that "was hostile to the whole constitutional experiment" due to the "shabby treatment" received from politicians. Conditions were not significantly better during the Ferdinandine reign, as soldiers faced late payments and inadequate rations and its Liberal officers placed on half-pay or remote garrisons by the distrustful king (many of these officers later led Rafael del Riego's pronunciamiento).< Note also that conscripts had no a priori reason to be committed to the Cristino cause, while officers had a career they were willing to sacrifice their men and military considerations for.

The Liberal generals, such as Vicente Genaro de Quesada and Marcelino de Oraá Lecumberri, were often veterans of the Peninsular War, or of the wars resulting from independence movements in South America. For instance, Jerónimo Valdés participated in the battle of Ayacucho (1824).

== Army organization ==
=== Special troops and foreign volunteers ===
Both sides raised special troops during the war. The Liberal side formed the volunteer Basque units known as the Chapelgorris, while Tomás de Zumalacárregui created the special units known as aduaneros. Zumalacárregui also established the unit known as Guías de Navarra from Liberal troops from La Mancha, Valencia, Andalusia and other places who had been taken prisoner at the Battle of Alsasua (1834). After this battle, they had been faced with the choice of joining the Carlist troops or being executed.

The term Requetés was at first applied to just the Tercer Batallón de Navarra (Third Battalion of Navarre) and subsequently to all Carlist combatants.

The war attracted independent adventurers, such as the Briton C. F. Henningsen, who served as Zumalacárregui's chief bodyguard (and later was his biographer), and Martín Zurbano, a contrabandista or smuggler, who:

soon after the commencement of the war sought and obtained permission to raise a body of men to act in conjunction with the queen's troops against the Carlists. His standard, once displayed, was resorted to by smugglers, robbers, and outcasts of all descriptions, attracted by the prospect of plunder and adventure. These were increased by deserters...

About 250 foreign volunteers fought for the Carlists; the majority were French monarchists, but they were joined by men from Portugal, Britain, Belgium, Piedmont, and the German states. Friedrich, Prince of Schwarzenberg fought for the Carlists, and had taken part in the French conquest of Algeria and the Swiss civil war of the Sonderbund. The Carlists' ranks included such men as Prince Felix Lichnowsky, Adolfo Loning, Baron Wilhelm Von Radhen and August Karl von Goeben, all of whom later wrote memoirs concerning the war.

=== Treatment of prisoners ===
Both sides executed prisoners of war by firing squad; the most notorious incident occurred at Heredia, when 118 Liberal prisoners were executed by order of Zumalacárregui. The British attempted to intervene, and through Lord Eliot, the Lord Eliot Convention was signed on April 27–28, 1835.

The treatment of prisoners of the First Carlist War in the Basque region became regulated and had temporary positive effects. A soldier of the British Auxiliary Legion wrote:

The British and Chapelgorris who fell into their hands [the Carlists], were mercilessly put to death, sometimes by means of tortures worthy of the North American Indians; but the Spanish troops of the line were saved by virtue, I believe, of the Eliot treaty, and after being kept for some time in prison, where they were treated with sufficient harshness, were frequently exchanged for an equal number of prisoners made by the Christinos.

However, Henry Bill, another contemporary, wrote that, although "it was mutually agreed upon to treat the prisoners taken on either side according to the ordinary rules of war, a few months only elapsed before similar barbarities were practiced with all their former remorselessness." Importantly, the agreement never went into effect outside of the Basque area.

Both sides did not hesitate to execute civilians related to soldiers on the opposing side, such as in the case of Carlist general Cabrera's mother.

Prisoners would often be made to fight for their captors, with the only alternative being execution. They also served as military labor, such as in the construction of siege trains.

Prisoners also were the worst sufferers of the long forced marches that were common in the conflict. Most died of hunger or disease in the few months after being captured and were forced to scavenge for food, resorting first to unripe root crops and eventually to cannibalism. For example, during the Royal Expedition Cabrera executed a number of Cristino cannibals that were caught during the act but the prisoners could not even stand up to receive the bullets. Thankfully after some months the surviving prisoners of the expedition were exchanged between sides.

== Logistics ==
=== Army conditions ===
Armies on both sides had difficulties securing food and medical treatment for their troops. The food situation was so bad that Wilhelm von Radhen wrote of Carlos subsisting on "a pan of fried potatoes a day".

Many wounded would be left for dead on the battlefield or taken to dirty field hospitals with high mortality rates. For example, 3/4 of the wounded Liberals in the Morella campaign died within days. Wounded soldiers, depending on the source, account for 11.1-37% of combat fatalities. However, it is hard to estimate exactly how many soldiers died due to army conditions as contemporary sources often had partisan agendas and distorted figures.

=== Use of Intelligence ===
Carlist forces had significantly superior access to and quality of information due to their support in the regions where the conflict was fought. This allowed them to develop internal lines of communication, which were then used to devastating effect by Carlist generals. As reported by British Ambassador George Villiers, they would use spy networks and flash telegrammes to gather and communicate information. Cristino armies were often forced to use the valleys when travelling in the front lines, while Carlists were able to use hillpaths to transport troops and supplies using mule trains. Cabrera was specially known for diversions, such as driving herds of cattle to leave false footprints or luring enemies by creating false exposed flanks.

=== Defenses ===
While permanent fortresses placed in vantage points and equipped with artillery were used, guerilla patrols and armed farmers often served to control remote hilltops and roads between villages and cities.

== War ==
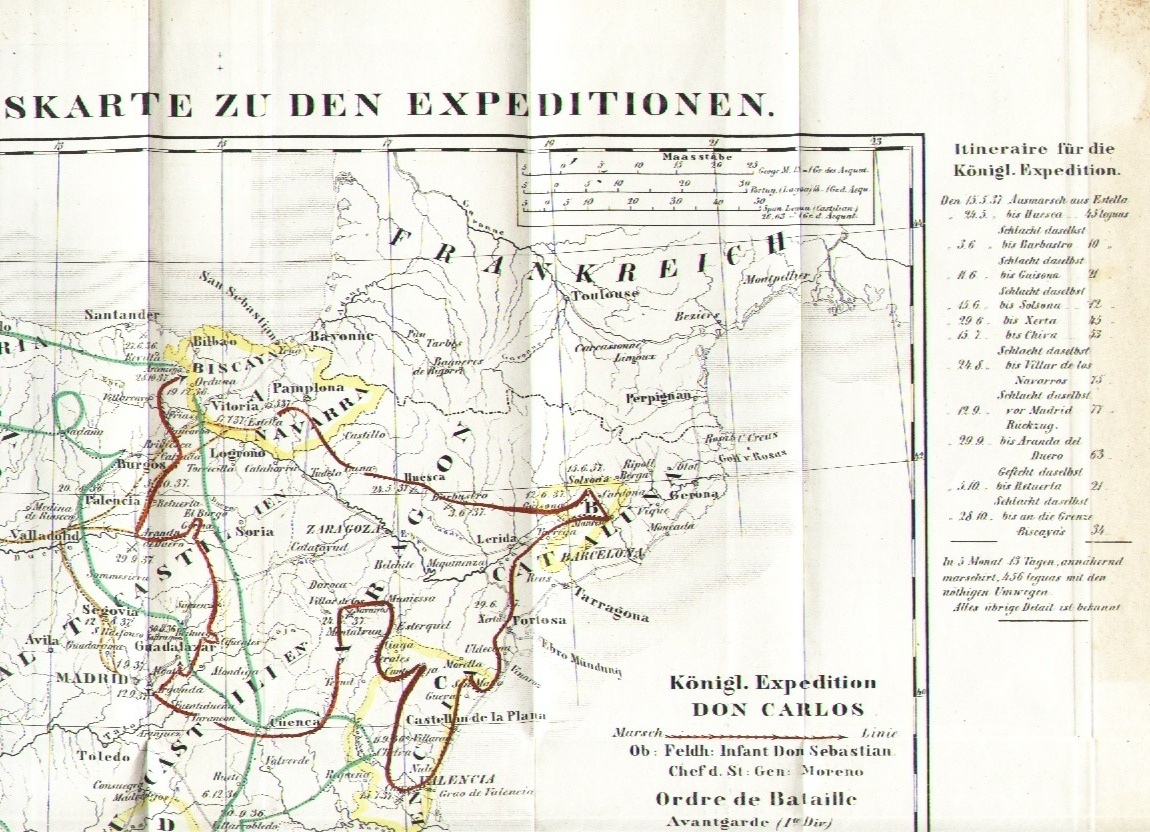
Basque, Catalan, and Valencian Carlist outbreaks, as well as military expeditions across the north-east of Spain

The war was long and hard, and the Carlist forces (labeled "the Basque army" by John F. Bacon) achieved important victories in the north under the direction of the brilliant general Tomás de Zumalacárregui. The Basque commander swore an oath to uphold home rule in Navarre (fueros), subsequently being proclaimed commander in chief of Navarre. The Basque regional governments of Biscay, Álava, and Gipuzkoa followed suit by pledging obedience to Zumalacárregui. He took to the bush in the Amescoas (to become the Carlist headquarters, next to Estella-Lizarra), there making himself strong and avoiding the harassment of the Spanish forces loyal to Maria Christina (Isabella II). 3,000 volunteers with no resources came to swell his forces.

=== 1833 ===
==== Northern front ====
In December, Valdes's focus on Navarre allowed the Carlists in the other Basque provinces to regroup as the secondary units he left behind only patrolled the main roads and garrisoned the principal towns of the region. As local officials were mostly Carlists, men that returned to their towns were allowed to keep their weapons and thus join the Carlist army again. In response to the developing situation, Valdes established the death penalty for a number of offenses including returning to the Carlist bands after surrendering and accepting a pardon, encouraging or commanding others to join a Carlist band, failing to surrender one's weapons or give the authorities information on arms caches, and the distribution of subversive propaganda. Authorities would also face the death penalty if they failed to collect weapons from the inhabitants under them, if they allowed Carlist recruitment, or if they allowed mail in their jurisdiction to be stolen, except when faced by overwhelming force. Those who were reasonably suspected of these crimes but could not be proved guilty were instead sentenced to four years' hard labor. These measures were relatively ineffective.

Burunda valley within Navarre, where Zumalacárregui regrouped his forces in 1835.

Meanwhile, Zumalacárregui regrouped his forces in the Burunda valley along the road between Pamplona and Vitoria, which was conveniently placed between the Urbasa and Andia ranges and provided his troops with many escape routes through which they as locals could escape much more quickly than the Carlist regular troops could follow.

=== 1834 ===
In April 1834, France, Great Britain, Spain, and Portugal signed the treaty of the Quadruple Alliance. Under its terms, Pedro IV of Portugal would expel the Carlists and Miguel I from Portugal with the aid of Spanish troops and the British navy. In additional stipulations, France established stricter border controls to prevent the entry of men, weapons, and military supplies into Spain to Carlist hands. Britain also pledged arms and munitions as well as possible naval support if necessary and Portugal promised Spain all possible aid. Even though the treaty was a significant diplomatic victory and lessened the likelihood of Carlists receiving diplomatic recognition or aid from other countries, Spain did not receive much material aid from France or Britain for more than a year afterwards. With state coffers yet again empty and the Trienio Liberal loan issue with the financiers still not settled, Cea Bermudez's government fell.

==== Northern front ====
In summer 1834, Liberal (Isabeline) forces set fire to the Sanctuary of Arantzazu and a convent of Bera, while Zumalacárregui showed his toughest side when he had volunteers refusing to advance over Etxarri-Aranatz executed. The Carlist cavalry engaged and defeated in Viana an army sent from Madrid (14 September 1834), while Zumalacárregui's forces descended from the Basque Mountains over the Álavan Plains (Vitoria), and prevailed over general Manuel O'Doyle. The veteran general Espoz y Mina, a Liberal Navarrese commander, attempted to drive a wedge between the Carlist northern and southern forces, but Zumalacárregui's army managed to hold them back (late 1834).

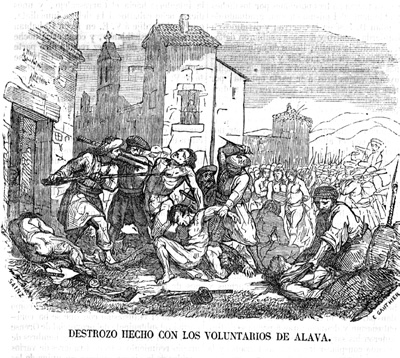
The Lord Eliot Convention sought to end indiscriminate executions by firing squad, such as those committed at Heredia, pictured here.

=== 1835 ===
In January, the liberal government of Francisco Martínez de la Rosa successfully narrowly defeated an attempted military coup d'état and then faced urban uprisings in Málaga, Zaragoza, and Murcia in the spring. The government's inability to deal with these crises as well as the lack of military success in the North forced the government to resign in June to be followed by a new government headed by former finance minister José María Queipo de Llano, 7th Count of Toreno.

In April, the British sent a mission under Edward Eliot, 3rd Earl of St Germans to convince both sides to spare the lives of prisoners and of the wounded as well as tell Don Carlos he had no hope of winning the war (Carlos thought that Eliot had come to propose an agreement which would end the war). Jerónimo Valdés and Zumalacárregui agreed not to kill prisoners, exchange them on a regular basis, respect the wounded, and to not execute political prisoners without trial. However, the agreement which came to be called the Lord Eliot Convention applied only to the Basque Country (although it could be applied to the rest of the country if war spread there). This is because the Liberals argued that Carlist troops outside the Basque Country were not regular troops and thus did not fall under the purview of the treaty. The Carlists themselves did not see the terms of the Convention as applying to foreign troops on the Liberal side.

By this point in the war, Zumalacárregui had so continuously defeated the Liberals that a majority of the officers in the Reserve Army believed they would only be able to win with foreign intervention. By late May, the government reluctantly requested the French for enough troops to occupy the Basque Country and the British for increased diplomatic and naval support. Britain did not believe this was yet necessary and asked France to limit itself to strengthening its border. France thus also denied the Spanish request. In response and in the face of Carlos's near-total control of the Basque Country, Madrid asked to be allowed to recruit volunteers which was agreed to in June. Thus, the British Auxiliary Legion (Note: So called due to its purpose as an auxiliary to the Spanish Legion) was created and the French Foreign Legion expanded its activities to Spain under the name of the Spanish Legion.

==== Northern front ====
In January, the Carlists took over Baztan in an operation where the general Espoz y Mina narrowly escaped a severe defeat and capture, while the local Liberal Gaspar de Jauregi Artzaia ('the Shepherd') and his chapelgorris were neutralized in Zumarraga and Urretxu. By May, virtually all Gipuzkoa and seigneury of Biscay were in Carlist hands. Opposing his advisers and Zumalacárregui's plan, Carlos V decided to conquer Bilbao, defended by the Royal Navy and the British Auxiliary Legion. With such an important city in his power, the Prussian or Russian Tsarist banks would give him credit to win the war; one of the most important problems for Carlos was a lack of funds.

In the siege of Bilbao, Zumalacárregui was wounded in the leg by a stray bullet. The wound was not serious, he was treated by a number of doctors, famously by Petrikillo (nowadays meaning in Basque 'quack' or 'dodgy healer'). The relationship of the pretender to the throne and the commander in chief was at least distant; not only had they differed in operative strategy, but Zumalacárregui's popularity could undermine Carlos's own authority, as in the early stages of the war, the Basque general was offered the crown of Navarre and the lordship of Biscay as king of the Basques. The injury did not heal properly, and finally General Zumalacárregui died on June 25. Many historians believe the circumstances of his death were suspicious, and have noted that the general had many enemies in the Carlist court; however, to date no further light has been shed on this point.

==== Southern front ====
Up until this point, the Carlists had not managed to mobilize significantly outside of guerrilla bands that served mostly to prevent the Liberals from fully mobilizing against Zumalacárregui for fear of their growing out of control, particularly in Castile. In March 1835, the government created a reserve of two infantry divisions and a cavalry squadron to guard Castile from Carlist incursions as opposed to following Francisco Espoz y Mina's plan to drive away the Carlists. Furthermore, that same month when they attempted to transfer two infantry regiments to the Basque Country from Catalonia, General Manuel Llauder protested to the Secretary of War that doing so would amount to "handing ourselves to the rebels". General Llauder's purges prior to the death of Ferdinand prevented the Carlists from staging a successful uprising immediately after his death and the subsequent defeat at Battle of Mayals as well as capture and execution of General Juan Romagosa further affected the insurrectionists. Nonetheless, the popular base in Catalonia and sizeable guerrilla leaders like Rafael Tristany and Benito "Mosen Benet" Tristany were promising to the Carlists if they could properly mobilize them. In Aragon and Valencia, the successes of Liberal General Jerónimo Valdés effectively destroyed the Carlist fighting force in the area save for small dispersed bands.

In response to the continued successes of Zumalacárregui in the north, Madrid withdrew most of its troops to the south of the Ebro river partly to avoid further defeats and partly to prevent the Carlists from entering Castile.

=== 1836 ===
==== Southern front ====
In the south, the Carlist general Miguel Gómez Damas attempted to establish a strong position there for the Carlists, and he left Ronda on November 18, 1836, entering Algeciras on November 22. But, after Gómez Damas departed from Algeciras, he was defeated by Ramón María Narváez y Campos at the Battle of Majaceite. An English commentator wrote that "it was at Majaciete that [Narváez] rescued Andalucía from the Carlist invasion by a brilliant coup de main, in a rapid but destructive action, which will not readily be effaced from the memory of the southern provinces."

At Arcos de la Frontera, the Liberal Diego de Leon managed to detain a Carlist column by his squadron of 70 cavalry until Liberal reinforcements arrived.

Ramon Cabrera had collaborated with Gómez Damas in the expedition of Andalusia where, after defeating the Liberals, he occupied Córdoba and Extremadura. He was pushed out after his defeat at Villarrobledo in 1836.

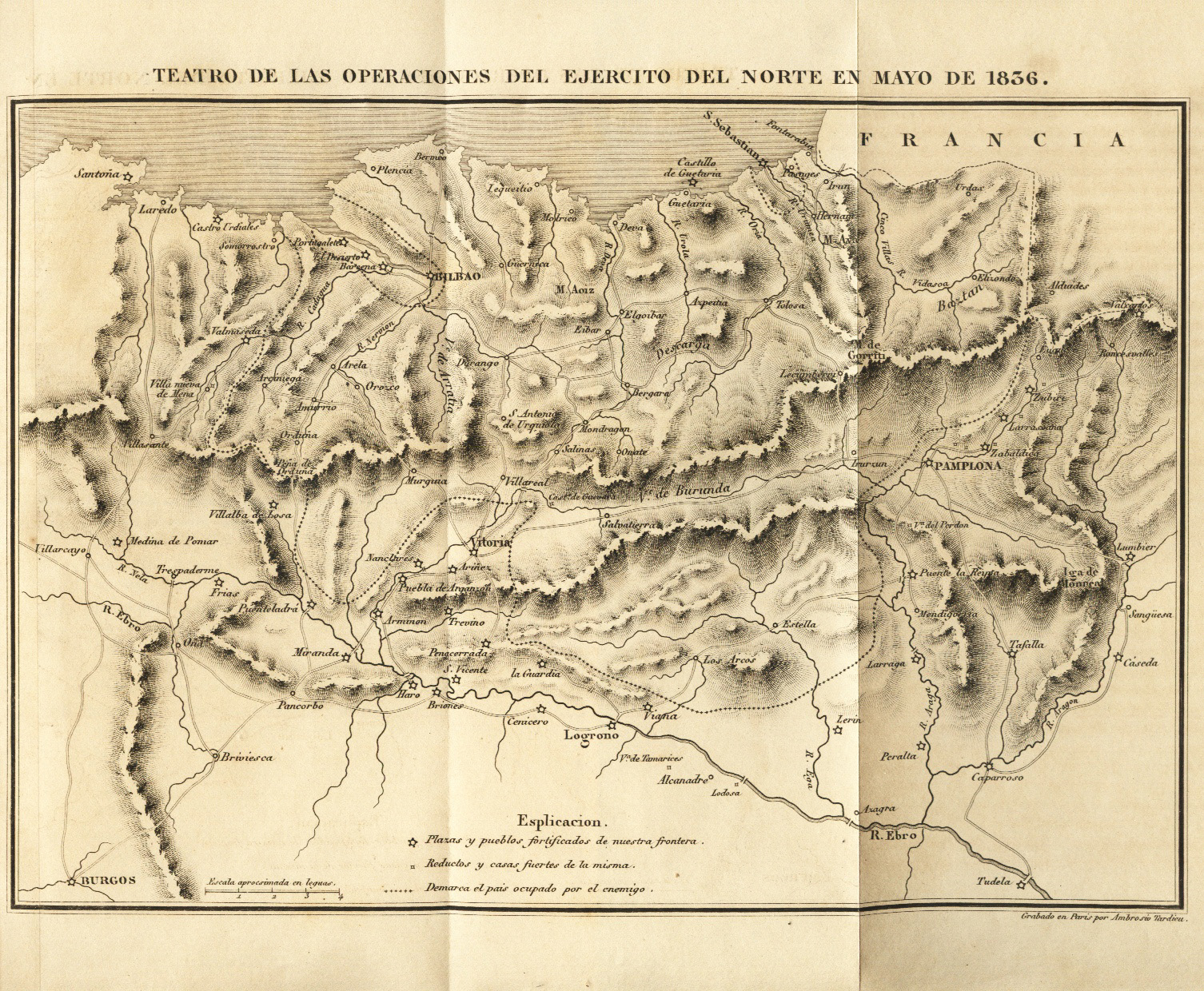
Theater of operations of the Liberal Army of the North, May 1836

=== 1837 ===
Meanwhile, In the east, Carlist general Ramón Cabrera held the initiative in the war, but his forces were too few to achieve a decisive victory over the Liberal forces loyal to Madrid. In 1837, the Carlist effort culminated in the Royal Expedition, which reached the walls of Madrid, but subsequently retreated after the Battle of Aranzueque.

=== 1838 ===
After the death of Zumalacárregui in 1835, the Liberals slowly regained the initiative but were not able to win the war in the Basque districts until 1839. They failed to recover the Carlist fortress of Morella and suffered a defeat at the Battle of Maella (1838).

=== 1839–40 ===
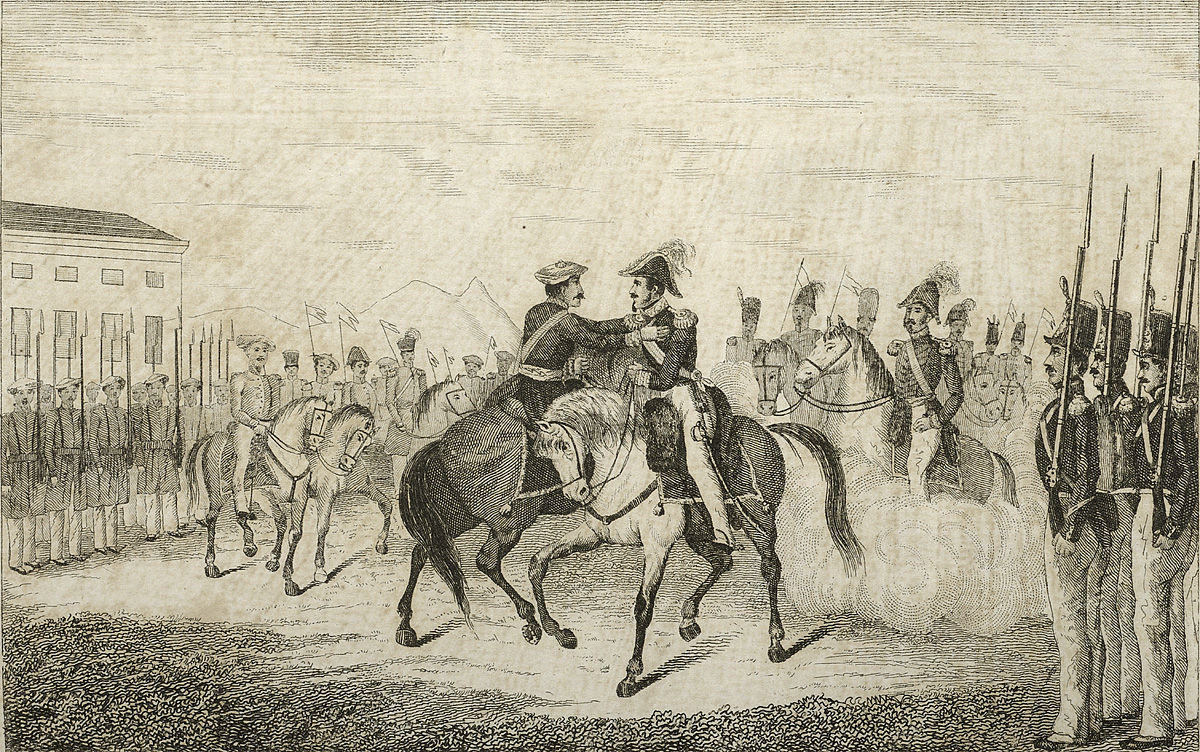
The Embrace of Bergara put an end to the First Carlist War in the Basque Country (1839)

The war effort had taken a heavy toll on Basque economy and regional public finances with a population shaken by a myriad of war related plights—human losses, poverty, disease—and tired with Carlos's own absolutist ambitions and disregard for their self-government. The moderate Jose Antonio Muñagorri negotiated as of 1838 a treaty in Madrid to put an end to war ("Peace and Fueros") leading to the Embrace of Bergara (also Vergara), ratified by Basque moderate liberals and disaffected Carlists across all the main cities and countryside.

The war in the Basque Country ended with the Convenio de Bergara, also known as the Abrazo de Bergara ("the Embrace of Bergara", Bergara in Basque) on 31 August 1839, between the Liberal general Baldomero Espartero, Count of Luchana and the Carlist General Rafael Maroto. Some authors have written that General Maroto was a traitor who forced Carlos to accept the peace with little focus as to the precise context in the Basque Country.

In the east, General Cabrera continued fighting, but when Espartero conquered Morella and Cabrera in Catalonia (30 May 1840), the fate of the Carlists was sealed. Espartero progressed to Berga, and by mid-July 1840 the Carlist troops had to flee to France. Considered a hero, Cabrera returned to Portugal in 1848 for the Second Carlist War.

== Aftermath ==
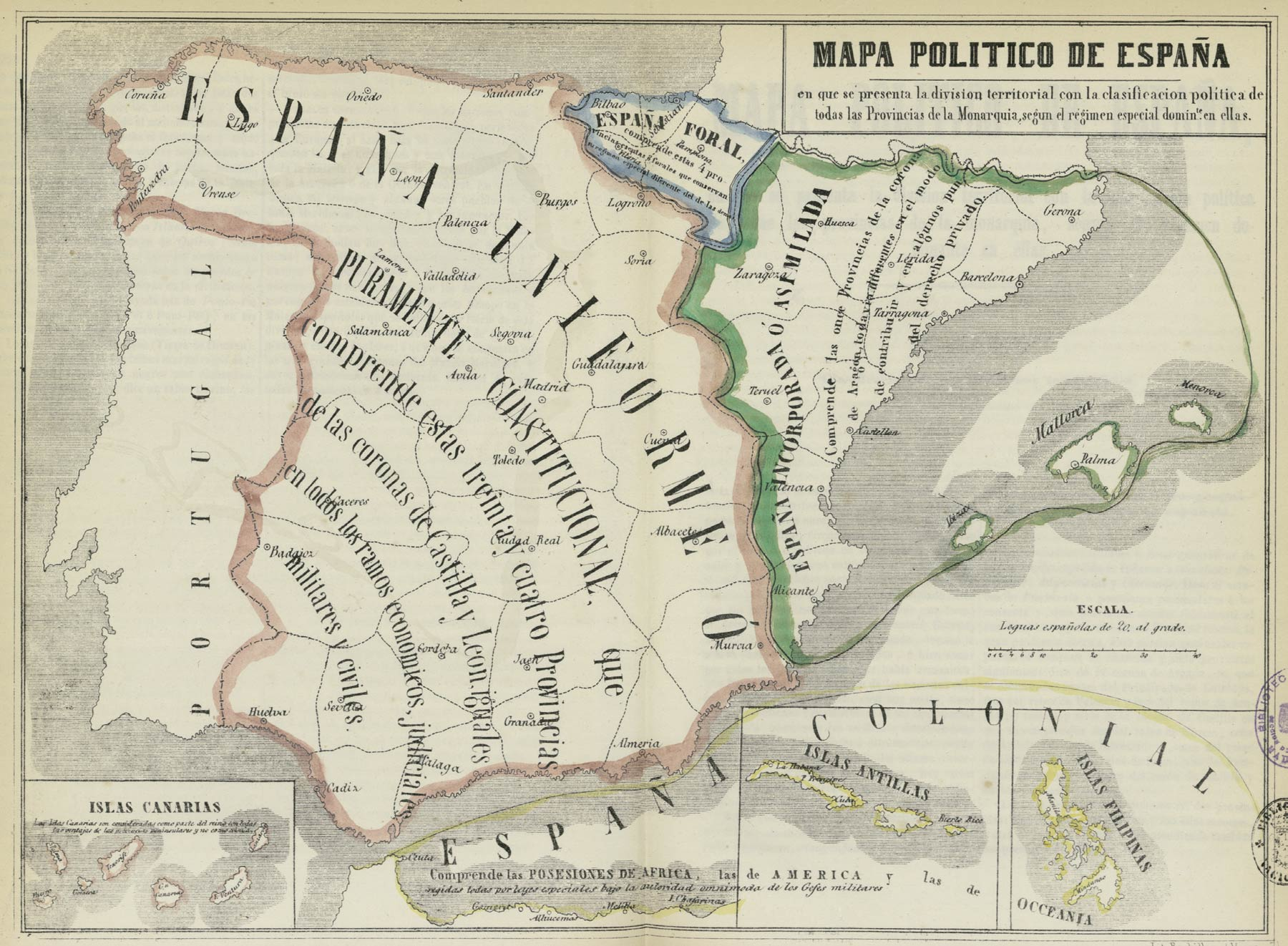
Spain in 1854. It shows what areas remained with different law, tax and military draft systems after the First Carlist War, merged into a sole Spanish jurisdiction after the Third Carlist War (1876).

=== Demographics ===
Areas not involved in the conflict were not affected demographically, but the main areas of battle were devastated. Cities such as Bilbao (which went from 15,000 to 10,234) lost between a quarter and half of their populations. The worst victim was Segura de los Baños, which lost 52% of its inhabitants. Direct losses due to the conflict, especially at the national level, are harder to establish, due to the state of contemporary statistical records.

=== Economics ===
The war left Spain significantly weakened. During the war, rural populations in conflict zones were frequently moved to fortified towns. This deprived the affected areas of agricultural labor, reducing production, and burdened the towns with refugees.

=== Politics ===
The Basques managed to keep a reduced version of their previous home rule (taxation, military draft) in exchange for their unequivocal incorporation into Spain (October 1839), now centralized, and divided into provinces.

In 1840, General Baldomero Espartero became premier and regent with the support of the Progressives in Spain. The financial and trading bourgeoisie burgeoned, but after Carlist war the Treasury's coffers were depleted and the army pending discharge.

In 1841 a separate treaty was signed by officials of the Council of Navarre (the Diputación Provincial, established in 1836), such as the Liberal Yanguas y Miranda, without the mandatory approval of the parliament of the kingdom (the Cortes). That compromise (called later the Ley Paccionada, the Compromise Act) accepted further curtailments to self-government, and more importantly officially turned the Kingdom of Navarre into a province of Spain (August 1841).

In September 1841, Espartero's uprising had its follow-up in the military occupation of the Basque Country, and subsequent suppression by decree of Basque home rule altogether, definitely bringing the Ebro customs over to the Pyrenees and the coast. The region was gripped by a wave of famine, and many took to overseas emigration at either side of the Basque Pyrenees, to America.

Espartero's regime came to an end in 1844 after the moderate Conservatives gained momentum, and a settlement was found for the stand-off in the Basque Provinces.

== Legacy ==
The war is often paralleled to the Spanish Civil War a century later. In the words of Mark Lawrence:

[...] the enduring stereotype of the 'Two Spains'—which for so long was deemed central to understanding modern Spain—might have seemed an equally compelling paradigm for the First Carlist War: whereas the Spanish Civil War saw Nationalists and Republicans fighting for their respective hegemonic visions of Spain, the First Carlist War offers a comparable struggle between legitimist Carlists and modernising Liberals which took twice as long to resolve as its successor, exalted relatively more casualties, and even anticipated the International Brigades.

Paul Johnson agrees with the characterization, writing "both royalists and liberals began to develop strong local followings, which were to perpetuate and transmute themselves, through many open commotions and deceptively tranquil intervals, until they exploded in the merciless civil war of 1936-39."

=== Spanish historiography ===
Spanish memory of the conflict is disproportionately based on the Carlist side, even when the vast majority of Spain's land and population remained Liberal throughout the conflict. A large factor in this is the official encouragement by the Spanish government at different points in its history (most recently Francoist Spain) of pro-Carlist historians. Francoist historians depicted the Carlist Wars as part of the fight between Roman Catholicism and anti-Spanish liberals that "waging war against their own people". Melchor Ferrer, for example, authored a 30 volume work on Spanish traditionalism. Marxist historians of the 70s criticized Carlism, but were not as highly influential as their Carlist counterparts. Since the fall of the Franco dictatorship, however, Spanish historiography has become much less partisan.

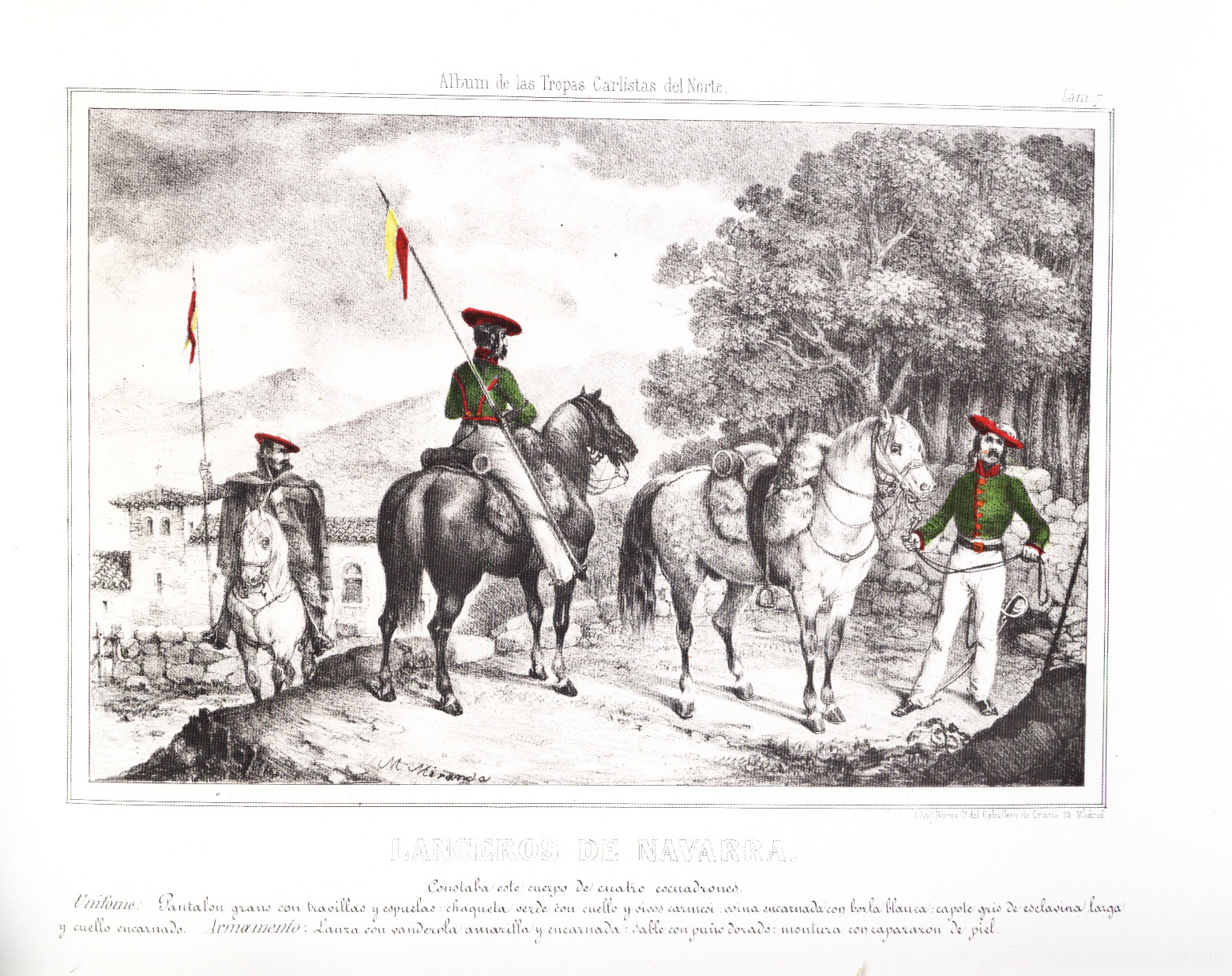
Carlist troops from Navarre

== Chronology of battles ==
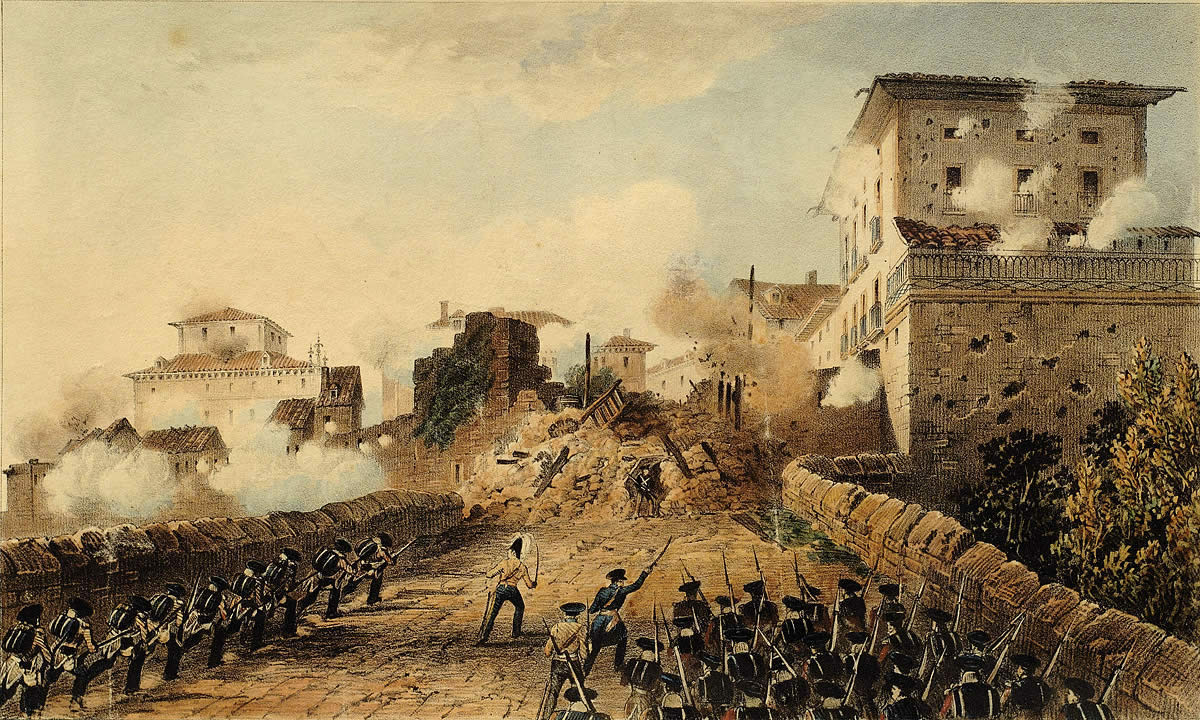
Battle of Behobia, May 1837

  - Battle of Malays (April 10, 1834) - Liberal victory
  - Battle of Alsasua (April 22, 1834) - Carlist victory
  - Battle of Gulina (June 18, 1834) - Carlist victory
  - Battle of Alegría de Álava (October 27, 1834) - Carlist victory
  - Battle of Venta de Echávarri (October 28, 1834) - Carlist victory
  - Battle of Mendaza (December 12, 1834) - Liberal victory
  - First Battle of Arquijas (December 15, 1834) - Liberal victory
  - Second Battle of Arquijas (February 5, 1835) - Carlist victory
  - Battle of Artaza (April 22, 1835) - Carlist victory
  - Battle of Mendigorría (July 16, 1835) - Liberal victory
  - Battle of Arlabán (January 16–18, 1836) - Carlist victory
  - Battle of Terapegui (April 26, 1836) - Liberal victory
  - Battle of Villarrobledo (September 20, 1836) - Liberal victory
  - Battle of Majaceite (November 23, 1836) - Liberal victory
  - Battle of Luchana (December 24, 1836) - Liberal victory
  - Battle of Oriamendi (March 16, 1837) - Carlist victory
  - Battle of Huesca (March 24, 1837) - Liberal victory
  - Battle of Irún (May 17, 1837) - Liberal victory
  - Second Battle of Huesca (May 25, 1837) - Carlist victory
  - Battle of Barbastro (June 2, 1837) - Carlist victory
  - Battle of Chiva (15 July 1837) - Cristino victory
  - Battle of Villar de los Navarros (August 24, 1837) - Carlist victory
  - Battle of Andoain (September 14, 1837) - Carlist victory - End of the British Auxiliary Legion as an effective fighting force
  - Battle of Aranzueque (September 1837) - Liberal victory
  - Battle of Retuerta (October 4, 1837) - Liberal victory, end of the Royal Expedition
  - Battle of Maella (October 1, 1838) - Carlist victory
  - Battle of Peñacerrada (June 20–22, 1838) - Liberal victory
  - Battle of Ramales (May 13, 1839) - Liberal victory
