= Battle of Irún (1837) =

Battle of Irun
- Part of the Carlist Wars
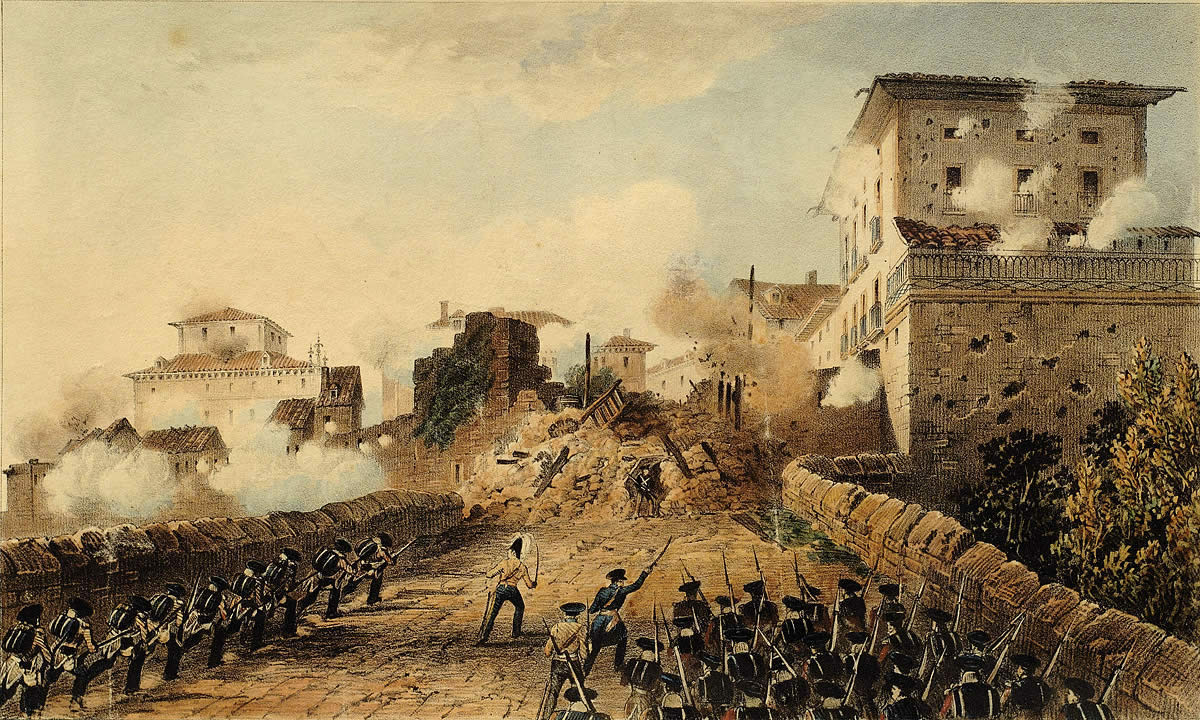
- The Battle of Irún, 17 May 1837.
Date	May 18th, 1837 (6 years, 9 months and 7 days)
Location	Spain
Result	British and Spanish Victory

Belligerents
Carlists	Christinos; Supported by: United Kingdom

Commanders and leaders
See list: Carlos V; Tomás Zumalacárregui; Ramón Cabrera; Rafael Maroto; González Moreno; Miguel Gómez Damas; Sebestian Gabriel	See list: Maria Christina; Isabella II; Genaro de Quesada; José Ramón Rodil; De Lacy Evans

Strength
Unknown	10,000; Over 5,000 volunteers from the British Foreign Legion in Spain

Casualties and losses
Carlists: Unknown	Liberals: Minor; British: Insignificant

The Battle of Irún was the critical battle during the First Carlist War. From the beginning of the war, the city was a Carlist stronghold and remained in their hands until May 18, 1837, when the British Foreign Legion led by Lieutenant-General George de Lacy Evans and supported by the auxiliary forces assaulted and captured the city on the same day.

== Sources ==
- Bullón de Mendoza y Gómez de Valugera, Alfonso (1992). La primera guerra carlista (in Spanish). Spain: Actas. ISBN 84-87863-08-6.
- Lawrence, Mark (2014). Spain's First Carlist War, 1833-40. Palgrave Macmillan. ISBN 978-1137401748.
