= Battle of Mayals =

Battle of the First Carlist War

- Part of the First Carlist War
Date	10 April 1834
Location	Catalonia, Spain 41.365833°N 0.505278°E
Result	Liberal victory

Belligerents
Carlists	Liberals

Commanders and leaders
Manuel Carnicer Griñón; Ramon Cabrera; José Miralles; Joaquin Quílez	José Carratalá; Manuel Breton; Agustín Nogueras

Casualties and losses
approx. 300 dead, 700 captured	approx. 100 dead
- Location of Mayals within Catalonia

The Battle of Mayals (Spanish pronunciation: [majals]) in Catalonia was fought in the afternoon of April 10, 1834 between a Carlist force led by Manuel Carnicer Griñón and a Liberal force led by José Carratalá near the town of Mayals. The Liberal victory negatively affected Carlism's spread in the region in the early stages of the war.

== Background ==
Carnicer, leader of the Aragonese Carlists since February, was leading a small division towards Tarragona in order to protect insurrectionists there when Carratalá, commander general of the Royal forces in the city mobilized to meet him, joined by Manuel Breton's column from Tortosa and urban militias from Reus and other nearby towns. Carnicer's objective was to establish strategic control in the area to create a connection between insurrectionists in Catalonia and the Maestrazgo which would allow those two forces to cooperate.

== Battle ==
Carnicer set up his forces at the peak of the hills immediately adjacent to the town: Cabrera leading the vanguard, Miralles the left flank supported by cavalry, and Quílez on the right. Carratalá organized his troops to match this formation.

The Liberal troops opened fire, led by the urban militias of Porrera, Falcet, and Flix as well as the snipers from Tortosa. The Carlists responded and firing broke out throughout the field. Carratalá then reinforced his frontline, while Carnicer was unable to do so and so his line folded towards the center. Breton followed with a cavalry charge on the Carlist right flank, which the cavalry supporting Quílez was unable to repeal. Subsequently, the Carlist cavalry dispersed and their right flank broke. Carnicer himself attempted to fight off the Liberal cavalry with his rifle butt to no avail as the collapse of his forces' right flank had already sealed his defeat.

== Aftermath ==
While the deaths in the battle were significant, the most important loss for the Carlists was further spread of the insurrection in Catalonia. The historian Antonio Pirala—who obtained access to confidential Carlist correspondence—believes that "over 20,000 men would have declared themselves for Carlos if Carnicer had triumphed in Mayals". His forces at the after the battle numbered approximately 100, and with those he marched towards the Maestrazgo.
