= Wilhelm von Radhen =

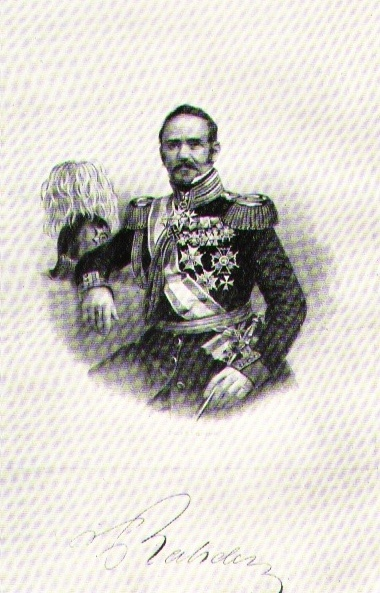
Wilhelm von Rahden.

Baron Wilhelm von Rahden (10 August 1793 in Breslau – 2 November 1860 in Gotha) was a German officer and writer.

== Life ==
=== Napoleonic Wars ===
Educated at a military school, he enlisted in the Prussian Army in 1809 and took part in the campaigns between 1813 and 1815 in Saxony, France and Belgium. He was wounded at the battles of Lützen, Leipzig and Waterloo. In 1829 he left the Prussian Army at the rank of captain to become a staff officer in the Russian army, a role he held for a year. In 1832, as an artillery officer, he was severely wounded serving in the defence of Antwerp.

=== Spain ===
He was in England in early 1837 when he received an offer to enlist in the Carlist army. In April 1837 he arrived in Navarre to cross the Pyrenees into Spain. He was taken to join the Carlist siege of San Sebastián, which had been ongoing since 1835. A few days before his arrival the Carlists had won a victory at Oriamendi, beating off a Liberal force trying to lift the siege. Days later he was received by Infante Sebastian, commander of the northern Carlist forces, at his headquarters in Hernani. He later said that he had read of this general's exploits in the newspapers and was disappointed to find out that he was in fact an old-looking young man, almost bald, with a short beard and no military bearing, who avoided speaking of the war itself and instead merely spoke admiringly about Napoleon I and Frederick the Great. von Rahden concludes his account by realising that Prince Sebastian was comparing himself with these two men and adds:

My suspicion was heightened when I saw that my partner was leaning theatrically on a large cavalry sabre hanging from his waist.

He received orders to march to Estella to present himself to the Infante Carlos (the Carlist claimant to the Spanish throne) - Carlos had established his court there and was preparing to launch the 'Expedición Real' (Royal Expedition) to capture Madrid and take the throne. Wearing a flamboyant Dutch Army uniform (the last uniform with which he had been issued ) and his four medals to date, von Rahden was presented to Carlos on 10 May. On their first meeting, Carlos promoted him to lieutenant colonel, which was a major surprise for von Rahden, as he had never held the intervening rank of major. Other Germans on the Carlist side had similar experiences, leading von Rahden to comment that things went faster in the Carlist army than in the Prussian one. The other Germans included prince Felix Lichnowsky, who had joined the Carlist forces three months earlier and been made brigadier general aged only 23.

On 15 May 1837 the Carlist expedition crossed the river Arga heading east, making their planned advance to the north of Aragon in an attempt to join up with existing Carlist forces in Catalonia, seize power and establish a Carlist regime there, cross the river Ebro and (in combination with Ramón Cabrera's forces, then dominating the Maestrazgo) assault Madrid.

=== Retirement ===
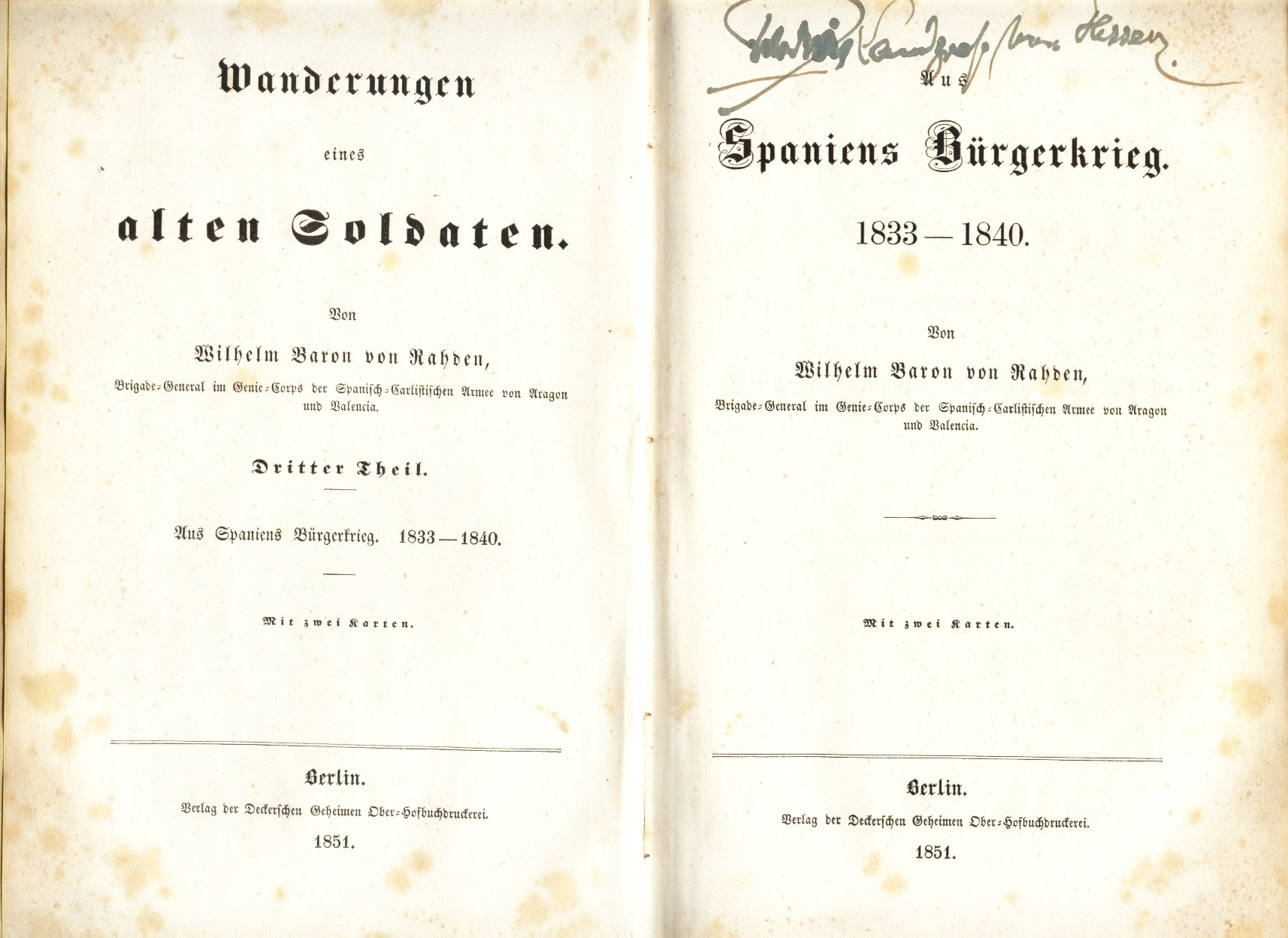
Title page of the third part of his memoirs (Wanderungen eines alten Soldaten).

== Works ==
- Cabrera. Erinnerungen aus dem Spanischen Bürgerkrieg. Frankfurt am Main, 1840
- Wanderungen eines alten Soldaten. Erster Teil. Berlin, 1846
- Wanderungen eines alten Soldaten. Zweiter Teil. Berlin, 1847
- Wanderungen eines alten Soldaten. Dritter Teil. Berlin, 1851
- Miguel Gomez. Ein Lebenslichtbild. Berlin, 1859

== Bibliography ==
- Roman Polsakiewicz: 'Ein unbekannter Brief Bettina von Arnims an Baron Wilhelm von Rahden'. (An Unknown Letter from Bettina von Arnim to Baron Wilhelm von Rahden) In: Wirkendes Wort. Deutsche Sprache und Literatur in Forschung und Lehre, Bd. 36 (1986), S. 170–171.
- Gerd Spiekermann: Wilhelm Rahden. 'Een meist vergeten Schrieversmann ut dat Ollnborger Land.' In: Kay Dohnke etc. (ed.s): Vun Böker un Minschen. Festschrift für Friedrich W. Michelsen zum 60. Geburtstag. Quickborn Verlag, Hamburg 1996, S. 139-147 (Quickborn; 86)
- Oskar Stavenhagen: Genealogisches Handbuch der baltischen Ritterschaften Teil 3, 2: Kurland, Lfg. 9-12, Görlitz, S. 699 and 731
- Baltische Historische Kommission (ed.): 'Rahden, Wilhelm Job. Theodor Friedrich Moritz Bar. v.' In: BBLd – Baltisches Biographisches Lexikon digital. Göttingen 2012
