= Vicente González Moreno =

Spanish general (1778–1839)

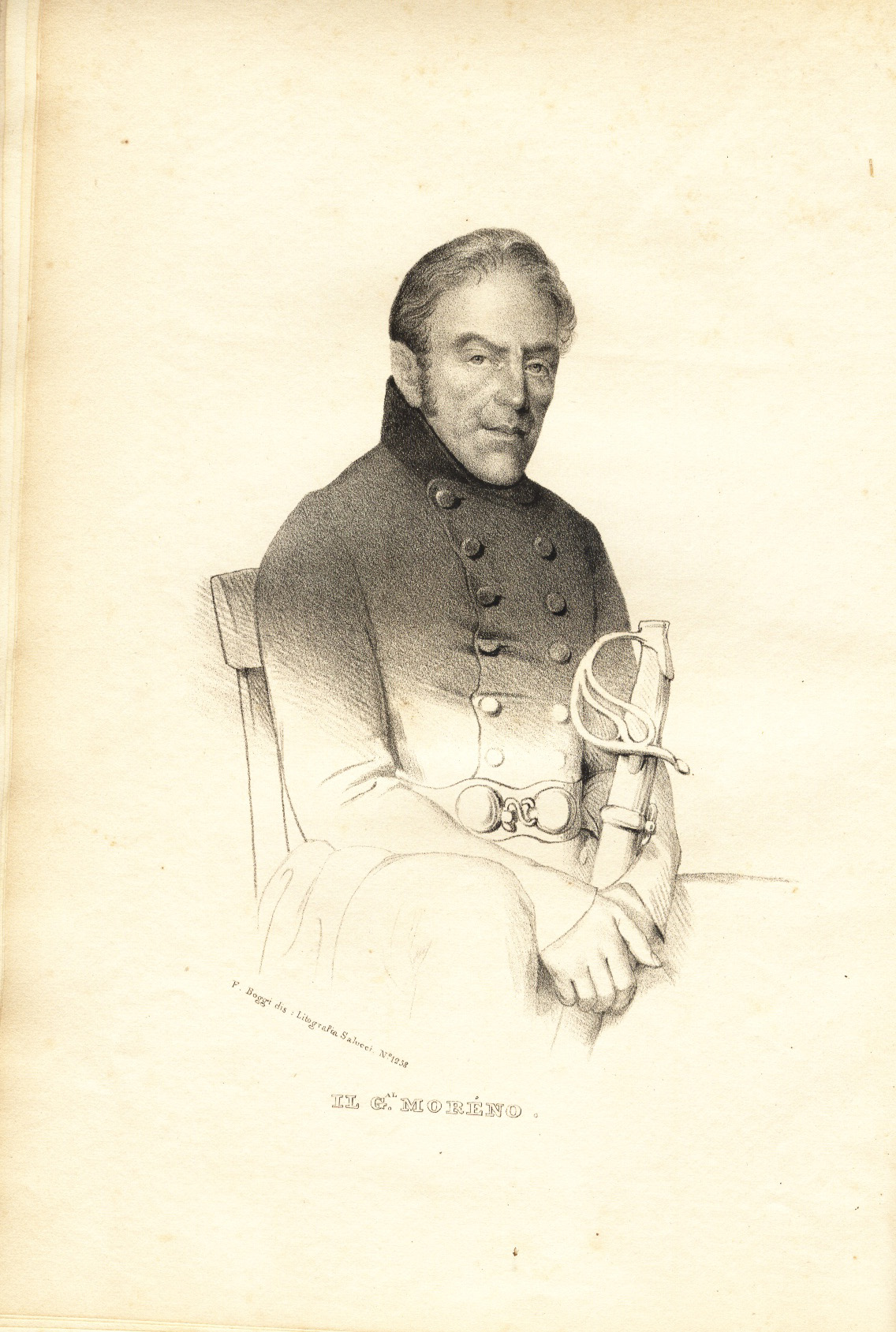
Vicente Gómez Moreno

Vicente González Moreno (9 December 1778, Cádiz – 6 September 1839) was a Spanish general who supported the Carlists during the First Carlist War. He was appointed commander of Carlist forces after the death of Zumalacárregui.

As a cadet, he participated in the Spanish War of Independence, achieving the rank of brigadier. He declared himself in support of the Carlist uprising in 1832. He was imprisoned but managed to escape to Portugal and join the retinue of Don Carlos, with whom he traveled to England. He returned to Spain in 1835.

He lost the Battle of Mendigorria in 1835.

An enemy of Rafael Maroto, he opposed the so-called Convenio de Vergara, the agreement that ended the First Carlist War. He fled to France but was assassinated by Carlist soldiers at Urdax on 6 September 1839.
