= Francisco Xavier da Silva Pereira, 1st Count of Antas =

Francisco da Silva Pereira
- Count of Antas
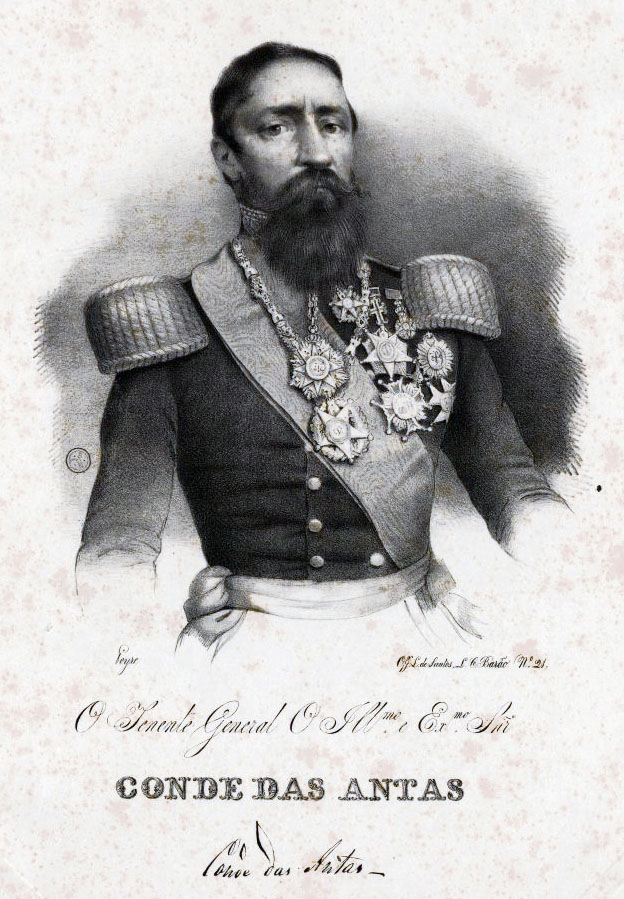

Count of Antas
- Full name: Francisco Xavier da Silva Pereira
- Born: 14 March 1793; Valença, Kingdom of Portugal
- Died: 20 May 1852 (aged 59); Lisbon, Kingdom of Portugal
- Noble family: da Silva Pereira
- Mother: Antónia José de Abreu

Francisco Xavier da Silva Pereira, 1st Count of Antas (14 March 1793 – 20 May 1852) was a Portuguese nobleman and a leading soldier of the period of the Liberal Wars.

== Life ==
The son of a military family, he served in the Peninsular War against Napoleon as an officer in the first battalion of the Leal Legião Lusitana, serving in the battles of Albuera, Bussaco, Nive, Nivelle, Salamanca, Vitoria, Orthez and Toulouse, for several of which he was decorated.

He was prominent among those who opposed the absolutist government of the usurper Dom Miguel. He took part in the Chartist rebellion against Miguel at Porto in May 1828, and subsequently escaped to England to place himself under the authority of Dom Pedro, the ex-Emperor of Brazil, who was organizing resistance on behalf of his daughter, the legitimate Queen Maria II.

In August, Silva Pereira sailed to Madeira as part of a contingent sent to strengthen the forces of the governor, José Travassos Valdez, who was holding out for the Queen, but Madeira was almost immediately captured by Miguel's forces and Silva Pereira joined Travassos Valdez in the evacuation of the Queen's supporters to England. He then served in Dom Pedro's forces in the recapture of the Azores and the Portuguese Civil War of 1832–34 in which the Miguelites were defeated.

In 1835 he was named Baron das Antas, becoming Viscount in 1836 and Count in 1838. In 1836 he was the General in command of the Portuguese Expeditionary Force that was sent to aid the Queen of Spain during the Carlist Wars. Recalled in September 1837 because of the revolt of the Chartist Marshals, he held the balance of military power but adhered to the legitimate government of Maria II and defeated the insurrection at the Battle of Ruivães on 20 September 1837. During the Patuleia or Little Civil War of 1846–47 he was head of the revolutionary Junta of Porto.
