= List of provosts of Edinburgh =

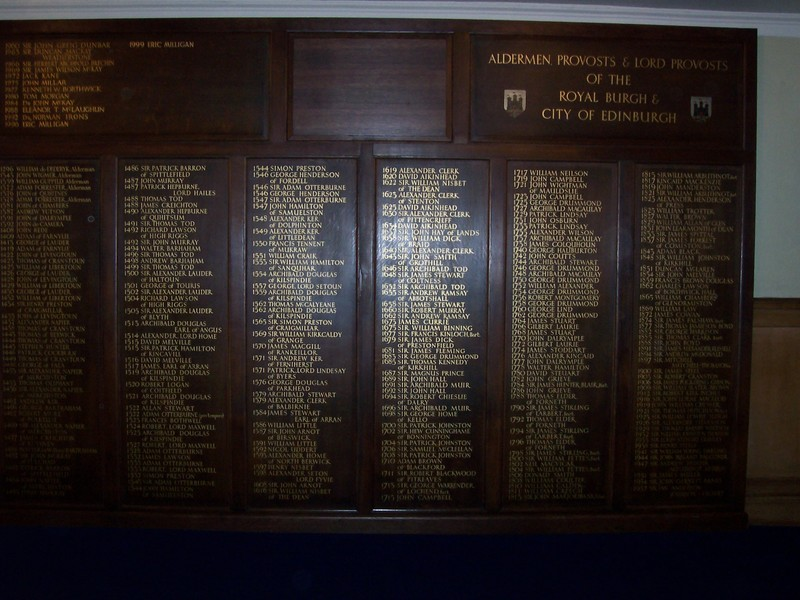
List of lords provost in Edinburgh City Chambers

The Right Honourable Lord Provost of Edinburgh is the convener of the City of Edinburgh Council. They are elected by the city council and serve not only as the chair of that body, but as a figurehead for the entire city. They are also ex officio the Lord-Lieutenant of Edinburgh. They are equivalent in many ways to the institution of Mayor that exists in many other countries.

While some of Scotland's local authorities elect a Provost, only the four main cities (Edinburgh, Glasgow, Aberdeen and Dundee) have a Lord Provost. In Edinburgh this position dates from 1667, when Charles II elevated the Provost to the status of Lord Provost, with the same rank and precedence as the Lord Mayor of London. The title of Lord Provost is enshrined in the Local Government etc. (Scotland) Act 1994.

== Current lord provost ==
In total, there have been 256 provosts and lord provosts.

The current lord provost is Robert Aldridge.

== Past provosts of Edinburgh ==
The first named individual overseeing Edinburgh was William de Dederyk, in 1296, who is described as an alderman. The second named alderman is John Wigmer in 1344. This is followed by William Guppeld, 1362–1369, and Sir Adam Forrester of Corstorphine in 1373.

=== 14th century ===
- (1377) John de Quhitness (John of Whiteness) first use of the term "Provost" on 18 May 1377
- (1378) Sir Adam Forrester (see above)
- (1381) John de Camera (John of Chambers)
- (1387) Andrew Yutson or Yichtson
- (1392) John of Dalrymple

The following decade includes a period with mention only of Baillies.

=== 15th century ===
- (1403) Alexander Napier
- (1408) John Rede
- (1410-1411) Adam of Farnielee
- (1413) Sir George of Lauder and Haltoun
- (1419) Adam of Farnielee
- (1422) John of Levingtoun (Livingston) (alderman not provost)
- (1425) Thomas de Cranstoun
- (1425) William of Liberton
- (1427) George of Lauder
- (1428) John of Livingston
- (1429) William of Liberton
- (1434) Sir Henry Preston of Craigmillar
- (1435) John of Levingtoun
- (1437) Alexander Napier of Merchiston
- (1438 to 1445) Thomas of Cranstoun
- (1445) Steven Hunter
- (1446) Patrick Cockburn
- (1449) Thomas de Cranstoun
- (1451) George of Fala
- (1453) Sir Alexander Napier of Merchiston
- (1455) Thomas Oliphant
- (1456) Sir Alexander Napier of Merchiston
- (1462) Alexander Ker
- (1466) George Bartraham
- (1467) Robert Mure of Polkellie
- (1469) Sir Alexander Napier of Merchiston
- (1477) James Creichton of Ruthven or Rowan
- (1481) William Bertraham, the first to receive a regular salary (£20 per year)
- (1482) Sir John Murray of Touchadam
- (1482) Patrick Barron, of Spittlefield
- (1484) John Napier of Merchiston, eldest son of Sir Alexander Napier
- (1485) Sir Jamie Swanney
- (1486) Sir Patrick Barron, of Spittlefield
- (1487) John Murray
- (1487) Patrick Hepburn, 1st Lord Hailes
- (1488) Thomas Tod
- (1490) Alexander Hepburne of Quhitsum
- (1491) Sir Thomas Tod
- (1492) Richard Lawson of High Riggs
- (1492) Sir John Murray
- (1493) Richard Lawson of High Riggs
- (1494) Walter Barhaham
- (1496) Sir Thomas Tod
- (1498) Walter Barhaham or Bertraham
- (1499) Sir Thomas Tod

=== 16th century ===
- (1500) Sir Alexander Lauder of Blyth
- (1501) George of Touris
- (1502) Sir Alexander Lauder of Blyth
- (1504) Richard Lawson of High Riggs
- (1505) Sir Alexander Lauder of Blyth (killed at the Battle of Flodden)
- (1513) George of Tours (inter-regnum)
- (1513) Archibald Douglas, 6th Earl of Angus ("Bell the Cat")
- (1514) Alexander Home, 3rd Lord Home
- (1514) David Melville
- (1515) Sir Patrick Hamilton of Kingavill
- (1516) David Melville
- (1517) James Hamilton, 1st Earl of Arran
- (1519) Archibald Douglas of Kilspindie
- (1520) Robert Logan of Coitfield, the first to have an armed guard
- (1521) Archibald Douglas of Kilspindie
- (1522) Allan Stewart
- (1522) Adam Otterburn
- (1523) Francis Bothwell
- (1524) Robert Maxwell, 5th Lord Maxwell
- (1525) Archibald Douglas of Kilspindie
- (1527) Robert Maxwell, 5th Lord Maxwell
- (1528) Adam Otterburn
- (1532) James Lawson
- (1535) Adam Otterburn
- (1535) Robert Maxwell, 5th Lord Maxwell
- (1537) Simon Preston
- (1543) Sir Adam Otterburn
- (1544) James Hamilton of Stenhouse
- (1544) Simon Preston
- (1546) George Henderson of Fordell
- (1546) Sir Adam Otterburn
- (1546) George Henderson
- (1547) Sir Adam Otterburn
- (1547) James Hamilton of Stenhouse
- (1548) Alexander Ker of Dolphinton
- (1549) Alexander Ker of Littledean
- (1550) Francis Tennent of Mukraw
- (1551) William Craik
- (1554) Archibald Douglas of Kilspindie (II)
- (1555) Sir William Hamilton of Sanquhar
- (1557) George Seton, 7th Lord Seton
- (1559) Archibald Douglas of Kilspindie (II)
- (1562) Thomas McCalzean (McCalyeane)
- (1562) Archibald Douglas of Kilspindie (II)
- (1565) Sir Simon Preston of Craigmillar
- (1569) Sir William Kirkcaldy of Grange
- (1570) James Macgill of Nesbit
- (1571) Sir Andrew Ker of Ferniherst
- (1571) Patrick Lord Lindesay of Byers
- (1576) George Douglas of Parkhead
- (1579) Archibald Stewart
- (1579) Alexander Clerk of Balbirnie
- (1584) James Stewart, Earl of Arran
- (1586) William Little
- (1587) Sir John Arnot of Birswick
- (1591) William Little
- (1592) Nicol Uddert
- (1593) Alexander Home of North Berwick
- (1597) Henry Nisbet of Dean
- (1598) Alexander Seton, Lord Fyvie

=== 17th century ===
- (1608) Sir John Arnot
- (1616) Sir William Nisbet of Dean
- (1619) Alexander Clerk
- (1620) David Aikinhead
- (1622) Sir William Nisbet of Dean
- (1623) Alexander Clerk of Stenton
- (1625) David Aikinhead
- (1630) Sir Alexander Clerk of Pittencrieff
- (1634) Adam Hogg
- (1637) Sir John Hay of Lands
- (1638) Sir William Dick of Braid
- (1640) Sir Alexander Clerk of Pittencrieff
- (1643) Sir John Smith of Grothill
- (1646) Sir Archibald Tod
- (1648) Sir James Steuart, of Coltness
- (1652) Sir Archibald Tod
- (1654) Sir Andrew Ramsay, Lord Abbotshall
- (1658) Sir James Steuart, of Coltness
- (1660) Sir Robert Murray
- (1662) Sir Andrew Ramsay, Lord Abbotshall, became the first Lord Provost in 1667

== Lord Provosts of Edinburgh ==
- (1667) Sir Andrew Ramsay, Lord Abbotshall
- (1673) James Currie
- (1675) Sir William Binning of Wallyford
- (1677) Francis Kinloch of Gilmerton
- (1679) Sir James Dick of Prestonfield
- (1681) Sir James Flemming
- (1683) Sir George Drummond
- (1685) Sir Thomas Kennedy of Kirkhill
- (1687) Sir Magnus Prince
- (1689) Sir John Hall of Dunglass
- (1691) Sir Archibald Muir
- (1692) Sir John Hall of Dunglass
- (1694) Sir Robert Chieslie of Dalry
- (1696) Sir Archibald Muir
- (1698) Sir George Home of Kello

=== 18th century ===
- (1700) Sir Patrick Johnston
- (1702) Sir Hugh Cunningham of Bonnington
- (1704) Sir Patrick Johnston
- (1706) Sir Samuel McClellan
- (1708) Sir Patrick Johnston
- (1710) Adam Brown of Blackford
- (1711) Sir Robert Blackwood of Pitreavie
- 1713–1714 George Warrender, of Lochend
- (1715) John Campbell
- (1717) William Neilson
- (1719) John Campbell
- (1721) John Wightman of Mauldslie
- (1723) John Campbell
- (1725) George Drummond
- (1727) Archibald Macauley
- (1729) Patrick Lindsay
- (1731) John Osburn
- (1733) Patrick Lindsay
- (1735) Alexander Wilson
- (1737) Archibald Macauley
- (1738) James Colquhoun
- (1740) George Haliburton
- (1742) John Coutts
- (1744) Archibald Stewart
- (1746) George Drummond
- (1748) Archibald Macauley
- (1750) George Drummond
- 1752 William Alexander
- 1754 George Drummond
- 1756 Robert Montgomery
- 1758 George Drummond
- 1760 George Lind
- 1762 George Drummond
- 1764 James Stuart of Binend
- 1766 Gilbert Laurie of Polmont
- 1768 Sir James Stuart of Binend
- 1770 John Dalrymple
- 1772 Gilbert Laurie of Polmont
- 1774 James Stoddart
- 1776 Alexander Kincaid
- 1777 John Dalrymple
- 1778 Walter Hamilton
- 1780 David Steuart
- 1782 John Grieve
- 1784 Sir James Hunter Blair, 1st Baronet
- 1788 Thomas Elder of Forneth
- 1790 James Stirling
- 1794 Sir James Stirling of Larbert
- 1798 Sir James Stirling of Larbert

=== 19th century ===
- 1800 Sir William Fettes
- 1802 Neil McVicar
- 1804 Sir William Fettes
- 1808 Donald Smith
- 1808 William Coulter
- 1810 William Calder, Lord Provost of Edinburgh
- 1811 William Creech
- 1814 Sir John Marjoribanks, 1st Baronet
- 1815 Sir William Arbuthnot, 1st Baronet
- 1817 Kincaid Mackenzie
- 1819 John Manderston
- 1821 Sir William Arbuthnot, 1st Baronet
- 1823 Alexander Henderson of Press
- 1825 William Trotter of Ballindean
- 1827 Walter Brown
- 1829 William Allan of Glen
- 1831 John Learmonth of Dean
- 1833 Sir James Spittal
- 1837 Sir James Forrest, 1st Baronet of Comiston
- 1843 Adam Black
- 1848 Sir William Johnston of Kirkhill
- 1851 Duncan McLaren (Liberal)
- 1854 Sir John Melville
- 1859 Francis Brown Douglas
- 1862 Charles Lawson of Borthwick Hall
- 1865 William Chambers of Glenormiston (In 1867 gave licensed collar to Greyfriars Bobby)
- 1869 William Law
- 1872 James Cowan
- 1874 Sir James Falshaw, 1st Baronet
- 1877 Sir Thomas Jamieson Boyd
- 1882 Sir George Harrison
- 1885 Sir Thomas Clark
- 1888 Sir John Boyd of Maxpoffle
- 1891 Sir James Alexander Russell
- 1894 Sir Andrew McDonald
- 1897 Sir Mitchell Mitchell Thomson

=== 20th century ===
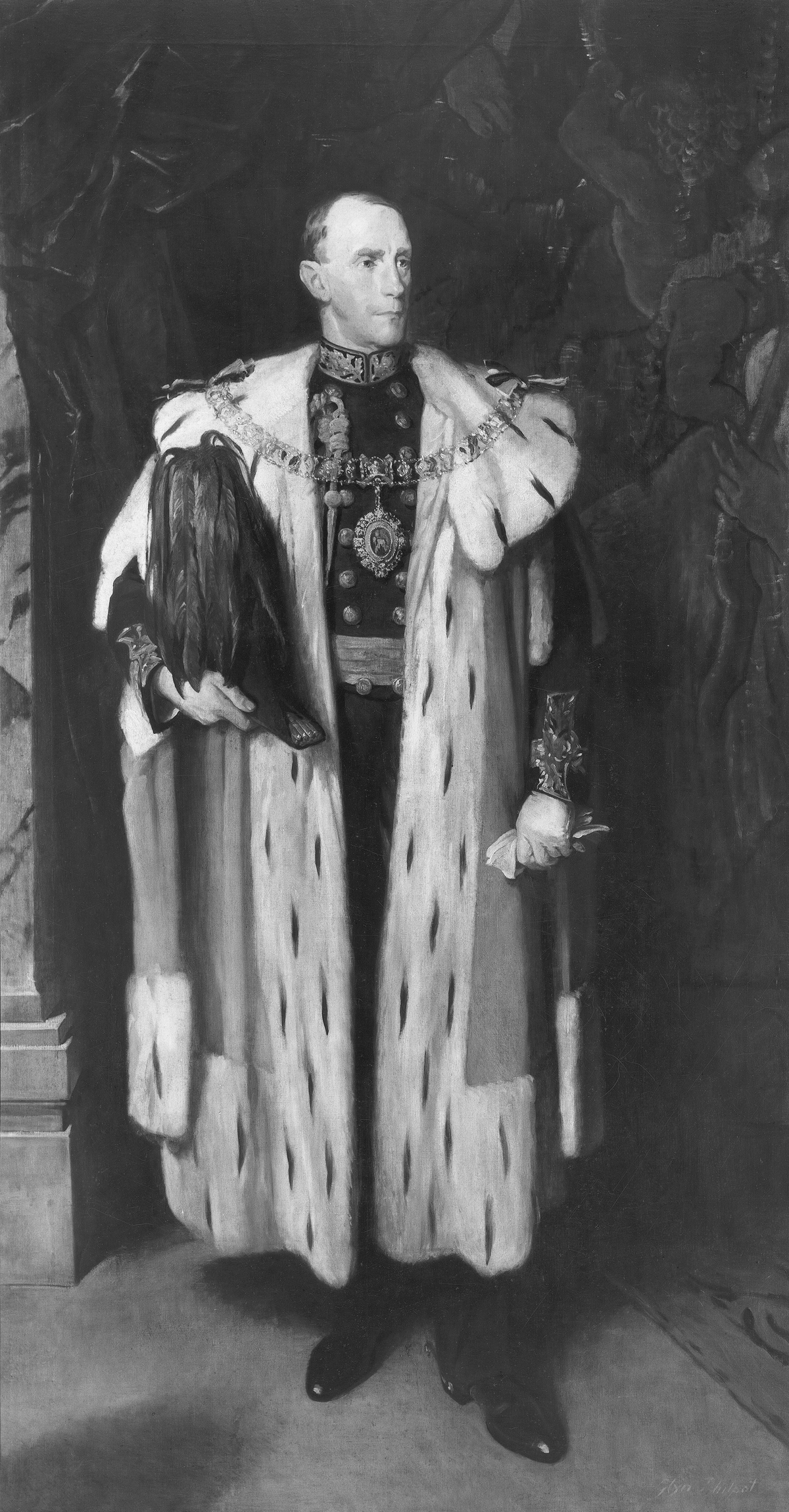
Sir Thomas Hutchison, Lord Provost of Edinburgh (1921–1923); City of Edinburgh Council; by Glyn Philpot

- 1900 Sir James Steel
- 1903 Sir Robert Cranston
- 1906 James Puckering Gibson (Liberal)
- 1909 Sir William Slater Brown
- 1912 Sir Robert Kirk Inches
- 1916 Sir John Lorne MacLeod
- 1919 John William Chesser
- 1921 Sir Thomas Hutchison
- 1923 Sir William Lowrie Sleigh
- 1926 Sir Alexander Stevenson
- 1929 Sir Thomas Barnby Whitson
- 1932 William Johnston Thomson
- 1934 Sir William Johnston Thomson
- 1935 Sir Louis Stewart Gumley
- 1938 Sir Henry Steele
- 1941 Sir William Young Darling
- 1944 Sir John Ireland Falconer
- 1947 Sir Andrew Hunter Arbuthnot Murray (Liberal)
- 1951 Sir James Miller
- 1954 Sir John Garnett Banks
- 1957 Sir Ian Anderson Johnson-Gilbert
- 1960 Sir John Greig Dunbar
- 1963 Sir Duncan Mackay Weatherstone
- 1966 Sir Herbert Archbold Brechin
- 1969 Sir James Wilson McKay
- 1972 Jack Kane (Labour) (first to decline a knighthood)
- 1975 John Millar (Conservative)
- 1977 Kenneth Borthwick (Conservative)
- 1980 Thomas Morgan (Conservative)
- 1984 Dr John McKay (Labour)
- 1988 Eleanor McLaughlin (Labour)
- 1992 Norman Irons (Scottish National Party)
- 1996 Eric Milligan (Labour)

=== 21st century ===
- 2003 Lesley Hinds (Labour)
- 2007 George Grubb (Liberal Democrat)
- 2012 Donald Wilson (Labour)
- 2017 Frank Ross (Scottish National Party)
- 2022 Robert Aldridge (Liberal Democrat)
