= Isobel Hoppar =

Scottish landowner and governess of Margaret Douglas

Isobel Hoppar or Hopper (born c.1490, died after 1538) was a Scottish landowner and governess of Margaret Douglas. She was a powerful political figure in Scotland during the youth of King James V, and her wealth and influence attracted misogynous comment from her faction's enemies.

== Family background ==
Isobel Hoppar was the daughter of an Edinburgh merchant Richard Hoppar. Katrine Hoppar who married Andrew Moubray of Moubray House in Edinburgh was probably her niece. Her family connections are shown in a 1510 property transaction when Katrine Hoppar's father William Hoppar, Isobel's husband John Murray of Barony, and the royal secretary Adam Otterburn husband of Eufamia Moubray, all acted as witnesses together.

Richard Hoppar exported goods to Andrew Halyburton at Middelburg in Zeeland. Andrew Halyburton's surviving ledger mentions Isobel Hoppar's brother, William Hoppar, as Richard Hoppar's's agent and Halyburton's 'gossop' (colleague and relative) in Antwerp and Bergen op Zoom. In September 1498 Richard Hoppar sent wool in a ship belonging to Andrew Barton. Barton returned with silverware destined for Thomas Tod the Provost of Edinburgh, the Archdean of Aberdeen, and 'our Warden'. The case for the silver was paid for by William Hoppar.

'Dik Hoppar', her father, imported velvet and sold fur to James IV of Scotland. In January 1505, Richard handed a newly built house on the north side of the Royal Mile to his other son, Master Henry Hoppar. Richard Hoppar also had a house on the west side of St Mary's Wynd, which was occupied by William Hoppar in 1507, and a part was inherited by his daughter Katrine in 1530.

Richard Hoppar's own dwelling was a 'great mansion'. This house was on the north side of the Royal Mile, behind the 'foreland' on the street front, descending towards the Nor' Loch or Trinity College Kirk passage, was described in 1508 as having hall, chamber and kitchen with lofts and a straight stair running north (called a gallery), over three cellars. The plan was similar to the surviving Moubray House. The tenement building plot had belonged to Patrick Frog.

Isobel's nephew, Katrine's brother, Adam Hopper (d. 1529), was master of the Edinburgh Merchants Guild, established by "seal of cause" in 1518 when it was given the Holy Blood Aisle in St Giles Kirk. A banner of the Holy Blood Confraternity made at this time, the "Fetternear banner" is kept at the National Museum of Scotland. Adam was married to Katherine Bellenden the seamstress of James V of Scotland.

Isobel Hoppar married, before January 1504, Master John Murray of Barony or Blackbarony near Peebles, a clerk of the exchequer, who was killed at Flodden in 1513. In early modern Scotland married women did not usually adopt their husband's surnames.

== Rise and fall of the Douglases ==
After John Murray's death at Flodden, Isobel Hoppar was described as a "rich widow of Edinburgh" in 1515 by Baron Dacre. Isobel's second husband was Archibald Douglas of Kilspindie, called Greysteil, brother and advisor of the Archibald Douglas, 6th Earl of Angus. By the King's gift in 1526, Archibald Douglas of Kilspindie and Isobel Hoppar were given another property on the south side of the High Street, when Kilspindie was Lord High Treasurer and Provost of Edinburgh. The house had belonged to Isobel's former husband and to James Forstar or Forrester, son of Jonet Halyburton and a grandson of Sir Duncan Forrester of Garden. She was given rights of the property of James, Lord Carlyle of Torthorwald in January 1527.

At this time the Earl of Angus had gained sole custody of the young James V, and the power and influence of the Angus Red Douglases was at its height. In 1527 Isobel as "executrice" of her husband received £100 for an old royal debt owed to Murray. Her contemporary, the Jedburgh monk Adam Abell reflected on the career of Kilspindies' wife at this time in his chronicle The Roit and Quheil of Tyme. He was surprised by her involvement in public affairs, and he claimed that her influence and manners had had a negative effect on the Earl of Angus;

"His pridefull wife Dik Oppar's douchter of Edinburgh wes callit my lady thesaurer, and it is saide sche wes ane compositor in the justice airis. And the common voice is that had not been hir heichness (haughtiness), the noble erll of Anguss had been peaceably now in Scotland."

Isobel Hoppar was a childhood companion or governess of Margaret Douglas the daughter of Margaret Tudor and the Earl of Angus, and mother of Henry Stuart, Lord Darnley.

When James V reached his majority and escaped from the Douglases in 1528, he began to take revenge on the Douglas family. Archibald and Isobel lost the Forrester house, and the lands she held near Peebles. On Saturday 5 September 1528 the Earl of Angus shouted over the Tweed to the Earl of Northumberland's steward Roger Lassells that he should expect them and the young Earl of Huntly as refugees at Norham Castle. If his family was forced into exile, Lassels would provide a chamber at Norham for Margaret Douglas, and Isobel Hoppar would wait on her. Margaret was delivered to England at Norham in October. Isobel continued to serve her great-niece Margaret as her "gentlewoman" at Berwick Castle.

The English diplomat Thomas Magnus noted that Isobel was a powerful character in the Douglas family dynamic. He wrote, sharing the opinion of the 'common voice' recorded by Adam Abell, that Isobel "totally ordoured" Kilspindie, and in turn Kilspindie and George Douglas had brought the Earl of Angus to his troubles;

"the Erle of Angus was ... I suppoos of trouth, totally ordoured not of hym self but by his frendes, and specially by George his broder, as is Archebalde by his wiff. Which twayne, by reporte, have brought thaym all to this trouble and busyness."

Kilspindie's Edinburgh house was given to the new royal treasurer Robert Cairncross. In February 1529 Isobel's lands at Staneburn near Linlithgow were given to Gavin Hamilton, and her rents, crops, and livestock at Blackbarony and 'Puro' (which she held conjointly with her husband) were given to Patrick Hepburn of Wauchtoun.

Isobel was described as Kilspindie's widow in 1536. In 1538 she was pursuing a legal dispute with James Spens, a servant of James V. The King asked the judges to delay proceedings until he gave his personal opinion. The lawyer acting for Isobel as her 'procurator' was Hugh Rig of Carberry, whose wife, Janet Hoppar, was Isobel's niece.

== Children ==
Isobel's children included;

- Andrew Murray of Blackbarony (d.1572), married Elizabeth Lockhart, and secondly Grisel Beaton the mother of Gideon Murray.
- Archibald Douglas of Kilspindie II, Provost of Edinburgh in 1554, 1559 and 1562.
