= Kilspindie Castle =

Coordinates: 56.0102°N 2.8648°W

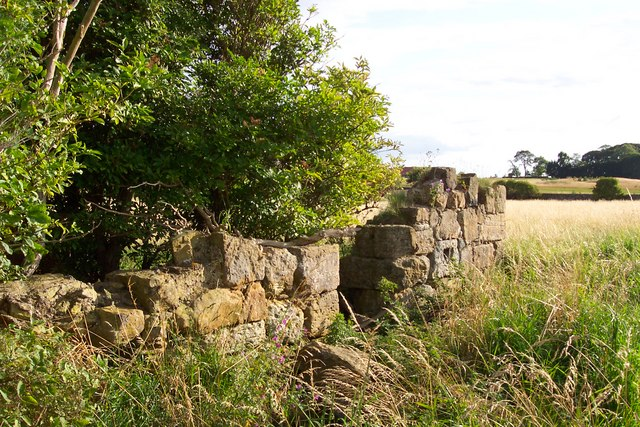
Remains of Kilspindie Castle

Kilspindie Castle lies north of the village of Aberlady, in East Lothian, Scotland; the remains of the castle are behind the Victorian St Mary's Kirk. An early castle was destroyed in the 16th century, and the rebuilt tower was pulled down by the 18th century. Little more than a few scattered stones of the base of a doorway with a length of wall punctuated by oval gun loops remain. The area is protected as a scheduled monument. Another ruin called "Kilspindie Castle" was at Butterdean near Coldingham.

== History ==
=== Early history ===
Metal finds from the site indicate its continuous occupation since earliest times. It has yielded the single largest concentration of Anglo-Saxon finds yet recorded in Scotland.

=== Clan Douglas ===
An early fortalice was held by the Spens, or Spence, family, possibly vassals of their over lord, the Gospatric Earls of Dunbar. The Douglas family acquired Kilspindie around the start of the 16th century when, in a feud with Spens of Kilspindie, Archibald "Bell-the-cat", 5th Earl of Angus, tore off Spens' leg with one stroke of his great sword. The Douglas family came into ownership of the lands of Aberlady through rights bestowed by the Crown and Gavin Douglas, Bishop of Dunkeld, perhaps indicating a transfer of the name Kilspindie from the village of the same name in Perthshire. Later use by Sir Archibald Douglas of Kilspindie of the title "Greysteil" may refer to the sword stroke used to obtain the lands of Kilspindie. The earl's fourth son by a second marriage was made Lord Treasurer of Scotland from 1520 to 1528.

Kilspindie survived the sackings of the wars of the Rough Wooing during the 1540s, when castles, abbeys and villages throughout the Lothians and Borders were stormed, sacked and burnt. The English invaders had avoided assaulting Tantallon, home of the earl of Angus, and Hugh Douglas's Longniddry Tower because Hugh was an "assured Scot", perhaps showing English diplomacy to protect Douglas interests in the Lothians.

However, in 1547, the English returned to the Lothians, defeating the Scots army at the battle of Pinkie, near Musselburgh. The following year they established a fort at Haddington and sacked nearby castles. Luffness was destroyed to enable English supplies to be landed unchallenged in Haddington. It is likely that Kilspindie was also destroyed because of its position on Aberlady Bay.

=== A new castle ===
Patrick Douglas of Kilspindie built a new "castell toure and fortalice" before 1600, perhaps as early as 1558. This was thought to have been oblong in plan. It seems probable that the castle would have been surrounded by an enclosing barmkin wall with gatehouse protecting stables, brewhouse, barns, etc. The barmkin in turn would have been surrounded by a deep ditch, filled by the tide and trapped there by wooden dams when the tide withdrew. Also, the land around must have been a tidal salt marsh, which would have added to the defensive position.

By 1612, Kilspindie was granted to Alexander Hay through his marriage on 16 January 1582 to Patrick's widow. Kilspindie is not mentioned during Oliver Cromwell's sacking of Lothian castles in the 1650s but by the 18th century it had already been demolished for building material elsewhere in Aberlady. A number of large stones that belonged to the house have been built into the boundary walls of the fields and road leading to the golf course. A heavy studded door from the structure is now located within Luffness House.
