= Archibald Douglas of Kilspindie =

Scottish nobleman

Sir Archibald Douglas of Kilspindie (c. 1475 – bef. 1536), also known as Greysteil, was a Scottish nobleman and courtier, who served as Treasurer of Scotland, and was thrice Provost of Edinburgh.

== Life ==
=== Rise ===
Kilspindie was the fourth son of Archibald Douglas, 5th Earl of Angus, and his second wife, Elizabeth Boyd, herself a daughter of Robert Boyd, 1st Lord Boyd.

In 1513, Kilspindie's two older brothers were killed at the Battle of Flodden, along with King James IV. His nephew, Archibald Douglas, 6th Earl of Angus married the King's widow, Margaret Tudor, and was regent for the young King James V, during this time Kilspindie became very popular with the boy-king, who knew him as Greysteil, the name of the subject of a popular ballad of the time. Kilspindie married Isobel Hoppar, described in 1515 as a "rich widow of Edinburgh" by Baron Dacre.

While the Douglas family were in power, Kilspindie became Lord High Treasurer of Scotland. He was Provost of Edinburgh in 1526, when the King granted him and his wife, Isobel Hopper, a tenement on the south side of Edinburgh's Netherbow. Adam Otterburn picked up the deeds of the house which had belonged to Philip Forrester and lay within Andrew Moubray's property. Andrew Moubray was married to Isobel Hoppar's niece, Katrine Hoppar. They built Moubray House on the north side of the street which still survives in part.

=== Fall ===
The King escaped from Angus's control in May 1528. According to the chronicle history by Robert Lindsay of Pitscottie, James V escaped from the Douglas family at Falkland Palace, riding to Stirling Castle while Kilspindie was visiting his mistress at Dundee. Finding the King had fled, he rode to Stirling with his nephew George Douglas of Pittendreich but the King's herald was in place on the bridge to demand they desist from approaching the King.

Kilspindie and the Douglas family were condemned for treason and their lands forfeited at the September 1528 Parliament of Scotland. The King gave Kilspindie's tenement in Edinburgh to the new Treasurer, Robert Cairncross. Lands in Cunninghame went to Robert, Lord Maxwell, and Reidside near Tantallon Castle was given to Hugh Johnson, the King's cook. The Douglases were already on the Scottish borders or in exile in England, and James laid siege to their castle at Tantallon. On 5 September 1528 the Earl of Angus shouted over the Tweed to the Earl of Northumberland's steward that if his family was forced into exile at Norham Castle, Isobel Hoppar would wait on Margaret Douglas. Margaret crossed the Tweed to Norham in October. The English diplomat Thomas Magnus believed that Isobel was a significant factor in events, writing to Cardinal Wolsey in November:

"the Erle of Angus ... I suppoos of trouth, totally ordoured not of hym self but by his frendes, and specially by George his broder, as is Archebalde by his wiff. Which twayne, by reaporte, have brought thaym all to this trouble and busyness."

In November Thomas Magnus heard that James Hamilton of Finnart and the Sheriff of Ayr, despite being two "cherished servants" and counsellors of James V, had met the forfeited rebels Kilspindie and George Douglas of Pittendreich at Cockburnspath to discuss the restoration of the Earldom of Angus. In December 1528 Dr Magnus heard a rumour that the merchant communities of Veere and Middelburg had tried to contact Kilspindie before his forfeit, to ask him to support a marriage between James V and a sister or close relation of Charles V, Holy Roman Emperor. Isobel's son by her first marriage, Andrew Murray of Blackbarony, was officially forgiven for helping Archibald and Isobel in April 1542.

A later history of the family by David Hume of Godscroft has Kilspindie returning to Scotland 10 years later. He approached the King at the Royal Park of Stirling. The King recognised him but ignored him and rode up the hill to the Castle. Kilspindie, though wearing concealed chain-mail, followed on foot and arrived exhausted at the same time, but no-one would give him a drink since James had shown him no favour. He then went to France on the King's orders.

== Family ==
His wife Isobel Hoppar was described in legal documents as his widow in 1536.

Their son and heir Archibald Douglas, succeeded as Laird of Kilspindie in 1543 following a reversal of his family's forfeiture, and also went on to be Provost of Edinburgh three times: 1554–1557, 1559-1562 and 1562–1565.

== Sources ==
- Fraser, Sir William, The Douglas Book IV vols, Edinburgh 1885
