= Moubray House =

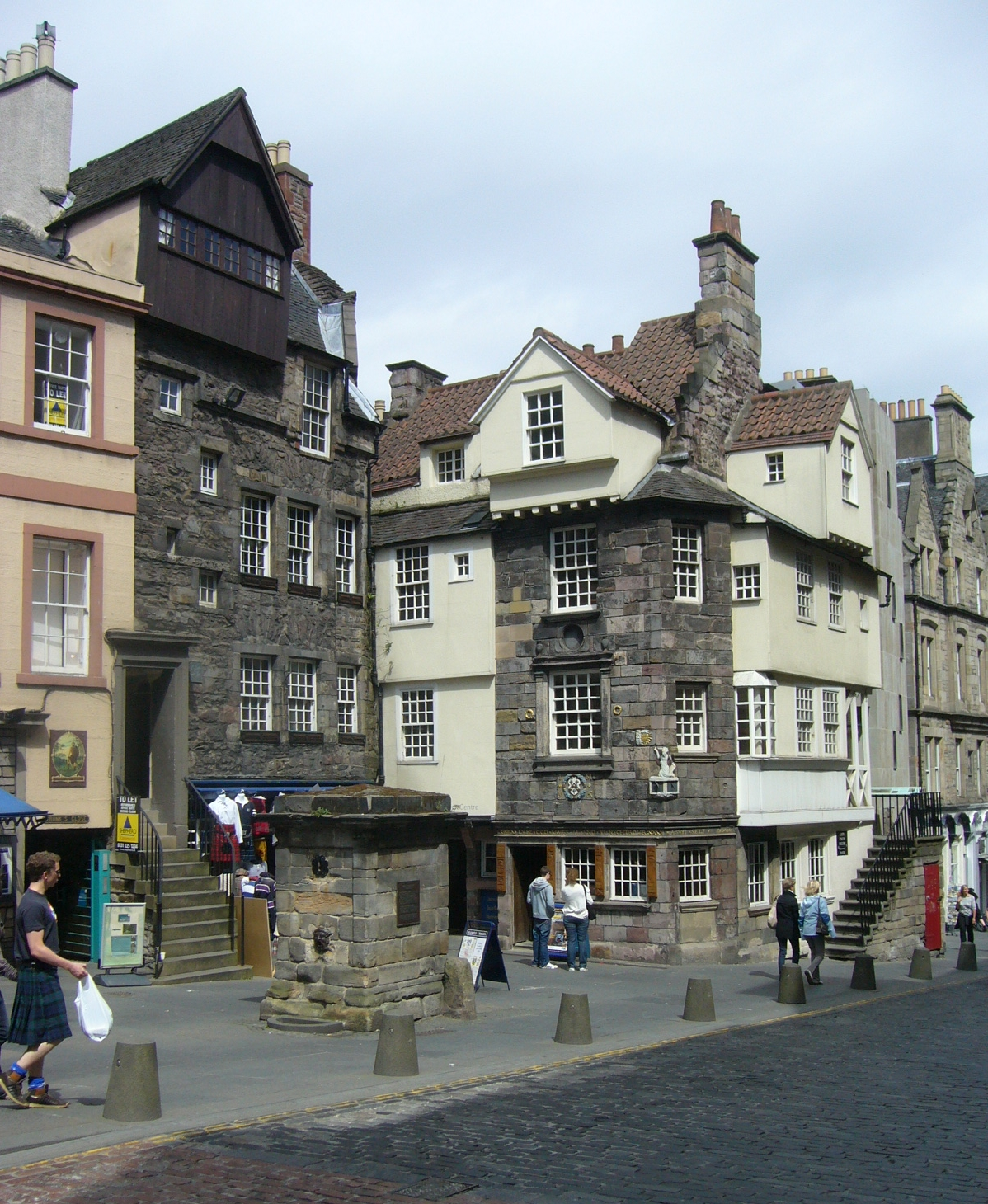
- Moubray House (to the left) and John Knox House on the High Street, near the Netherbow Port, on the Royal Mile, Edinburgh.

- Location within Edinburgh city centre
- 55°57′2.520″N 3°11′6.828″W
- Location: Royal Mile, Edinburgh, Scotland
- OS grid reference: NT 26084 73709

History
- Built: c. 1477
- Built for: Robert Moubray

Site notes
- Restored: 1910, 1970s
- Restored by: Nicholas Groves-Raines
- Owner: Debra Stonecipher

Listed Building – Category A

Moubray House, 51 and 53 High Street, is one of the oldest buildings on the Royal Mile, and one of the oldest occupied residential buildings in Edinburgh, Scotland. The façade dates from the early 17th century, built on foundations laid c. 1477.

The tenement is noted for its interiors, including a Renaissance board-and-beam painted ceiling discovered in 1999, a plaster ceiling with exotic fruit and flower mouldings with the arms of Pringle of Galashiels (five escallops on a saltire) dated 1650 painted on the wall, and a wooden barrel-vaulted attic apartment which is expressed on the roofline.

Persons associated with the house include Scotland's first eminent portrait painter George Jamesone, the English spy and writer Daniel Defoe, who was instrumental in the passing of the 1707 Act of Union with England, and Archibald Constable, proprietor of the Encyclopædia Britannica.

Moubray House is designated a Category A listed building by Historic Scotland.

== Description ==
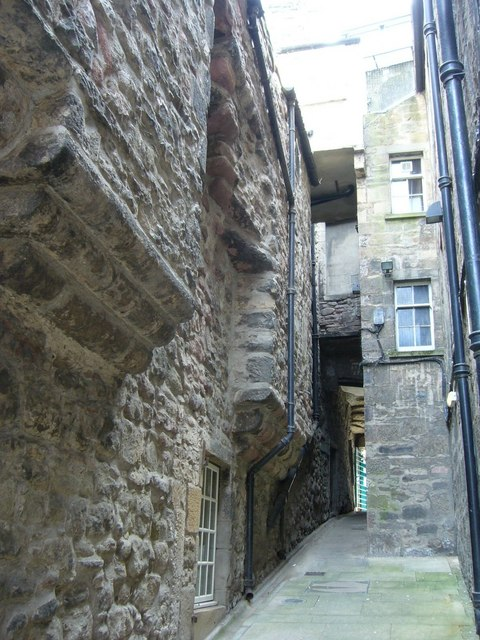
Trunk's Close, with the 1529 'back-land' of Moubray House on the left, with its corbelled projections for stairs

Moubray House lies on the north side of the High Street, between Trunk's or Turing's Close and the John Knox House, near the site of Edinburgh's Netherbow Port, the main gate into Edinburgh before its demolition in 1764. On the pavement in front of the property survives the Netherbow Well, one of the wells which formerly supplied water for the Old Town.

In its origins, the tenement is a rare survivor of the Burning of Edinburgh in 1544, when Henry VIII of England ordered the Earl of Hertford to "put all to fire and sword, burn Edinburgh town". In Trunk's close, over a stone vaulted basement, can be seen "massive corbelled projections" which contained straight flights of stairs serving the north wing, perhaps part of Adam Moubray (III)'s building of 1529 and its extension. One of these stairs rises from the first-floor hall of this "back-land," where a later sixteenth-century painted ceiling of "exceptional quality" was discovered in 1999. This room is lit by a row of windows facing east.

=== The Moubrays ===
In 1369, the three houses here all belonged to the Turing family, whose name is remembered as "Trunk's Close." The present site was laid out c.1472-7, after reconstruction of the Netherbow Port close to "John Knox's House" by Alexander Bonkill. The street frontage of Moubray House retains the line of the earlier medieval High Street, being the last house east before the defensive narrowing at the gate. The "John Knox House" is on the site of one of four houses built in the new narrow passage to the gate. During the 16th century the tenement was identified as Andrew Moubray's house in legal records. There were three Andrew Moubrays, although the original builder is called "Robert Moubray" in many sources. The part of house at the back was probably built around 1529 by the third Andrew Moubray (III) and his wife Katrine Hoppar. The plots on Edinburgh High Street were called "lands." The buildings could be divided into "fore, mid, and back-lands." These could also be divided in storeys, leading to complicated patterns of ownership and tenancy.

These were wealthy and well-connected merchant families, and the Moubrays owned other properties in Edinburgh. In 1494 Andrew Moubray (I) disputed the rent of another house he owned in Leith with his tenant the sailor Robert Barton. Andrew Moubray (I), a second son, was made a burgess of Edinburgh in 1451, his fee pledged by the Baillie James Bonkill. As a merchant, he supplied cloths and sheets to Margaret of Denmark, Queen of Scotland to line her bath tub. On 18 August 1482, jointly with Laurence Taillefer, Moubray was appointed "Customar of Edinburgh", the collector of royal rents and duties owed by the town to the King. Andrew Moubray (I) bought the lands of Kirktonhill in Lauderdale from William Moubray in 1486, and with his wife Elizabeth endowed a chaplain at the altar of St Ninian in St Giles Kirk in 1478 and 1492. Their grandson, Andrew Moubray (III) was still patron of the altar in 1533. Their daughter, Agnes Moubray was married to the merchant Patrick Cant by 1492.

The Moubrays main business was textiles and Andrew Moubray (II) sold fine cloth to King James IV in 1496, accepting a gilt cup as payment. Some of his mercantile activity in the Netherlands in the 1490s was recorded in the shipping Ledger of Andrew Halyburton, which records his trip to Middelburg and his cargoes carried by Andrew Barton. Andrew Moubray (II) exported wool and imported wine and furs. Laurence Taillefer, Andrew's partner as Customar of Edinburgh was married to Helen, the sister of Andrew Halyburton. He was also joint owner of the 60 ton James of Leith and had a licence from Henry VII to sell fish in England in 1490.

Andrew (II) married Jonet Halyburton, whose brothers James and David Halyburton were soldiers of the Garde Écossaise. When Andrew Moubray (II) died in 1499, his children were still minors, so James IV gave his property to Patrick Halyburton until they came of age. Andrew Moubray (III) sold a crossbow to James V in 1527.

=== Andrew Moubray (III) and the Hoppar family ===
Moubray House in November 2026

Andrew Moubray (III) married Katrine Hoppar, daughter of William Hoppar and Elizabeth Carkettill. William Hoppar supplied a chest for the royal wardrobe on the day that Margaret Tudor arrived in Edinburgh. Hoppar and Adam Carkettil were members of the religious confraternity of the Holy Blood, and witnessed the censure of the poet and priest Gavin Douglas when the mass on 27 February 1511 was not properly performed. His son, Adam Hopper was master of the Edinburgh Merchants Guild, established by "seal of cause" in 1518 when it was given the Holy Blood Aisle in St Giles Kirk. A banner of the confraternity made at this time, the "Fetternear banner" is kept at the National Museum of Scotland. Adam Hoppar (d.1529), Katrine's brother, was married to Katherine Bellenden the seamstress of James V of Scotland.

Katrine Hoppar had a relation, probably an aunt, Isobel Hoppar, the daughter of Richard Hoppar. Isobel's first husband was Master John Murray of Black Barony, a clerk of the exchequer, who was killed at Flodden. In 1515 Isobel Hoppar was described as a "rich widow of Edinburgh" by Baron Dacre. Isobel's second husband was Archibald Douglas of Kilspindie, called Greysteil, brother and advisor of the Earl of Angus. By the King's gift in 1526, Archibald Douglas of Kilspindie and Isobel Hoppar were given another property on the south side of the High Street, when Kilspindie was Lord High Treasurer and Provost of Edinburgh. The house had belonged to Isobel's former husband and to James Forstar or Forrester, son of Jonet Halyburton and a grandson of Sir Duncan Forrester of Garden.

Archibald and Isobel lost the Forrester house, and the lands she held near Peebles when James V reached his majority and escaped from the Douglases. On 5 September 1528 the Earl of Angus shouted over the Tweed to the Earl of Northumberland's steward that if his family was forced into exile at Norham Castle, Isobel Hoppar would wait on his daughter Margaret Douglas. Isobel continued to serve Margaret as her "gentlewoman" at Berwick Castle. The English diplomat Thomas Magnus wrote that Isobel "totally ordoured" Kilspindie, and in turn Kilspindie and George Douglas had brought the Earl of Angus to his troubles. Kilspindie's house was given to the new treasurer Robert Cairncross.

Katrine's sister Janet was married to Hugh Rig of Carberry, a lawyer who acted for Isobel Hoppar after Kilspindie's death, and was said to have been an advisor and flatterer of Regent Arran before the battle of Pinkie. George Buchanan wrote that Hugh was notable more for his large size and strength than his knowledge of military tactics. Elizabeth Hoppar, perhaps Katherine Bellenden's daughter, was married to Patrick Tennent of Cairns, the brother of the King's servant and yeoman of the crossbow, John Tennent. She had four daughters. Eufamia Moubray, probably a sister of Andrew (III), was married to the diplomat and king's advocate Adam Otterburn.

Andrew Moubray (III) also had two properties on the opposite side of the road to Moubray House, one near a tennis court called a "caichpule", the other next to the house given to Kilspindie. In 1541, Katherine Bellenden, now married to Oliver Sinclair, with John Tennent and other kin who served the royal household donated an adjacent property to the west of Moubray House for a chantry in St Giles and various charities.

Also in 1541, Andrew Mowbray (III) travelled to Middelburg as commissioner for the city of Edinburgh to negotiate a trade agreement with Maximilian II of Burgundy. Maximilian was prompted to fix the centre for Scottish trade at Veere. Andrew was sent to Flanders again in 1544, carrying a letter of accreditation describing in French the 'great and ancient amity between Scotland and Flanders.' With the Scottish ambassador, he spoke at a meeting in Antwerp with officials and representatives of the Lord of Beveren in April 1545.

Andrew Moubray (III) died in 1545 in Flanders. His eldest son Edward Moubray was still a minor. John Danielstoun, Parson of Dysart was appointed guardian of Edward Moubray (who died young). Andrew had left some possessions in Veere and Middelburg, which were passed to his executor there, Andrew Cupar. During the war known as the "Rough Wooing", his widow Katrine Hoppar (died 1551) supplied iron from Gdańsk for entrenching tools sent to Jedburgh in February 1549. In 1550 she was refunded money that she had contributed for the "Raid of the Borrowmure", an abandoned military action planned for the Siege of Haddington.

=== Robert Moubray, John Knox, and the Pringles ===
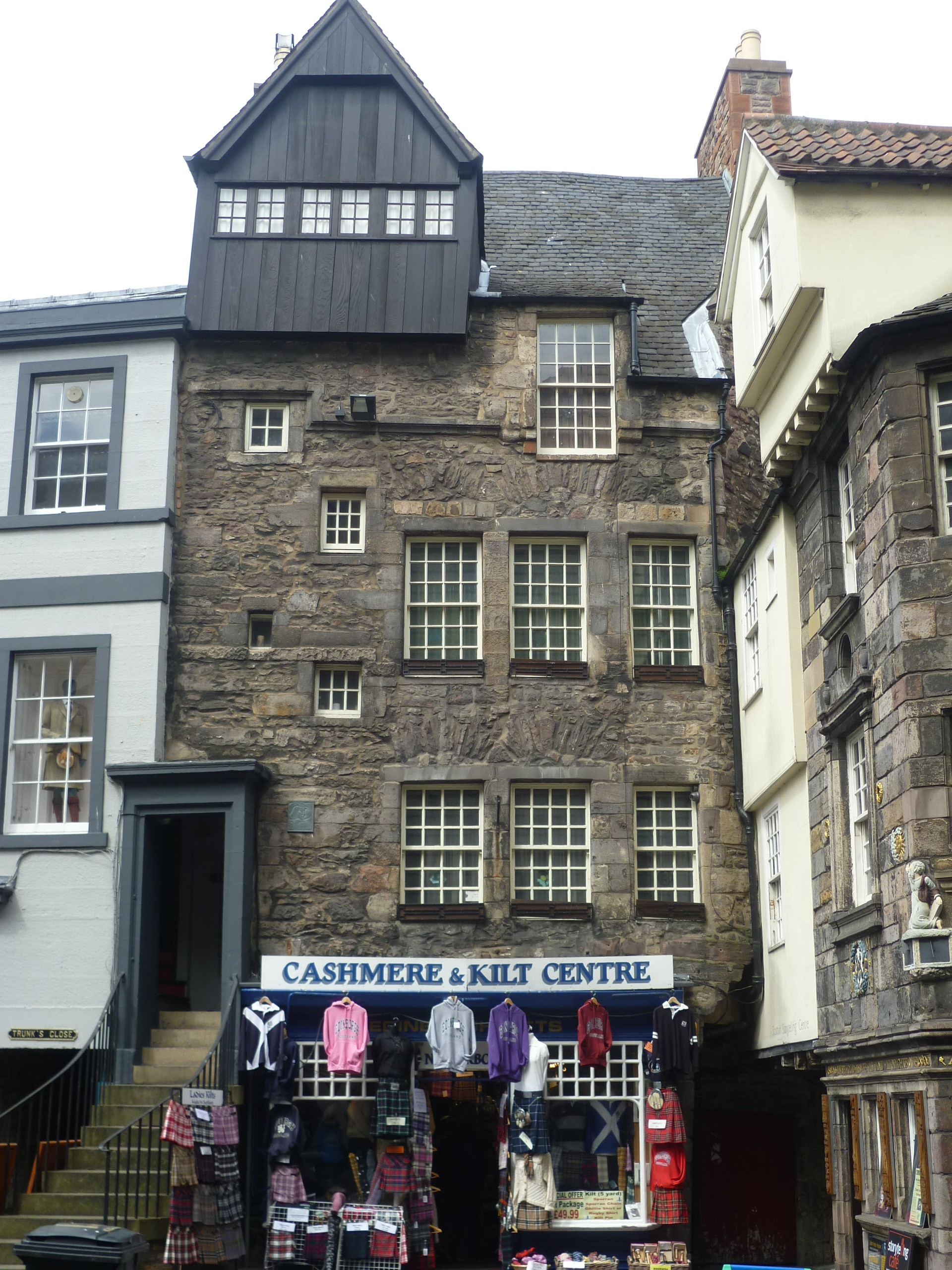
Moubray House

Robert Moubray, a son of Andrew (III) and Katrine Hoppar inherited the house when he came of age. In the 1560s he let another property, which he had inherited from his grandmother Elizabeth Carkettill, to the town council for the use of John Knox. which, it has been suggested, had grounds which backed onto the Nor' Loch and was in the area of Warriston's Close, west of Edinburgh City Chambers and close to St Giles. The Moubray House and "John Knox House" grounds would have backed onto Trinity College Kirk. The adjacent house to the west of this Warriston's close property had belonged to Richard Hoppar, the father of Isobel Hoppar.

Within this other house, the Town Council provided John Knox with a "warm study of deals" against the winter of 1561. In March 1565, Robert Moubray exchanged the house occupied by John Knox with the lawyer Robert Scott for a loan. Robert had a baker as his tenant in the shop of another house on the south side of the street.

During the "Lang Siege" of Edinburgh Castle, when William Kirkcaldy of Grange bombarded the town, Robert Moubray and his family left Edinburgh and moved to Leith for safety. When the siege was concluded and the burgesses were required to return, in November 1573 the Town Council granted his wish to remain in Leith over the winter because his wife, Janet Cant, was ill. Janet outlived him, and died in 1592.

At some point in the last decades of the 16th-century, James Hoppringle or Pringle of Whytbank and Woodhead and his wife Mariota Murray became owners of the Netherbow House. In November 1595, their son, James Pringle of Whytbank made a successful plea to the Privy Council on behalf of seven schoolchildren who had been imprisoned following the shooting of Baillie John MacMorran. His son, also James Pringle, served in the Garde Écossaise and married Sophia Schöner, a daughter of Anne of Denmark's physician Martin Schöner in 1622. James Pringle was fined by Parliament for his support of Charles I in 1646.

== 17th and 18th-century ==
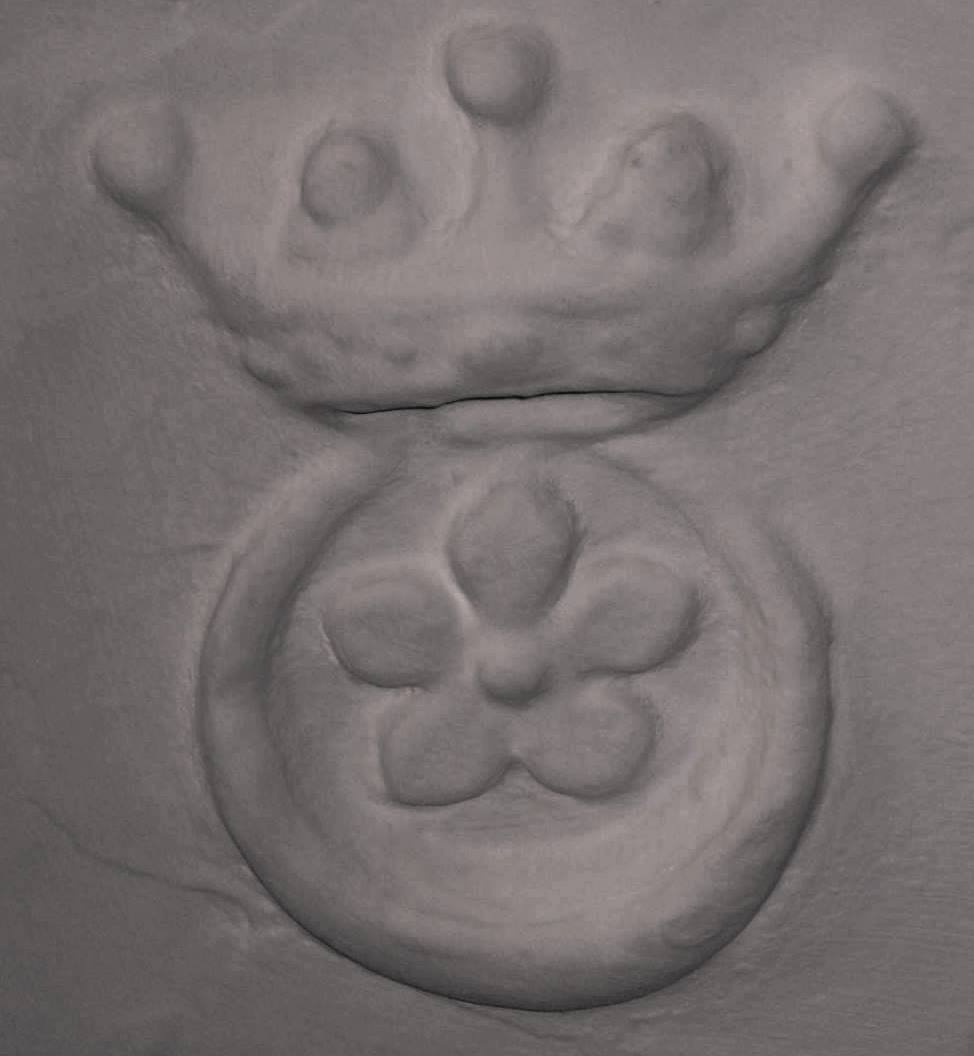
Heraldic cipher of Alexander Seton, 1st Earl of Dunfermline on a first floor ceiling of Moubray House

The stone Royal Mile façade dates from around 1630. There is a moulded plaster ceiling of this era in the second-floor front room, which includes the Seton heraldic badge of crescent and cinquefoil, and royal emblems of England and Scotland. The painted Pringle coat of arms of the wall in this room may indicate that Jean Pringle of Galashiels lived here, who was traditionally identified as the "black eyed lass o' Galasheils" in the ballad "Gala Water." However, Robert Pringle of Howlatson (Howliston) inherited the right to this heraldry in 1650, the date of the painting, which passed in 1653 to Pringle of Whytbank and Yair.

The painter George Jamesone lived in the property. Daniel Defoe edited the Edinburgh Courant newspaper from the house in 1710. In the 18th century the building housed a tavern, and until 1822 the shop on the street front was the premises of the publisher and bookseller Archibald Constable, proprietor of the Scots Magazine, the Edinburgh Review and the Encyclopædia Britannica. A more recent publishing connection is with Moubray House Press, later Moubray House Publishing, which was established here in 1984 before moving across the High Street to premises in Tweeddale Court.

== Recent restorations and future plans ==
Moubray House was restored by the Cockburn Association in 1910, and in the 1970s by the architect Nicholas Groves-Raines. In the mid-1900s, Moubray House was the home and shop of an antiques dealer, Esta Henry. American benefactors, Harry and Debra Stonecipher acquired the various sub-divided flats and further restored the house and gave it to the nation, in trust to Historic Scotland in 2012.

== See also ==
- Scottish Renaissance painted ceilings
- Clan Pringle
