= List of listed buildings in Edinburgh/28 =

This is a list of listed buildings in Edinburgh, Scotland.

== List ==
Name	Location	Date Listed	Grid Ref. (Note: Sometimes known as OSGB36, the grid reference (where provided) is based on the British national grid reference system used by the Ordnance Survey. • "Guide to National Grid". Ordnance Survey. • "Get-a-map". Ordnance Survey.)	Geo-coordinates	Notes	LB Number (Note: Historic Environment Scotland assign a unique alphanumeric identifier to each designated site in Scotland, for listed buildings this always begins with "LB", for example "LB12345".)	Image
20-24 (Even Nos) Warrender Park Road				55°56′17″N 3°11′33″W	Category B	30490	Upload another image
5-9 (Inclusive Nos)Alvanley Terrace				55°56′16″N 3°12′11″W	Category B	30495	Upload Photo
27 Lauder Road, Kenneth Mackenzie House With Gatepiers And Boundary Walls				55°56′05″N 3°11′11″W	Category B	30405	Upload Photo
29 Lauder Road With Conservatory And Gatepiers				55°56′06″N 3°11′11″W	Category B	30406	Upload Photo
46 Lauder Road				55°56′13″N 3°11′19″W	Category C(S)	30419	Upload Photo
48 And 48A Lauder Road				55°56′14″N 3°11′19″W	Category C(S)	30420	Upload Photo
29 Mansionhouse Road, Pepper				55°56′06″N 3°11′21″W	Category B	30423	Upload Photo
33 Mansionhouse Road				55°56′05″N 3°11′19″W	Category C(S)	30425	Upload Photo
43 Mansionhouse Road				55°56′01″N 3°11′17″W	Category B	30427	Upload Photo
32-36 And 38-42 (Even Nos) Marchmont Crescent				55°56′15″N 3°11′34″W	Category B	30433	Upload another image
74-78 Marchmont Crescent				55°56′12″N 3°11′36″W	Category B	30439	Upload another image
77-81 (Odd Nos) Marchmont Road				55°56′10″N 3°11′38″W	Category B	30443	Upload another image
97 Lanark Road, Former Lodge				55°55′13″N 3°15′12″W	Category C(S)	30321	Upload Photo
Albion Place, Lockhart Memorial Church, With Hall, Boundary Walls And Railings				55°57′42″N 3°10′01″W	Category B	30324	Upload Photo
35-39 (Inclusive Nos) Argyle Place				55°56′21″N 3°11′30″W	Category B	30340	Upload another image
40-43 (Inclusive Nos) Argyle Place				55°56′22″N 3°11′30″W	Category B	30341	Upload another image
57 Dick Place				55°55′59″N 3°11′31″W	Category C(S)	30355	Upload Photo
6 Dick Place, St Margaret's Nursing Home				55°56′04″N 3°10′56″W	Category B	30359	Upload another image
38 Dick Place, Grange Park House, Formerly Egremont				55°55′57″N 3°11′22″W	Category A	30365	Upload Photo
1 And 3 Barnshot Road, With Boundary Wall And Gates				55°54′23″N 3°15′22″W	Category C(S)	30224	Upload Photo
35-43 (Odd Nos) Causewayside, Garage				55°56′19″N 3°10′53″W	Category B	30227	Upload another image
Cowgate, Near The Pleasance, Police Box				55°56′57″N 3°11′02″W	Category B	30240	Upload another image
Drumsheugh Gardens At Queensferry Road, Police Box				55°57′05″N 3°12′47″W	Category B	30242	Upload Photo
13-17 (Odd Nos) Murrayfield Drive, Balnagowan, Including Boundary Walls, Gatepiers And Gates				55°56′50″N 3°14′41″W	Category A	30251	Upload another image
Cammo Road, Cammo Estate, Walled Garden, Gate Piers, Out Buildings & Bee- Boles (Off Cammo Walk)				55°57′20″N 3°19′31″W	Category C(S)	30261	Upload Photo
Cammo Road, Cammo Estate, Bridge Including Quadrant Walls, And Estate Boundary Walls				55°57′35″N 3°19′07″W	Category B	30262	Upload Photo
78 The Pleasance				55°56′51″N 3°10′55″W	Category C(S)	30144	Upload Photo
Roseburn Cliff, 1-3 (Inclusive Nos) George Pape's Widows' Cottages				55°56′45″N 3°14′06″W	Category C(S)	30152	Upload Photo
28 St Andrew Square With Balustrading, Scottish Equitable				55°57′19″N 3°11′35″W	Category A	30160	Upload another image
89-95 (Odd Nos) Shandwick Place				55°56′56″N 3°12′37″W	Category C(S)	30178	Upload Photo
22-30 (Even Numbers) Shandwick Place				55°57′00″N 3°12′34″W	Category C(S)	30181	Upload Photo
30 York Road. Woodbine Cottage, With Boundary Wall				55°58′43″N 3°12′12″W	Category B	30197	Upload Photo
1A Duddingston Park, Former Janitor`S House				55°56′56″N 3°07′10″W	Category C(S)	30208	Upload Photo
24 (Heritage Museum) And 25 (Restaurant) Pier Place, Newhaven Fishmarket				55°58′55″N 3°11′41″W	Category B	30221	Upload Photo
Carrington Road, Fettes College, Carrington House				55°57′43″N 3°13′37″W	Category B	30222	Upload Photo
Craiglockhart Dell East Grotto				55°55′09″N 3°15′01″W	Category B	30056	Upload Photo
28 And 30 Broughton Street				55°57′28″N 3°11′22″W	Category B	30068	Upload Photo
Cluny Gardens 1 Royal Bank Of Scotland				55°55′30″N 3°12′32″W	Category B	30078	Upload Photo
41-45 (Odd Nos) Cockburn Street				55°57′03″N 3°11′22″W	Category B	30081	Upload Photo
59-63 (Odd Nos) Cockburn Street				55°57′03″N 3°11′20″W	Category B	30084	Upload Photo
2 And 4 Cockburn Street And 18-21 (Inclusive Nos) Market Street, Including Former Boiler House Adjoining To Rear And Former Printing Works And Offices To E Of Advocate's Close				55°57′02″N 3°11′30″W	Category B	30085	Upload Photo
42-46 (Even Nos) Cockburn Street				55°57′02″N 3°11′20″W	Category B	30091	Upload another image
48 Cockburn Street				55°57′01″N 3°11′20″W	Category B	30092	Upload another image
50 Cockburn Street				55°57′01″N 3°11′19″W	Category B	30093	Upload Photo
174 Granton Road And 2 Wardie Crescent, Grantons Including Gatepiers And Boundary Wall				55°58′41″N 3°13′01″W	Category B	30111	Upload Photo
41-47 (Odd Nos) Lothian Street				55°56′47″N 3°11′21″W	Category B	30136	Upload Photo
53-55 (Odd Nos) York Place, Including Railings				55°57′23″N 3°11′19″W	Category A	29971	Upload Photo
5 York Road, With Boundary Wall And Gatepiers				55°58′35″N 3°12′11″W	Category B	29995	Upload Photo
James Craig Walk And Princes Street, General Register House Sasine Office				55°57′16″N 3°11′22″W	Category B	30026	Upload Photo
18-22 (Even Nos) Greenside Place, The Playhouse Theatre				55°57′24″N 3°11′05″W	Category A	30029	Upload another image
7-8 Chambers Street, Former Police Training School				55°56′54″N 3°11′15″W	Category C(S)	30030	Upload Photo
1 Lauriston Place, Royal Infirmary Forecourt, Statue Of George Ii				55°56′41″N 3°11′35″W	Category A	30033	Upload Photo
94-96 (Even Nos) West Bow				55°56′54″N 3°11′40″W	Category B	29908	Upload Photo
5 West Coates, Including Boundary Walls, Obelisk And Gate Piers				55°56′46″N 3°13′47″W	Category B	29921	Upload Photo
1 West Harbour Road, Former Bonded Warehouse				55°58′52″N 3°13′31″W	Category B	29924	Upload Photo
22 West Harbour Road, Northern Lighthouse Board Engineering, Storage And Testing Facility, Including Outhouses				55°58′54″N 3°13′45″W	Category C(S)	29925	Upload Photo
126 Duddingston Road With Boundary Wall And Railings				55°56′45″N 3°08′07″W	Category B	29936	Upload another image
29 Woodhall Road, Capelaw With Retaining Boundary Wall, Steps, Gate, And Garage				55°54′22″N 3°15′31″W	Category C(S)	29949	Upload Photo
33 Woodhall Road, Torwood With Boundary Wall And Gate				55°54′20″N 3°15′33″W	Category C(S)	29950	Upload Photo
6 Woodhall Road With Boundary Wall				55°54′25″N 3°15′28″W	Category C(S)	29955	Upload Photo
7 York Place, Including Railings				55°57′21″N 3°11′31″W	Category A	29960	Upload Photo
110-112 (Consecutive Nos) Lower Granton Road, East Cottages				55°58′48″N 3°13′00″W	Category C(S)	29886	Upload Photo
89 West Bow				55°56′54″N 3°11′41″W	Category A	29903	Upload Photo
101 And 103 West Bow				55°56′53″N 3°11′41″W	Category A	29906	Upload Photo
Starbank Road, 1 And 2, And 6-8 Craighall Road, Newhaven				55°58′49″N 3°11′54″W	Category B	29832	Upload Photo
25 And 25A-C Thistle Street And 2 North West Thistle Street Lane				55°57′15″N 3°11′54″W	Category B	29837	Upload Photo
1 - 5 (Inclusive Nos) Trinity Crescent				55°58′48″N 3°12′21″W	Category C(S)	29851	Upload Photo
31 And 31A Trinity Crescent With Railings				55°58′47″N 3°12′13″W	Category C(S)	29856	Upload Photo
70, 72 And 74 Trinity Road, Including Boundary Walls And Gatepiers				55°58′33″N 3°12′27″W	Category C(S)	29857	Upload Photo
104 Viewforth, Kellyden, Including Boundary Walls				55°56′20″N 3°12′38″W	Category B	29875	Upload Photo
St Leonard's Bank 12 Gibraltar-House				55°56′34″N 3°10′36″W	Category B	29730	Upload Photo
St Patrick Square 24-25				55°56′34″N 3°11′00″W	Category B	29736	Upload Photo
6 St Patrick Street And 21 East Crosscauseway				55°56′37″N 3°11′00″W	Category C(S)	29741	Upload Photo
41-45 (Odd Nos) Salisbury Road, Salisbury Hotel, Including Boundary Walls				55°56′16″N 3°10′38″W	Category B	29757	Upload Photo
15-19A (Odd Nos) Scotland Street, Including Railings				55°57′36″N 3°11′41″W	Category B	29774	Upload Photo
25-27A (Odd Nos) Scotland Street, Including Railings				55°57′37″N 3°11′41″W	Category B	29776	Upload Photo
3 Rustic Cottages With Boundary Wall				55°54′29″N 3°15′11″W	Category B	29683	Upload Photo
1 Rutland Place, And 1 And 3 Rutland Street, Rutland Hotel And Bar, Including Railings And Lamp Standard				55°57′00″N 3°12′28″W	Category A	29685	Upload Photo
36 St Andrew Square, Dundas House, Royal Bank Of Scotland Head Office, With Associated Additions, Walls, Gatepiers, Gates, Railings And Lamp Standards				55°57′16″N 3°11′27″W	Category A	29705	Upload another image
4-16 (Even Nos) Roxburgh Street Including Wall And Railings				55°56′52″N 3°11′01″W	Category B	29676	Upload Photo
125, 127 And 127A Rose Street				55°57′07″N 3°12′08″W	Category B	29645	Upload Photo
35-37 (Inclusive Nos) Queen Street With Railings				55°57′16″N 3°12′02″W	Category A	29552	Upload Photo
78 And 78A Queen Street With Railings				55°57′12″N 3°12′24″W	Category A	29573	Upload Photo
35-41 (Odd Numbers) Raeburn Place				55°57′32″N 3°12′43″W	Category C(S)	29583	Upload Photo
Raeburn Street, 11 And 12				55°57′32″N 3°12′45″W	Category B	29592	Upload Photo
3 Ramsay Lane, Former Tolbooth Parish School				55°56′57″N 3°11′45″W	Category C(S)	29597	Upload another image
134 Princes Street, And 1 And 3 South Charlotte Street				55°57′03″N 3°12′20″W	Category B	29521	Upload Photo
135 And 136 Princes Street And 2-8 (Even Nos) South Charlotte Street, Charlotte House				55°57′03″N 3°12′23″W	Category B	29522	Upload Photo
142 And 143 Princes Street, Royal Bank Of Scotland				55°57′02″N 3°12′26″W	Category B	29523	Upload Photo
Quality Street 7, 9 Davidson's Mains, Bourtree Bank				55°57′48″N 3°16′24″W	Category B	29526	Upload Photo
15 Queen Street With Railings				55°57′18″N 3°11′51″W	Category B	29539	Upload Photo
Nicolson Street West 23-33				55°56′41″N 3°11′07″W	Category C(S)	29435	Upload Photo
Nicolson Street West, 55-57 And 14, 16 Chapel Street				55°56′40″N 3°11′09″W	Category B	29437	Upload Photo
Nicolson Street West, 24-30				55°56′41″N 3°11′06″W	Category B	29439	Upload Photo
70 Northumberland Street, Including Railings And Lamp				55°57′23″N 3°12′06″W	Category A	29459	Upload Photo
Old Church Lane, 14, Lochside House, Duddingston				55°56′30″N 3°08′51″W	Category B	29466	Upload Photo
24-28 (Even Nos) Nelson Street, Including Railings And Lamps				55°57′28″N 3°11′47″W	Category A	29392	Upload Photo
184 Newhaven Road, Ramsay House, Including Coach House, Gatepiers, Boundary Wall				55°58′37″N 3°11′32″W	Category B	29397	Upload Photo
232 Newhaven Road, Jessfield House				55°58′44″N 3°11′34″W	Category B	29402	Upload Photo
37-41 (Odd Nos) Nicolson Street				55°56′47″N 3°11′09″W	Category B	29416	Upload Photo
Nicolson Street, 124-132				55°56′39″N 3°11′00″W	Category B	29429	Upload Photo
Nicolson Street West, 11-15				55°56′42″N 3°11′06″W	Category B	29433	Upload Photo
5 And 7 Middleby Street, Including Boundary Walls And Pedestrian Gates				55°56′05″N 3°10′34″W	Category B	29332	Upload Photo
3 Minto Street, Including Boundary Walls And Pedestrian Gates				55°56′14″N 3°10′38″W	Category B	29338	Upload Photo
4 Minto Street, Including Boundary Walls				55°56′13″N 3°10′37″W	Category B	29339	Upload Photo
1, 2, 3 And 4 Peacock Court				55°58′50″N 3°11′36″W	Category C(S)	29286	Upload Photo
43-47 (Odd Nos) Newhaven Main Street				55°58′49″N 3°11′51″W	Category C(S)	29289	Upload Photo
2-4A (Inclusive Nos) West Mayfield And 31 And 31A Minto Street, Including Boundary Walls				55°56′02″N 3°10′29″W	Category B	29310	Upload Photo
22-26 (Even Nos) Keir Street, Including Boundary Wall And Railings				55°56′43″N 3°11′50″W	Category B	29201	Upload Photo
Lanark Road, 533 Juniper Cottage Juniper Green				55°54′12″N 3°17′06″W	Category C(S)	29204	Upload Photo
Lanark Road, 538 540 Juniper Green				55°54′13″N 3°17′05″W	Category C(S)	29210	Upload Photo
17-21A (Odd Nos) India Street, Including Railings And Lamps				55°57′21″N 3°12′19″W	Category A	29129	Upload Photo
12 India Street, Including Railings And Lamp				55°57′19″N 3°12′21″W	Category A	29132	Upload Photo
18 India Street, Including Railings And Lamp				55°57′20″N 3°12′22″W	Category A	29135	Upload Photo
32 India Street, Including Railings And Lamp				55°57′21″N 3°12′23″W	Category A	29138	Upload Photo
34 India Street, Including Railings And Lamp				55°57′22″N 3°12′23″W	Category A	29139	Upload Photo
Inverleith Place 37				55°58′03″N 3°12′33″W	Category B	29150	Upload Photo
Inverleith Row, 7				55°57′54″N 3°12′12″W	Category B	29156	Upload Photo
Inverleith Row, 42 And 43				55°58′09″N 3°12′27″W	Category B	29177	Upload Photo
25 Johnston Terrace				55°56′53″N 3°11′50″W	Category C(S)	29195	Upload Photo
12-16 (Even Nos) Hope Street				55°57′03″N 3°12′32″W	Category A	29094	Upload Photo
19 And 19B Howe Street, And 72-76, (Even Nos) Northumberland Street, Including Railings				55°57′22″N 3°12′07″W	Category A	29111	Upload Photo
1 And 2 Hunter Square And 124 High Street				55°57′00″N 3°11′18″W	Category B	29122	Upload Photo
3, 4 And 5 Hunter Square, Dolphin House				55°56′59″N 3°11′18″W	Category A	29123	Upload another image
51-55 (Odd Nos) High Street, Moubray House				55°57′02″N 3°11′07″W	Category A	29034	Upload another image See more images
123 High Street				55°57′02″N 3°11′12″W	Category B	29040	Upload Photo
High Street, 3 Advocate's Close ('Adam Bothwell's House')				55°57′00″N 3°11′30″W	Category A	29053	Upload Photo
2-8 (Even Nos) High Street				55°57′02″N 3°11′04″W	Category B	29055	Upload another image
142 And 144 High Street				55°56′59″N 3°11′19″W	Category B	29068	Upload Photo
High Street, New Assembly Close, Lord Reid Building				55°56′58″N 3°11′19″W	Category A	29069	Upload Photo
186 And 188 High Street				55°56′58″N 3°11′22″W	Category B	29074	Upload Photo
Hill Place 1, 2, 2A				55°56′46″N 3°11′04″W	Category C(S)	29075	Upload Photo
Hamilton Place 12-16				55°57′29″N 3°12′29″W	Category B	28994	Upload Photo
Henderson Row 62-70				55°57′36″N 3°12′21″W	Category B	29024	Upload Photo
7 South Gray Street, Including Gatepiers, Boundary Walls And Pedestrian Gate				55°56′03″N 3°10′37″W	Category B	28947	Upload Photo
23 And 25 Upper Gray Street, Including Boundary Walls				55°56′10″N 3°10′42″W	Category C(S)	28954	Upload Photo
48-52 (Even Nos) George Street				55°57′11″N 3°11′54″W	Category B	28869	Upload Photo
32 Gillespie Road, Huntly With Greenhouse, Gatepiers And Boundary Wall				55°54′28″N 3°16′14″W	Category B	28900	Upload Photo
48 Gilmore Place And 3 Lower Gilmore Place Including Boundary Wall				55°56′29″N 3°12′30″W	Category C(S)	28916	Upload Photo
89-95 (Odd Nos) Fountainbridge, 1 Thornybauk And 1 Ponton Street				55°56′39″N 3°12′22″W	Category B	28776	Upload another image
52-56 (Even Nos) Frederick Street With Railings				55°57′13″N 3°12′04″W	Category B	28795	Upload Photo
George Square 23				55°56′36″N 3°11′26″W	Category A	28816	Upload another image
George Square 27				55°56′35″N 3°11′25″W	Category A	28820	Upload another image
George Square 29				55°56′34″N 3°11′25″W	Category A	28822	Upload another image
George Square 56				55°56′39″N 3°11′14″W	Category A	28824	Upload Photo
George Square 57 And 58				55°56′39″N 3°11′14″W	Category A	28825	Upload Photo
12-22 (Even Nos) Dundonald Street(Includes 12,19A,19B, And 20B West Scotland Street Lane), Including Railings And Lamps				55°57′34″N 3°11′48″W	Category B	28726	Upload Photo
30-34 (Even Nos) Elder Street, Including Railings				55°57′21″N 3°11′27″W	Category A	28731	Upload Photo
142A And 144 Ferry Road And 27, 28 And 29 Summerside Place Including Boundary Wall And Railings				55°58′28″N 3°11′11″W	Category B	28745	Upload Photo
Ferry Road, Former Trinity Cottage, Boundary Walls, Gates And Lodge				55°58′17″N 3°12′33″W	Category C(S)	28749	Upload Photo

== Key ==
The scheme for classifying buildings in Scotland is:

- Category A: "buildings of national or international importance, either architectural or historic; or fine, little-altered examples of some particular period, style or building type."
- Category B: "buildings of regional or more than local importance; or major examples of some particular period, style or building type, which may have been altered."
- Category C: "buildings of local importance; lesser examples of any period, style, or building type, as originally constructed or moderately altered; and simple traditional buildings which group well with other listed buildings."

In March 2016 there were 47,288 listed buildings in Scotland. Of these, 8% were Category A, and 50% were Category B, with the remaining 42% being Category C.

== See also ==
- List of listed buildings in Edinburgh
