= Patrick Lindsay =

Patrick Lindsay may refer to:

- Patrick Lindsay, 4th Lord Lindsay (died 1526), counsellor of James IV of Scotland
- Patrick Lindsay, 6th Lord Lindsay (1521–1589), opponent of Mary, Queen of Scots
- Patrick Lindsay (bishop) (1566–1644), Archbishop of Glasgow
- Patrick Lindsay (Irish politician) (1914–1993), Irish Fine Gael politician
- Patrick Lindsay (Edinburgh MP) (1686–1753), British Army officer and Scottish politician

== See also ==
- Pat Lindsey (1936–2009), politician
- Pat Lindsey (golfer) (born 1952), American professional golfer
