= George Warrender =

George Warrender may refer to:

- Sir George Warrender, 1st Baronet (c. 1658–1721), Lord Provost, Member of Parliament for Edinburgh
- Sir George Warrender, 4th Baronet (1782–1849), Member of Parliament for Haddington Burghs, Truro, Sandwich, Westbury and Honiton
- Sir George Warrender, 7th Baronet (1860–1917), Vice-Admiral in the British Royal Navy
