= John Wightman of Mauldslie =

Scottish merchant

John Wightman of Mauldslie (c.1670–1740) was an 18th-century Scottish merchant who served as Lord Provost of Edinburgh from 1721 to 1723.

== Life ==
In 1702 he is noted as owner of Mary of Guise's former palace on the Castlehill, having purchased in from James Dalrymple, 1st Viscount of Stair. The building was demolished in 1845 to build New College.

He owned the estates of Huntlycoat and Mauldslie Castle on the River Clyde near Carluke.

In 1721 he succeeded John Campbell as Lord Provost of Edinburgh. Campbell resumed the role in 1723.

Mauldslie Castle was rebuilt by Robert Adam in 1792.

== Family ==
Christian Wightman, who died in 1805, widow of a John Wightman of Maudslie, is thought to be the wife of his grandson.
