= Gilbert Laurie =

Scottish merchant and senior excise officer

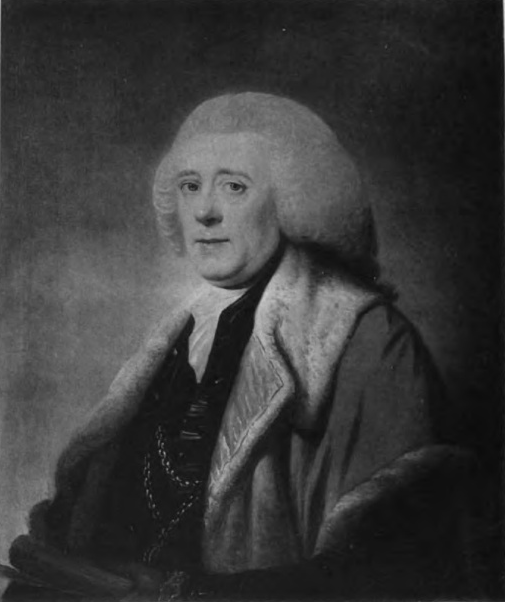
Gilbert Laurie, Lord Provost of Edinburgh, 1766-8, 1772-4

Gilbert Laurie of Polmont (1729–1809) was an 18th-century Scottish merchant and senior excise officer who twice served as Lord Provost of Edinburgh: from 1766 to 1768 and 1772 to 1774.

== Life ==
He was born in Polmont in 1729. He was Commissioner of Excise for edinburgh from around 1760. In 1766 he succeeded James Stuart of Binend as Lord Provost of Edinburgh. The construction of Edinburgh's New Town began during his term of office.

In 1774, he was living at Baxters Close off the Cowgate in Edinburgh. In 1784, he was still Commissioner of Excise but lived at Cowgatehead at the east end of the Grassmarket. In 1784/5, he built or remodelled Polmont House near Falkirk, as his main home.

He died at Polmont, on 10 September 1787, and is thought to be buried in Polmont Parish Churchyard.

== Artistic recognition ==
He was portrayed in office around 1768 by David Martin.

== Family ==
He married Katherine Erskine, daughter of the Hon Thomas Erskine, son of Henry Erskine, 3rd Lord Cardross.

His daughter, Katherine Laurie married Alexander Marjoribanks of Marjoribanks (1750-1830) in 1790.
