= William Neilson (Lord Provost) =

Scottish merchant and mason

William Neilson was a 17th/18th century Scottish merchant and mason who served as Lord Provost of Edinburgh 1717 to 1719.

His term of office was sandwiched between the two terms of John Campbell. He was paid a salary of £300 per year from the City Treasurer Robert Wightman but was also the first Provost who had to swear an oath that he would receive no other monies (i.e. an anti-bribery oath).

He was father to the architect/builder Samuel Neilson who designed the Royal Bank of Scotland in 1750.
