= Norman Irons =

Scottish politician (1941–2023)

Norman Macfarlane Irons CBE (4 January 1941 – 26 November 2023) was a Scottish politician who was lord provost of Edinburgh between 1992 and 1996.

Irons was born on 4 January 1941. He was the first lord provost of the city from the Scottish National Party (SNP). Although Irons was one of only two SNP representatives on the city council at the time, these votes were crucial in maintaining the minority administration of the ruling Labour Party. As such, Labour councillors were his majority backers for the post of lord provost.

In 2005 he asserted that the Edinburgh Royal Infirmary killed his 89-year-old mother through "basic neglect" and improper care.

Irons served as the honorary consul for Hungary in Edinburgh.

Irons was appointed Commander of the Order of the British Empire (CBE) in the 1995 New Year Honours for services to local government.

Irons died on 26 November 2023, at the age of 82.

== See also ==
- List of Lord Provosts of Edinburgh

Preceded by Eleanor McLaughlin	Lord Provost of Edinburgh; 1992–1996	Succeeded by Eric Milligan
