= Eleanor McLaughlin =

Scottish politician (born 1938)

Eleanor Thomson McLaughlin (born 3 March 1938) is a Scottish politician, and a former member of the Labour party.

== Community charge ==
McLaughlin refused to pay her Community Charge and was threatened with a warrant sale on her home.

== Lord Provost ==
Lord Provost of Edinburgh, Scotland, between 1988 and 1992. She was only the third member of the Labour Party ever to hold the office. She was also the first female Lord Provost and the first Roman Catholic to hold the post since the Reformation.

== Devolution and independence ==
McLaughlin was against devolution, feeling that without "proper tax raising powers" government could not work. She changed her mind, and said in 2014 that devolution had worked, and that the next step was independence.

== See also ==
- List of Lord Provosts of Edinburgh

Preceded by Dr John McCay	Lord Provost of Edinburgh; 1988–1992	Succeeded by Dr Norman Irons
