= Luffness Castle =

Castle in East Lothian, Scotland

Coordinates: 56.0141°N 2.8440°W

Designations

Inventory of Gardens and Designed Landscapes in Scotland
- Official name: Luffness
- Designated: 30 June 1987
- Reference no.: GDL00270

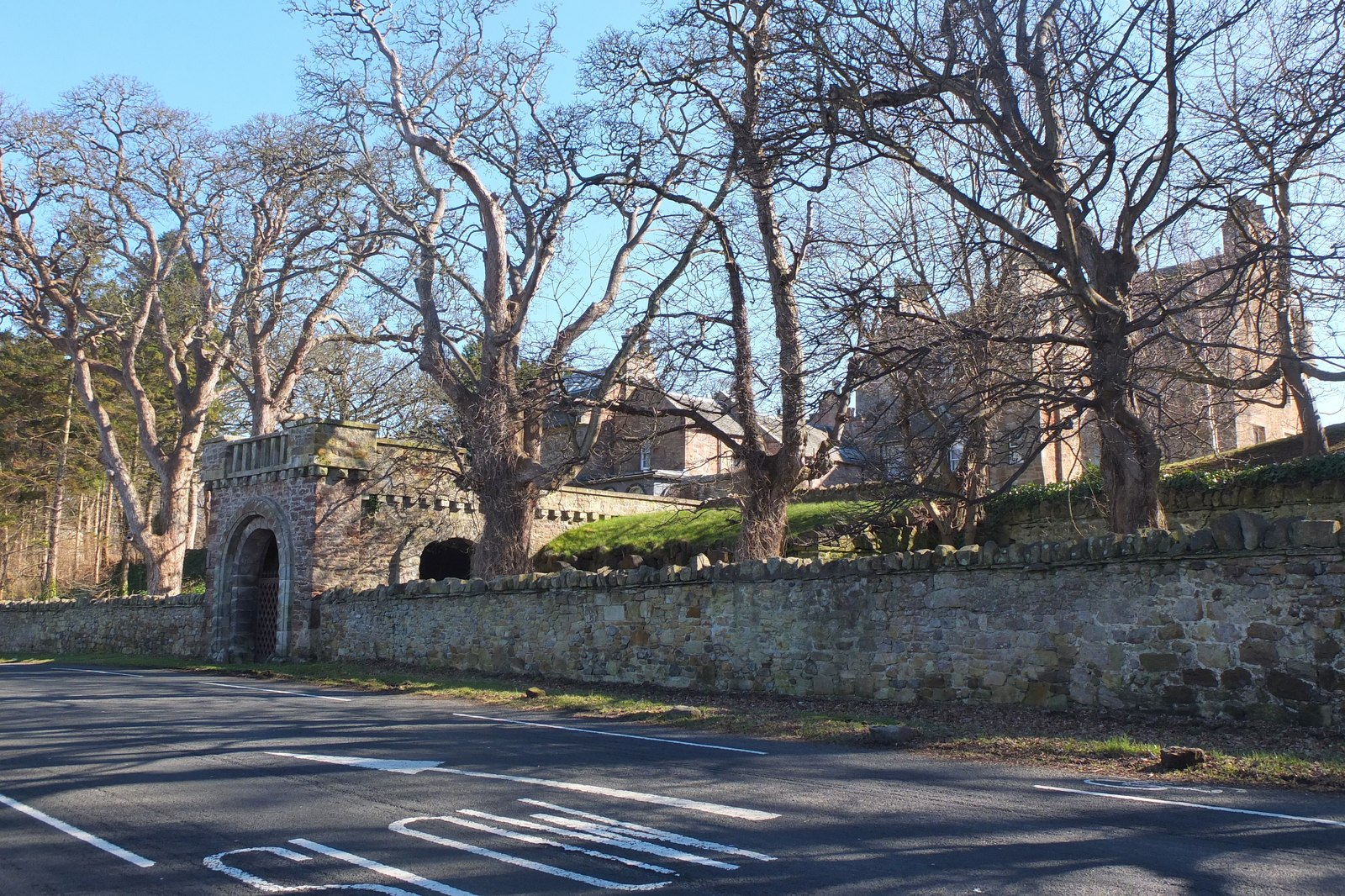
Luffness House in 2019.

Luffness Castle, also known as Luffness House, is a house built in a former fortification near the village of Aberlady, East Lothian, Scotland.

== History ==
The lands around the current house were a part of the estates of the Gospatrick Earls of Lothian, but in the 12th Century they were given to the Lindsay family in marriage and this family constructed a castle on the site in the 13th century, this was described as a large and strong fortress. Some of the property was donated to the Church as a memorial to Sir David Lindsay, High Chamberlain of Scotland in 1256 and a Regent for Alexander III, who died on crusade which was under the leadership of Louis of France. On his deathbed Sir David promised to donate land for a religious house so long as his remains were returned to Scotland. A Carmelite friary was then built nearby in 1293 and remnants of the priory still exist overgrown within the woods. Edward II and an English army occupied the castle in 1311. It was sacked in 1547 by an English force under the command of Edward Clinton, Lord Clinton.

The English army treasurer and diplomat Ralph Sadler advised the Earl of Shrewsbury that a new fort at Aberlady would support an English garrison to be installed nearby inland at Haddington. There were also suggestions that an English fort should be built for this purpose at "White-castell" at Nunraw or on the "Pethes", a narrow route between hills in Scotland.

French and Scots soldiers, directed by Paul de Thermes, built a fort here in 1549 to interrupt the English supply to their garrison at Haddington. On 23 June 1549 Regent Arran summoned neighbouring villagers to fight off English soldiers trying to prevent the buildings work. On 25 June Arran requested the lairds of East and West Lothian to provide labourers. The royal treasurer's accounts refer to the "fort of Aberlady". Oxen dragged guns from the fort to the nearest harbour in January 1550 for shipping to Monifieth, to be used against Broughty Castle.

The fort was demolished by Patrick Hepburn of Waughton on the orders of Mary of Guise in 1552. He was instructed to leave an existing house and mansion, and deliver the artillery to Dunbar Castle.

In the second half of the 16th Century the ownership of Luffness was transferred to the Hepburn Earls of Bothwell who rebuilt the castle and in the 17th century the estate change ownership again to the Durham family while an Adam Duff of Luffness is recorded in 1704. In 1739 the Hope Earl of Hopetoun bought Luffness and in 1822 the castle and was altered and extended by William Burn with the further works carried out under the direction of David Bryce in 1846 and 1874. Today the house is well maintained, and is still occupied by the Hope family.

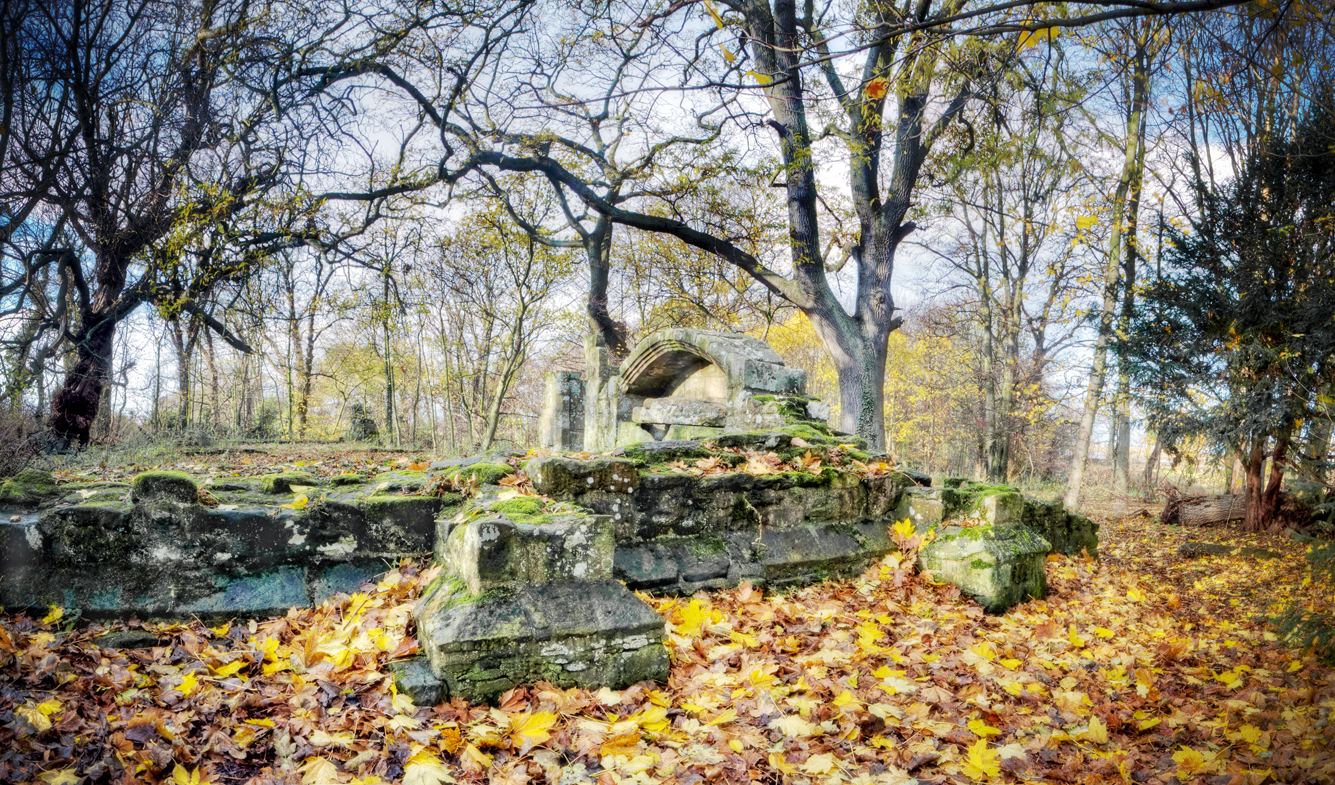
Friary remains, Luffness (geograph 2218928)

== Description ==
Luffness House is presently a tower house of three storeys with an attic and it forms a T shape with the square turret forming its stem. There is a turnpike stair which occupies the first two floors. Nigel Tranter thought that this stair incorporated what was left of the castle, and is likely from the 13th century. The house is situated at the northwestern angle of a square fortification which is delineated by a partially infilled ditch which may be a remnant of the French built fortifications from 1549, or it may be the remains of the earlier castle.

== See also ==
List of places in East Lothian

== Bibliography ==
- Lindsay, Maurice The Castles of Scotland, Constable & Co. 1986
- Coventry, Martin The Castles of Scotland, Goblinshead 1995
