= Richard Lawson of High Riggs =

Scottish landlord, diplomat and lawyer

Richard Lawson of High Riggs or Hieriggis (died 1507) was a Scottish landlord, diplomat and lawyer. He was elected the Lord Provost of Edinburgh for the years 1492, 1493 and 1504. He was a creditor for James III of Scotland, and he was the Lord Justice Clerk from 1504, and he was an ambassador for Scotland. He was the father of James Lawson, who was a Member of Parliament for Edinburgh for the years 1526, 1531 and 1532, and he was the grandfather of James Lawson, Lord Lawson, who became the Lord Provost of Edinburgh in 1532.

== Career ==
Lawson was trained as a lawyer and largely served the country in the role of ambassador in treaties with England and as King's Council. He served as Town Clerk in Edinburgh in 1482. He was Justice-Clerk from 1489 and was still in post described as Justice-Clerk-General to the King in January 1504/5.

Lawson joined with Edinburgh merchants in lending money to James III of Scotland in 1482 and 1488, two crisis years of his reign.

He was one of the counsellors appointed for managing the affairs of James IV. Along with Alexander Home, Chamberlain of Scotland, and others, he was one of the Commissioners appointed to ratify the treaty concluded at Coldstream on 5 October 1488 for a three years' truce with England. On 30 May 1490 he was one of the Commissioners of the King who, with 300 horsemen, had a safe conduct for two months to enter England, remain and return. On the 25th June 1492 he was one of the King's Commissioners who concluded a new 7 year treaty with England, and on 28 July the next year was again a Commissioner in a party of ambassadors to England for 6 months; and yet again on 22 May 1495 he was one of the Ambassadors, with 100 horsemen, who had a safe conduct to England for 6 months.

He was one of the ambassadors of Scotland, who concluded a new 7 year treaty with England, at Ayton, Berwickshire, on 30 September 1497, ratified by King James on 10 February 1498 in the presence of Pedro de Ayala, Prothonotary of the King & Queen of Spain and their ambassador to Scotland.

In May 1505, Lawson was acting as Provost of Edinburgh and with the burgh council accepted a receipt from Julian Laci, the factor of the Italian merchant Jerome Frescobaldi, which declared that the former Provost, Alexander Lauder of Blyth had returned all the goods belonging to Frescobaldi which had been in his custody.

== Family ==
Richard Lawson married Jonet Elphinstone. Lawson's children included three sons and a daughter:

- Richard Lawson II, who married Jonet Liddale. His father gave him an estate known as Cairnmuir in the Pentland Hills in October 1504.
- Robert Lawson, who was killed at the Battle of Flodden in 1513.
- James Lawson, who attended the Scottish Parliament in 1528 and again in 1532.
- Marion or Marjorie Lawson (died 1553), who married John Haldane of Gleneagles in 1508. John Haldane was killed at Flodden. Marjorie Lawson was described in David Lyndsay's Squyer Meldrum.

His grandson James Lawson, Lord Lawson, became both a Senator of the College of Justice and Provost of Edinburgh in 1532.
