= Thomas Tod =

Scottish leather merchant

Sir Thomas Tod was a 15th-century Scottish leather merchant who served four times as Provost of Edinburgh.

Very little is known of his life but he was probably born around 1450 in Edinburgh. He was a merchant on the upper section of the Royal Mile.

He served as Provost firstly from 1488 to 1490, succeeding Patrick Hepburn, 1st Lord Hailes. He was knighted at the end of this service and reappears three times on the list of Provosts as "Sir Thomas Tod": 1491 to 1492; 1496 to 1498; and 1499 and 1500. In 1497 his duties included overseeing an epidemic of the "grandgore" (syphilis) during which victims were confined on the isle of Inchcolm in the Firth of Forth.

His large house gave name to Tod's Close on Castlehill. Following his death, and reflecting its size and grandeur, the buildings were acquired by Mary of Guise as her main Edinburgh quarters, conveniently close to Edinburgh Castle. It extended down the Mound where he had tanneries linked to his leatherworks.

He is presumed to have died in Edinburgh around 1510. Persons dying at that time would be buried in the graveyard of St Giles Cathedral on the High Street. The graveyard was obliterated to create the High Courts. His neighbour, the lawyer James Jollie, gives his name to Jollie's Close, adjacent to Tod's Close.

The final remnants of his house were lost on the construction of New College for the Free Church of Scotland.

His descendants included the future Provost of Edinburgh Archibald Tod.
