= James Lawson, Lord Lawson =

Scottish lawyer and politician

James Lawson, Lord Lawson was the Lord Provost of Edinburgh for the year 1532. He was also one of the first nine Senators of the College of Justice, whose offices were inaugurated in the Scottish legal system at their accession.

He was the son of James Lawson, who was the Member of Parliament for Edinburgh in the Scottish Parliament for the years 1526, 1531 and 1532. and he was the grandson of Richard Lawson of High Riggs, who was the Lord Provost of Edinburgh for the years 1492, 1493 and 1504.

== Family ==
He was married to Janet Elphinstone, Lady Lawson. Lady Lawson Street in Edinburgh, which adjoins High Riggs, is named after her.

His children included John, Patrick and George Lawson.
