= Robert Cairncross =

Robert Cairncross O.S.A
- Bishop of Ross
- Church: Roman Catholic Church
- Diocese: Ross
- Appointed: 14 April 1539
- Term ended: 1544
- Predecessor: James Hay
- Successor: David Panter
- Previous post(s): Abbot of Holyrood Provost of Corstorphine

Personal details
- Died: 1544

Robert Cairncross (died 1544) was a Scottish bishop.

At various times he was provost of Corstorphine, abbot of Holyrood. He was appointed bishop of Ross in 1539, holding in commendam the abbacy of Fern. He also held office as Lord High Treasurer of Scotland from 1528 to 1529 and from 1537 to 1539.

== Life ==
Robert was a descendant of the ancient family of Balmashannar, Forfarshire, which had been seated there as early as the time of Robert II. He was provost of the collegiate church of Corstorphine, and one of the chaplains to James V of Scotland. On 5 September 1528 he was nominated Lord High Treasurer on the downfall of the Earl of Angus, replacing Archibald Douglas of Kilspindie. James V also gave Robert a tenement in Edinburgh close to a house of Andrew Moubray that had been given to Kilspindie.

Knowing that the Abbot of Holyrood was on the point of death, Robert, according to George Buchanan, wagered a large sum with James V that he would not present him to the first vacant benefice, while the King, quite well aware of what he referred to, accepted and won the wager. Suspected of favouring the cause of the Douglases, he lost the treasurership almost as soon as he obtained it, although he again held it from 1537 to 1539. On 23 June 1539 he was admitted to the see of Ross, and shortly afterwards received in commendam the abbacy of Fern, the dilapidated state of which his wealth was expected to repair. On the death of James V he was appointed one of the lords of the council to the governor, the Earl of Arran, when he joined in opposing the treaty of peace with England. He died in April 1544. He is the subject of two Latin epigrams by George Buchanan.
