= Archibald Stewart (Lord Provost) =

Scottish merchant and politician

Archibald Stewart of Mitcham MP (1697–1780) was an 18th-century Scottish merchant and politician who served as Lord Provost of Edinburgh during the Jacobite Rising of 1745. He was imprisoned in the Tower of London for over a year for alleged negligence.

== Life ==
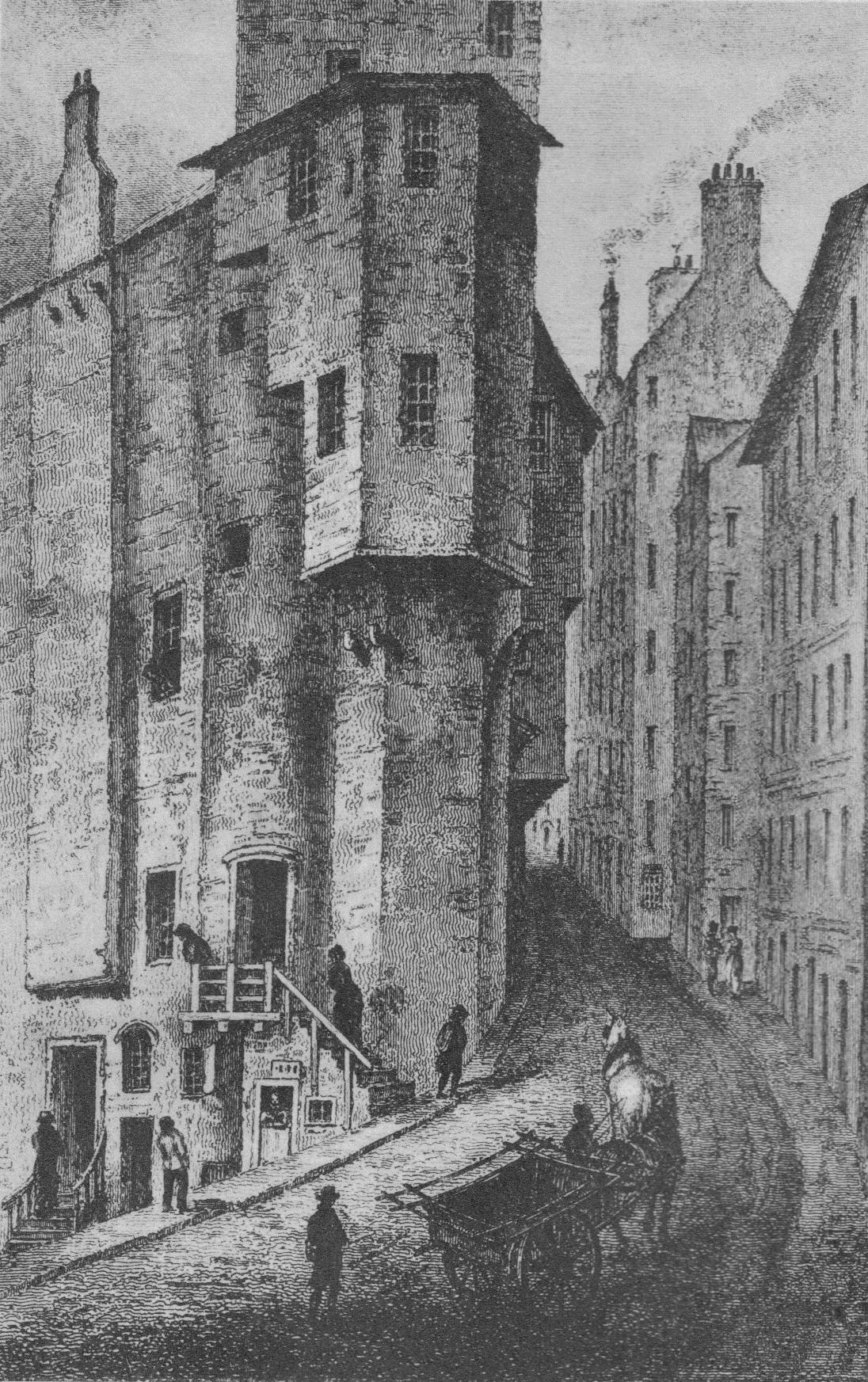
Archibald Stewart's House at the junction of Grassmarket and the West Bow, in Edinburgh

He was born in 1697 the son of Sir Robert Steuart, 1st Baronet of Allanbank near North Berwick (at that time simply called Berwick). His mother was Steuart's second wife, Jean Cockburn, daughter of Sir Archibald Cockburn baronet of Langton.

Around 1715 he began trading as a wine merchant on the Royal Mile in Edinburgh.

In 1718 he was admitted as a burgess on the Edinburgh town council.

In 1741 he was elected (as an opposition Whig) as MP for Edinburgh. He was one of the "Duke of Argyll's gang" voting against the Hanoverians in 1744.

Spending more time in London due to his parliamentary duties, in 1743 he opened a wine shop at 11 Buckingham Street on The Strand.

In 1744 he succeeded John Coutts as Lord Provost of Edinburgh. His most infamous reputation during his period as Lord Provost was the "surrender" (or welcoming depending on one's politics) of the city of Edinburgh to the Jacobite Army of Bonnie Prince Charlie on 17 September 1745. Stewart had received a royal warrant requiring him to raise a resistance force on 26 June and had raised a militia of around 300 men. However, this force was not put into operation, and the Jacobite force received little resistance. Supplementing the volunteers two brigades of Dragoons were dispatched to Coltbridge on the west of the city (known as the Coltbridge Canter, and often erroneously connected to the later Battle of Prestonpans). This force did not fight with the rebels, but were instead ordered to retreat, first to Leith, then right out of the city to Prestonpans (which is where the confusion of events arises). Despite Edinburgh's "official allegiance" to England at the time, it may be safely assumed that the majority of the politicians (and perhaps the general population) sympathised with the Jacobite cause. The Jacobite army were safely accommodated within Edinburgh. For this treasonous act Stewart was arrested and had to appear before the Privy Council in London on 7 December 1745 charged with "neglect of duty". Ironically the larger blame (if any were due) lay on the shoulders of the elderly General Joshua Guest, who had control of Edinburgh Castle and direct command of the dragoons.

On 10 December he was ordered to be detained by the House of Commons and was accordingly detained in the Tower of London from 13 December. He was released from the Tower on 23 January 1747 following payment of £15,000 bail (a truly huge sum in the 18th century).

Returning to Edinburgh he was re-trialed under Andrew Fletcher, Lord Milton and found not guilty on 2 November 1747. This seemed to centre on the warrant requiring him to raise a militia but did not require him to use it in any stipulated manner. He afterwards returned to London to continue business on the Strand, living in the Mitcham district.

Grant states that Stewart lived in the house at the foot of the West Bow, facing onto the Grassmarket during his period as Lord Provost and describes it as full of "secret stairs and trapdoors".

He was succeeded as Lord Provost by George Drummond in 1746. It was Stewart not Drummond who remained Provost at the time of the Battle of Prestonpans, but (as stated above) the "capture" of Edinburgh is often muddled around the date of that battle.

In 1773 he (or possibly his son) is listed as a merchant living and working at Parliament Close on the Royal Mile.

He died in Bath on 24 January 1780 aged 82.

== Family ==
In or before 1728 he married Grizel Gordon, daughter of John Gordon an Edinburgh wine merchant. They had four sons and five daughters. One of their sons was John Stewart (Arundel MP).

His daughter Grizel Stewart married Edward Marjoribanks of Hallyards and Lees, parents of Sir John Marjoribanks, 1st Baronet of Lees, Lord Provost of Edinburgh 1814/1815.

Parliament of Great Britain
Preceded by Patrick Lindsay	Member of Parliament for Edinburgh; 1741–1747	Succeeded by James Ker
