= Archibald Tod =

Scottish landowner and merchant

Sir Archibald Tod (1584–1656) was a 17th-century Scottish landowner and merchant who twice served as Provost of Edinburgh, from 1646 to 1648 and 1651 to 1654. Tod represented a moderate force during a period of political extremes.

== Life ==
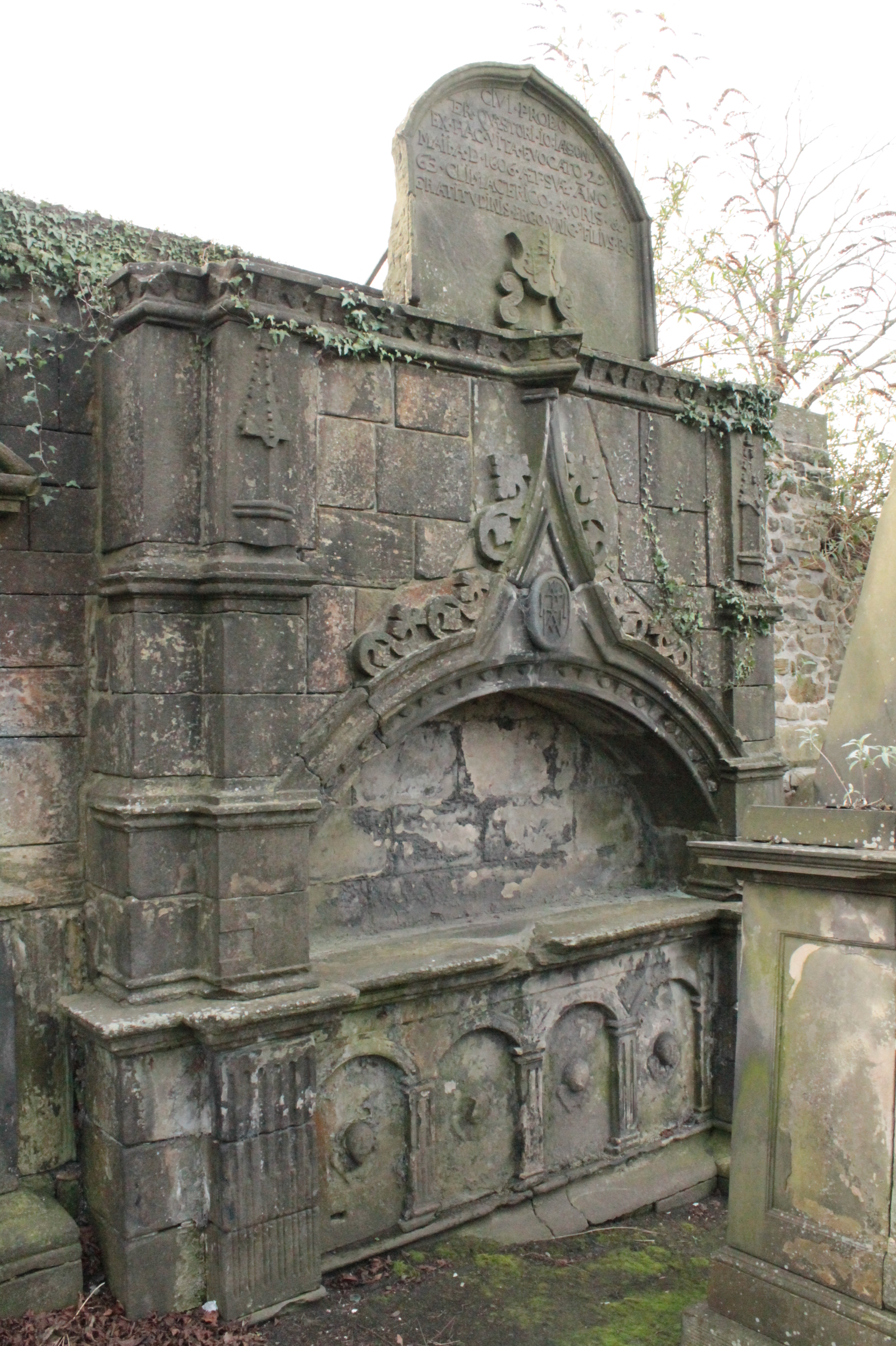
The grave of Archibald Tod, Greyfriars Kirkyard

He was born in Edinburgh in 1584. His Edinburgh address is unknown but was somewhere on the upper section of the Royal Mile. Given the small population of Edinburgh, rarity of the name, and political connection, it is highly likely that he was the great-grandson of Sir Thomas Tod, four times Provost of Edinburgh in the 15th century.

He joined Edinburgh's town council in 1622. He was three times Baillie and twice Dean of Guild.

In 1646 he succeeded Sir John Smith of Grothill as Provost. He was elected in preference to the more active figure, the Covenanter, Edward Edgar. On 29 May 1648 he was attacked by a mob on the Royal Mile due to his involvement in a levy on the population towards the war.

His term of office was interrupted by James Steuart, of Coltness from 1648 to 1652. Tod did not stand in the controversial 1648 election, which took an unprecedented twelve days to resolve. Steuart held the role when the Covenanters took control of the city in September 1648. Tod was elected for a second term in 1651 (aged 67), representing a safe moderate line within continuing troubled times. After his second term of office he was succeeded by Sir Andrew Ramsay, Lord Abbotshall in 1654.

He died on 9 February 1656 aged 71 and is buried in Greyfriars Kirkyard. The grave is largely illegible but lies between the tomb of William Chalmers and the tomb of John Byres of Coites (Coates), behind the sunken vault of John Baptist Medina.

== Family ==
He married Helene Jacksone and they had 4 children. Robert 1618, Katherine 1620, Jonet 1621 and Archebald 1623. Katherine married David Wilkie, a burgess in the city during Tod's term of office... Katherine and David had 12 children. On a lot of records and certificates Katherine was also spelt Catharine...

One of his son Archebald's wives was Margaret Jowsie (d.1655). John Jossie (brother to Margaret) was a fellow burgess on Edinburgh council.

== Trivia ==
Tod's grave has lost its original top and inscription (evidenced by the truncated pilasters to the sides). The current top (although bearing a date 1606) was added around 1930 by the city architect E J Macrae as part of a wider restoration of the older tombs in the churchyard. The new top has reinterpreted the presumably worn Tod coat of arms at the head of the tomb (presumably without research), and instead of three foxes shows three holly leaves.
