= Sir George Warrender, 1st Baronet =

Scottish merchant and politician (c. 1658–1721)

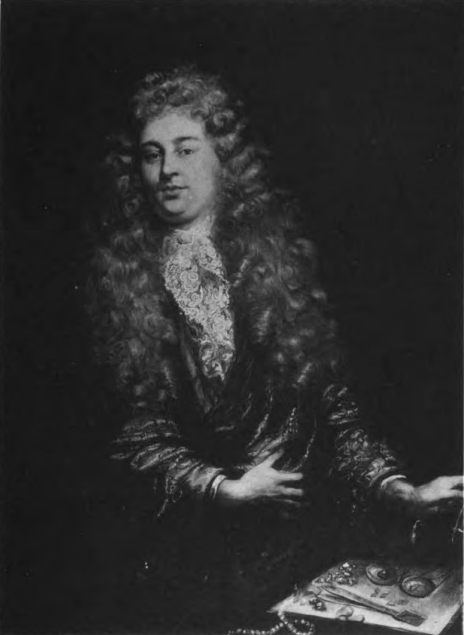
Sir George Warrender, Lord Provost of Edinburgh

Sir George Warrender, 1st Baronet (c. 1658 – 4 March 1721) of Bruntsfield and Lochend, Edinburgh was a Scottish merchant and politician who sat in the House of Commons from 1715 to 1722.

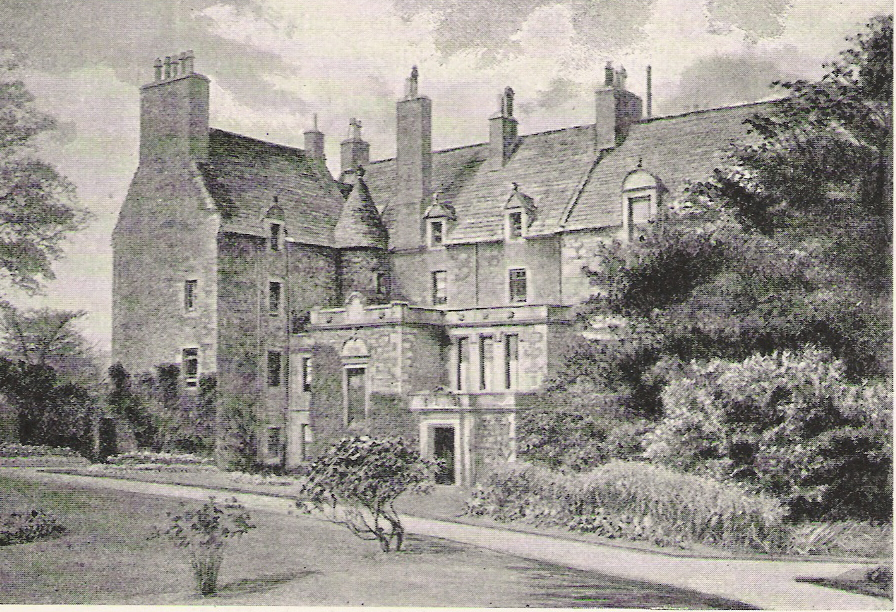
Bruntsfield House in 1897

Warrender was the only son of George Warrender and his wife Margaret Cunninghame. His father died when he was an infant. He became a dealer of foreign trade at Edinburgh. He prospered and in 1675 purchased Bruntsfields, and then adjacent properties, and eventually acquired Lochend. He married Margaret Lawrie daughter of Thomas Lawrie, a merchant of Edinburgh, on 13 April 1680. She died in 1699 and was buried on 2 June 1699. Six months later he married by proclamation dated 10 December 1699, Grissel Blair, daughter of Hugh Blair, merchant of Edinburgh. In 1705 he was member of a syndicate that was assigned farm of the customs and foreign excise of Scotland for three years. He was Lord Provost of Edinburgh for the year 1713 to 1714.

Warrender was a Whig, having been fined as a dissenter under James II, and supported the Hanoverian succession. As Lord Provost, he had proclaimed George I's accession at Edinburgh. He was elected as Whig member of parliament (MP) for Edinburgh at the 1715 general election and was created a Baronet, of Lochend, in the County of Haddington on 2 June 1715. In Parliament he voted with the Government in every recorded division. At the start of the 1715 Jacobite rebellion, he was in London but went to Scotland in August, judging it was more important for him to be at Edinburgh at the time than in Westminster. In 1716 he applied for compensation for his expenses and loss of trade during the rebellion. He supported the Government with regard an opposition motion of 4 June 1717, censuring Argyll's rival, Lord Cadogan but subsequently was fearful or the temper of the city as a result of his behavior in the House of Commons.

Warrender died at London on 4 March 1721, a year before the next general election, and was buried at Bunhill Fields. He had a son and daughter by his first wife, and three sons and five daughters by his second wife. He was succeeded in the baronetcy by his eldest son John.

Parliament of Great Britain
Preceded by Sir James Stewart	Member of Parliament for Edinburgh; 1715 – 1721	Succeeded by John Campbell
Baronetage of Great Britain
New creation	Baronet (of Lochend); 1715 – 1721	Succeeded by John Warrender
