= Greysteil =

Medieval epic poem

Greysteil ("Graysteel") is a medieval poem popular in 16th century Scotland. Set to music, it was performed for James IV of Scotland and James V of Scotland. The poem was also called Syr Egeir and Syr Gryme, Eger and Grime being the names of the two knights who fight Greysteil and whose contrasted virtues are the poem's real subject.

== Text ==
Though the poem was popular in 16th century Scotland, the original Eger and Grime is thought to have been written in the North of England in the mid-15th century, although a Scottish origin is argued for one of its two versions.

The text survives only in these three late versions:

- P - Text in Bishop Percy's Percy Folio manuscript (ca. 1650) runs 1474 lines.
- L - David Laing's reprint in 1826 of an earlier chapbook (James Nicol, printer, issued in Aberdeen in 1711) runs 2860 lines (thus "longer by about 1,400 lines")
- H - Unique copy owned by the Huntington Library of a 1687 blackletter Eger, similar to L.

The Percy copy P is considered the more faithful to the original work, the Laing-Huntington version being "a corrupt and expanded version".

The oldest published version now existing was printed in Glasgow in 1669. but this, the 1687 Huntington-owned copy, and a 1711 edition are nearly identical prints.

== Plot ==
Sir Greysteil is a knight thought invincible who lives in the Land of Doubt or the Forbidden Country. He is challenged by Sir Eger or Eager who seeks to impress a high born lady, Winglaine. Eger is defeated, and Greysteil cuts off the little finger of his right hand.

Eger is nursed by Lillias or Loosepain, who tells him his efforts are worthless if they are not reciprocated by his lady. Eger ignores this advice and decides to try again. As he is still weak from his wounds, his friend Sir Grime or Graham takes his armour and sets out, bidding farewell to Winglaine. Following the advice of a third brother knight, Pallyas, Sir Graham obtains a sword of supernatural character called 'Egeking' from Eger's aunt, Sir Egram's Lady. Egeking was wrought far beyond the Mediterranean Sea for the price of a jewel of highest quality. She took the title deeds of both knights' lands as a pledge for the sword, with a warning that it should never come into a coward's hands, saying:

"There was no fault with Egeking,
but for want of grace and governinge,
may loose a kingdom and a king.

Armed with virtue and now the love of Lillias, Graham rides to the land of Doubt and overcomes Greysteil. When Greysteil is close to defeat, Graham asks him to yield;

Grime sayd, "yeeld thee, Sir Gray-Steele,
for thou can never doe soe weele.
the other said, thou mayest lightlye lye;
that man I shall never see;
that man was never of woman borne,
shall make me yeelde, one man to one.

However, no man of woman born could abide the drawing of the sword Egeking.

Graham continues the charade, and Eger marries Winglaine. After Graham's death, when Eger tells her the truth she leaves him. In a final episode sometimes suggested to be a late addition, Eger joins the crusades, and on his return marries Lillias.

== Analysis ==
=== Celtic or Teutonic origins ===
One looming and divisive issue has been whether this tale is one of essentially Teutonic or of Celtic origins. The editors John W. Hales and Frederick J. Furnivall dismissed a Celtic origin, saying "We see no reason for referring it to Celtic traditions". Edith Rickert who published a popular translation of the tale has also stated that "The Story of Gray-Steel, fundamentally Teutonic, but with perhaps some Celtic admixture".

Mabel van Duzee's 1963 study, however, offers a more modern survey on this issue. She credits Sir Walter Scott as an early observer that this tale might be of Celtic tradition. Van Duzee (who draws parallels from romances of the Arthurian cycle, the Old French lais, etc.) further suggests that the characters of Eger and Grime are derived from Yder and Gawaine, two well known figures in medieval Arthurian romance (and the latter of which is one of the titular heroes of the 14th century Middle English romance Ywain and Gawain, while Winglaine is likely derived from Guenloie, the name of Yder's lover in the medieval French Romance of Yder.

James R. Caldwell (the editor of the parallel text edition) said the plot was taken from a Celtic variant of the widespread Die Zwei Brüder type story, that is, it was a cognate of "The Two Brothers" from the Grimms' Fairy Tales). Though this may lead one to believe Caldwell subscribed somewhat to the Germanic/Teutonic origins view, Van Duzee assures us that his thesis was that Eger and Grime's plot "derived from purely Celtic sources (not Celtic and Teutonic)".

Editors Walter Hoyt French and Charles Brockway Hale (1930) noted that the Teutonic element is slight, but speculate that the name Grime may derive from a giant-god in Teutonic mythology, and Eger to come from the Germanic sea god Ægir.

Deanna Delmar Evans has more recently looked at the question of English or Scottish origin, noting the lack of intrinsic linguistic evidence in the surviving texts and concluding a root in cross-border ballad tradition, and the 'Huntingdon-Laing' version its Scottish branch. She also highlights possible similarities to Cumberland place-names suggesting an association at some date with the western border. In the poem itself, the action is located in 'Beame', meaning Bohemia.

=== Lady of the thorn and combat at the ford ===
Van Duzee observed that the name of the fay-like lady Loospine had a name which was a corruption of the French la dame de l'Espine, or "the Lady of the Thorn" (the hawthorn, or white thorn tree).

Van Duzee makes a point there was a medieval association of the thorn tree "with magic, with wells, streams, or fords, and even with the traditional ford combat". In the present tale, Loosepine (the lady of the thorn) figures as the provider magical healing to the combatants, and the place where two fords was the place where Eger combated Sir Greysteil. Other tales with this association are Le lai de l'espine ("Lay of the Thorn"), where a thorn tree grows at the ford where the hero combats, the Arthurian tale Diu Crône where Gasozein guards the ford of the Blackthorn, and Van Duzee has many more Celtic and Arthurian examples to offer.

=== Otherworldly adversary ===
The ford represents a sort of boundary with the otherworld, and hence the opponent represents a magical Otherworldly figure. So another Celtic tale that Van Duzee uses as a parallel is the combat at the ford that the human Pwyll, prince of Dyfed takes up with his Otherworldly adversary Hafgan in the Mabinogi.

In the present work, Greysteil too has the marks of being an Otherworldly being, in that he is a "red man", with red hands, carrying a red shield and riding a huge red steed. Graysteil also has the oddity of having extra fingers on his hands. Otherworldly hounds often have eerie red ears, and Pwyll encounters them in the opening of his tale. Compare the horse with two red ears, ridden by the knight of the Ford of the Thorn in the aforementioned lai de l'Espine.

=== Loosepaine and Morgan le Fay ===
Van Duzee also seeks to establish a relationship between Loosepaine and Morgan le Fay. They are certainly both healers; the poem itself notes Loosepaine's skills in leechcraft (healing), "Why was she called Loosepaine?/A better Leeche was none certaine" (P, vv.1407-08), while Morgan is known for healing Arthur in Avalon according to the Vita Merlini.

Van Duzee builds her case, not so much by comparing the two figures directly, but rather via other fays as intermediarie. One of the fays is the mistress of Urbain, the son of the Queen of Blackthorn, whom Perceval defeats at the Ford Perilous in the Didot-Perceval. Another is the fay Oriande, who discovers the infant Maugis d'Aigremont by the thorn tree and rears him into a great mage. Though Oriande is a figure from the Charlemagne cycle, Van Duzee argues she is a transformation of the Morgan character.

== Performance, reception, and tune ==
Although the poem may have originally been an English composition, the oldest records of its performance and reception are Scottish. "Gray Steil" was sung by "twa fithelaris [two fiddlers]" to James IV at Lecropt on 17 April 1498 who were paid 9 shillings for their performance. A lutenist called 'Gray Steil' was given 5 shillings on 22 January 1508. The poem was mentioned by David Lindsay of the Mount and listed in the 1549 Complaynt of Scotland. When Lindsay mentions the poem in his 1552 prologue, the Auld Man and Wife in the Cupar Banns, he has the boasting soldier Fynlaw place the Forbidden Country, which was bounded by sea and river, near Bo'ness;

This is the sword that slew Greysteill
Nocht half a myle beyond Kinneil. (Note: Evans (2001), p. 280: The 16th century legal writer Habakkuk Bisset calls the nearby Antonine Wall 'Graham's Dyke' and says it was destroyed by the Auld Grahams, following Hector Boece, Historia, Book 7 Chap. 16., where Graham destroys the "wall of Abercorn", (Other ancient boundaries in Britain are called Grim's Ditch), Rolment of Courtis, vol. 2 (Edinburgh: STS, 1922), 131: JHS, 'The Traditions of the Grahams (continued),' in The Scottish Antiquary, or, Northern Notes and Queries, vol. 17 no. 65 (July 1902), pp. 9-11: Lindsay perhaps refers to the lion in midst of Greysteil's heraldry and Craig Lyon Castle, near Kinneil.)

Lindsay also compares the valour of Sir Grim to William Meldrum of Cleische and the House of the Binns in Squyer Meldrum.

A published edition was noted in the stock of an Edinburgh printer, Thomas Bassendyne, in 1577. An English writer, John Taylor the Water Poet, who came to Scotland in 1617, recorded the popularity of tales of Sir 'Degre', Sir Grime and Sir Gray Steele in Scotland as comparable with those of Bevis, Gogmagog, Chinon, Palmerine, Lancelot and Tristram "amongst us here in England; with similar stories "filling whole volumes with the ayrie imaginations of their unknown and unmatchable worth."

The musicologist John Purser reconstructed a tune from manuscript notes and a transcription published in Robert Chamber's Book of Days, from the lost lute book of Robert Gordon of Straloch, c.1627-29, and it was performed for BBC Radio Scotland's Scotland's music, broadcast in 1991.

== Eponynms ==
The name of the protagonist, a strong and agile knight, opulent, tainted with the black-arts, and vanquished by a magic sword provided by a powerful woman, was adopted as a nickname for two 16th-century courtiers, Archibald Douglas of Kilspindie who was said to have been dominated by his wife Isobel Hoppar, and William Ruthven, 1st Earl of Gowrie, and Alexander Montgomery, 6th Earl of Eglinton in the 17th-century, and was a given name of the 20th-century 2nd Earl of Gowrie.
