= James Stuart of Binend =

Lord Provost of Edinburgh

Sir James Stuart of Binend (1716–1777) was an 18th-century Scottish merchant who was twice Lord Provost of Edinburgh 1764 to 1766 and 1768 to 1770.

== Life ==
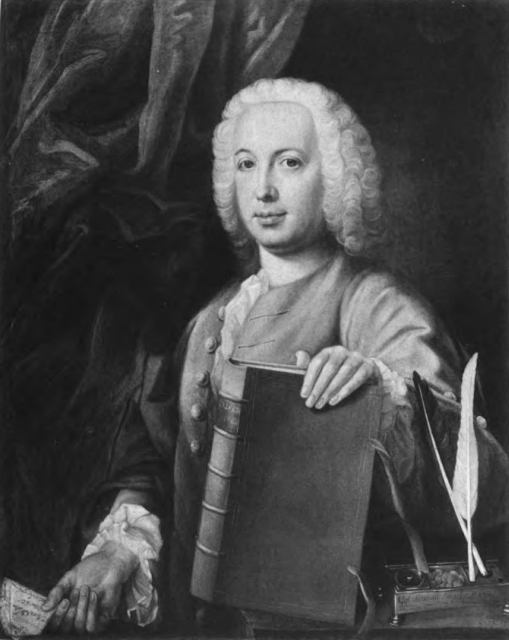
James Stuart, Lord Provost of Edinburgh, 1764 to 1766 and 1768 to 1770

He was born on 13 April 1716 the son of Charles Stuart of Dunearn in Fife (1672-1732) and his wife, Jean Hamilton.

He died in Edinburgh on 10 June 1777. He is buried in Greyfriars Kirkyard. His large tomb lies midway along the eastern wall amongst other large monuments.

== Family ==
He firstly married Elizabeth Drummond, daughter of Prof Adam Drummond. Following her death in 1752 he married Alison Spittal. daughter of James Spittal of Leuchat and cousin of his first wife. Alison died at Kirkbraehead in Edinburgh aged 93.

He was father to Rev Dr Charles Stuart of Dunearn FRSE (1748-1806), later minister of Cramond, who married Mary Erskine, daughter of John Erskine of Carnock. With dual training as a physician, Charles was President of the Royal College of Physicians of Edinburgh from 1806 to 1809.

Charles' son was James Stuart (1775-1849).
