= Patrick Lindsay (Edinburgh MP) =

British Army officer and Scottish politician

Patrick Lindsay (1686–1753) was a British Army officer and Scottish politician who sat in the House of Commons from 1734 to 1741. In 1736, the Porteous Riots broke out in Edinburgh, and Lindsay was sent to seek help from the Army which turned out badly.

== Early life ==
Lindsay was baptized on 10 March 1686, the only surviving son of Patrick Lindsay, rector of St Andrews Grammar School, and his wife Janet Lindsay, daughter of John Lindsay of Newton. He joined the army and was ensign Sir Robert Rich’s Foot in 1711, serving in Spain during the war of the Spanish succession. He was put on half pay in 1713 and pursued his occupation as an upholsterer at Edinburgh. Lindsay married under a contract dated 22 June 1715, Margaret Monteir, daughter of David Monteir merchant of Edinburgh. He married as his second wife, Janet Murray, daughter of James Murray of Polton, Midlothian.

== Career ==
Lindsay was Lord Provost of Edinburgh from 1729 to 1731 and again from 1733 to 1735. He was returned as Member of Parliament for Edinburgh by Lord Ilay at the 1734 British general election. He made his first reported speech in support of the army estimates on 14 February 1735.

During the Porteous Riots in September 1736, the rioters took over the town of Edinburgh. The magistrates sent Lindsay to seek assistance from General Moyle the commander of the troops stationed nearby. For several real and alleged reasons there was a lack of co-operation between Moyle and Lindsay and their response was inadequate, so that Porteous was lynched by the mob. Lindsay was subsequently examined by both Houses on the matter.

On 16 May 1737 Lindsay spoke against the bill inflicting penalties on the provost and city of Edinburgh. He condemned the local clergy, who openly condoned the lynching, and was thereby charged of doing more damage to Edinburgh than all the evidence for the bill. He spoke and voted with the Government on the Spanish convention in 1739, also voting with them against the place bill in 1740. He was not put up at the 1741 British general election.

== Later life and legacy ==
Following the death of his second wife in November 1739, Lindsay married as his third wife Lady Catherine Lindsay, daughter of William Lindsay, 18th Earl of Crawford, on 7 May 1741. He was appointed Governor of the Isle of Man by the Duke of Atholl in 1744. He died on 20 February 1753 leaving three sons and two daughters.

Parliament of Great Britain
Preceded by John Campbell	Member of Parliament for Edinburgh; 1734–1741	Succeeded by Archibald Stewart
