= Thomas Magnus =

English priest and diplomat

Thomas Magnus (1463/4–1550) was an English churchman, administrator and diplomat.

== Life ==
Archdeacon of the East Riding of Yorkshire 1504, Magnus was employed on diplomatic missions 1509–19 and 1524–7. He was present at the Field of the Cloth of Gold 1520, and was made Privy councillor about 1520. Awarded a doctorate by the University of Oxford 1520, he became canon of Windsor 1520–49, Prebendary of Lincoln Cathedral 1522–48, paymaster of the forces and treasurer of the wars in the north 1523, and custodian of St Leonard's Hospital, York 1529. He was also the founder of the Thomas Magnus Grammar School, Newark c. 1530.

When the "Valor Ecclesiasticus" was drawn up in 1534, Thomas Magnus was warden of Sibthorpe. Regarding Sibthorpe College, "we have some evidence of the dimensions of the building in a letter written by Thomas Magnus, who was warden of the college in the reign of Henry VIII, to Cardinal Wolsey."

Magnus died on 18 August 1550, and is buried in Sessay in the North Riding of Yorkshire, his epitaph reads "Here lyeth Mr Thomas Magnus, arch-deacon of the East Riding in the metropolitan church of York, and parson of this church, which died the 18th day of August, anno domino 1550, whose soul God pardon."

== Mission to Scotland ==
After waiting at Newcastle for instructions from Henry VIII and Wolsey, and a Scottish safe-conduct, Magnus and Roger Radclyff arrived in Edinburgh on 29 October 1524. They delivered letters to James V and Margaret Tudor at Holyroodhouse on All Saint's day. Then trumpets and shawms blew, and the court went into the Abbey for mass, during which James V read the letters with Gavin Dunbar. After mass, Magnus and Radclyff gave James a sword and a coat of cloth-of-gold, gifts from Henry VIII. James put on the coat straight away. Magnus visited Margaret Tudor at Perth in March 1525, bringing certain news of the defeat of Francis I of France at Pavia and a letter from Henry VIII that made her weep uncontrollably for an hour. In April Magnus claimed that James V had told him he would rather be in England with his uncle than in Scotland, and Margaret agreed.

Magnus was in Scotland in August and September 1525. He wrote that when James V received a gift of a silver dagger from the Duke of Albany he immediately gave it away to a person standing nearby, an apparent insult to the Duke. French ambassadors were kept waiting at Leith for three or four days rather than having a solemn reception. Magnus claimed that James moved to Dalkeith Palace to avoid the French ambassador, Pierre François de Lagarde, sieur de Saignes, President of Toulouse. The news was supposed to indicate that Scotland was moving away from French influences and the 1517 Treaty of Rouen for the king's marriage to a French princess. He wrote to Margaret Tudor who was staying north of Edinburgh that he had spoken with James' former governess or 'mistress' about her political interests. In 1528 he opened the topic of James V marrying Princess Mary with the diplomat Adam Otterburn.
