= John Campbell (Edinburgh MP) =

Scottish politician

John Campbell (1664–1739) was a Scottish politician who sat in the House of Commons from 1721 to 1734.

Campbell was the second son of Walter Campbell, of Skipness, Argyll and his first wife Jean Campbell. He was probably educated at Glasgow in 1681. He was an Edinburgh business man and was active in the city council.

Campbell was bailie of Edinburgh in about1714 and stood for Edinburgh at the 1715 general election, pledging to attend Parliament free of charge, and to pay £500 to the poor if he did not attend. However he was defeated on this occasion. In October 1715 he was elected Lord Provost of the city of Edinburgh for the year. This was in the middle of the Jacobite Rebellion, and ten days after taking up post, his prompt action in summoning the John Campbell, 2nd Duke of Argyll from Stirling saved the city from rebel occupation. He served as Lord Provost again in the year 1719 to 1720.

At a by election on 18 March 1721, Campbell was returned unopposed as Member of Parliament for Edinburgh and was returned again at the 1722 general election. He was Lord Provost again for the year 1723 to 1724 when there was disturbance in protest against the malt tax. He attributed the comparative quiet at Edinburgh in comparison with Glasgow to the prudence and firmness of the magistrates and council. At the 1727 general election, he was re-elected MP for Edinburgh and generally voted with the Government. In 1729, he became Treasurer at Edinburgh. He retired at the 1734 general election.

Campbell died unmarried in about May 1739.

Parliament of Great Britain
Preceded by Sir George Warrender	Member of Parliament for Edinburgh; 1721–1734	Succeeded by Patrick Lindsay
