= Adam Otterburn =

Scottish lawyer

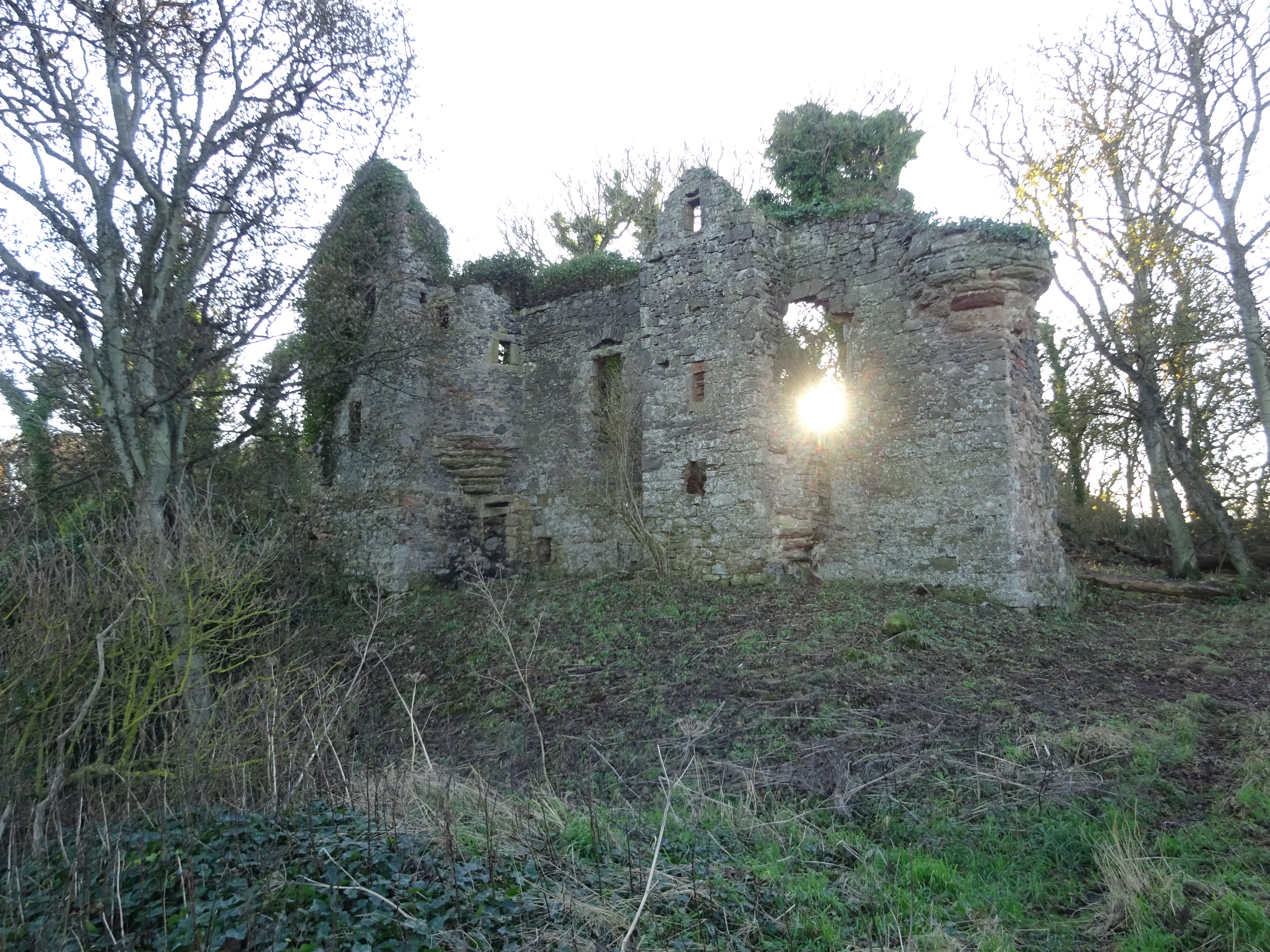
Auldhame Castle, close neighbour to the Douglas family's Tantallon Castle

Sir Adam Otterburn of Auldhame and Redhall (died 6 July 1548) was a Scottish lawyer and diplomat. He was king's advocate to King James V and secretary to Mary of Guise and Regent Arran.

In 1527 Otterburn was one of 30 councillors appointed to sit on the Session.

== The King's lawyer ==
=== The law brought against the Douglas family ===
Adam Otterburn was an important servant of the Scottish monarchy as a lawyer and a diplomat. In August 1524, Margaret Tudor sent him to England with the Earl of Cassilis and Scot of Balwearie to negotiate peace, and a possible marriage for James V with Princess Mary. In May 1525, the English ambassador Dr Thomas Magnus recommended him to Cardinal Thomas Wolsey for an annual pension of £20. In 1528, Magnus and Otterburn again discussed the possibilities of a marriage between James V and Princess Mary.

When James V assumed the throne as an adult ruler and rejected the Douglases and their associates, Otterburn drew up charges of treason against them on 13 July 1529. On 8 November 1529, he was one of the Scottish commissioners who met English diplomats at Berwick-upon-Tweed. This meeting discussed the possible restoration of the Earl of Angus, an issue which Henry VIII could use as leverage to decide James's choice of future bride. A five-year truce was concluded and the Douglases were to go into English exile.

In May 1532, he was of the first 15 lawyers appointed as Senators of Justice. While in England he was knighted by James V (in his absence) as Sir Adam Otterburn of Redhall on 16 February 1534. Redhall, his other estate, is within Edinburgh near Longstone. Otterburn brought letters from Henry VIII and Thomas Cromwell to Margaret Tudor in July 1536. In July 1538, Otterburn was consulted about the text of a speech in French which Henry Lauder was to give to welcome Mary of Guise to Edinburgh.

Around this time, Otterburn had a conversation with Thomas Wharton about gold mining in Scotland at Crawford Moor. Otterburn said that James IV had mines but only found loose pieces of gold or gold ore rather than a vein, and spent more on the work than he recovered. The Duke of Albany also opened mines. In 1546, Wharton had a gold medallion coined by Albany, said to be minted from Scottish gold.

=== Anglo-Scottish politics and the Protestant Reformation ===
Adam Otterburn signed a border peace treaty in London on 11 May 1534. After the English Reformation, in 1536, Henry VIII requested a meeting with James V, and Otterburn was sent to London again to discuss Henry's motives and the possible agenda. He was in London during the arrest and conviction of Anne Boleyn. In April 1537 Otterburn and other courtiers joked with the English messenger Henry Ray about English Friars who were now refugees in Scotland.

In June 1538 he wrote a speech with David Lyndsay in French to welcome Mary of Guise to Edinburgh, to be given by Master Henry Lauder. In August 1538 he was imprisoned in Dumbarton Castle and in November deprived of office and fined £1000 for communicating with the forfeited Earl of Angus. The English border official Thomas Wharton heard that the former comptroller James Colville was also imprisoned for "his accomptes".

Following the death of James V, Otterburn received from the king's wardrobe a gift of armour on 22 December by the order of Cardinal Beaton, including a "secret courage", a helmet covered with corduroy, a "jack of plate", two rapiers and other items.

== If your lad was a lass: The War of the Rough Wooing ==
=== A sympathy for England strained ===
The English diplomat Ralph Sadler reported that Otterburn was a member of Cardinal David Beaton's pro-French faction, but Adam insisted the contrary, attributing his troubles and difficulties during the adult rule of James V to his pro-English position. The Governor of Scotland, Regent Arran, ordered Otterburn's arrest on 28 April 1544 but Robert Reid the Bishop of Orkney interceded for him.

Years later in 1561, Ralph Sadler reminded the English Privy Council of Adam's words to him on the marriage proposed between Mary and Edward;

"Our people do not like of it. And though the governor and some of the nobility have consented to it, yet I know that few or none of them do like of it; and our common people do utterly mislike of it. I pray you give me leave to ask you a question: if your lad was a lass, and our lass were a lad, would you then be so earnest in this matter? ... And lykewise I assure you that our nation will never agree to have an Englishman king of Scotland. And though the whole nobility of the realm would consent, yet our common people, and the stones in the street would rise and rebel against it"

=== Chivalry at the gates of Edinburgh ===
When the English army intent on the destruction of Edinburgh landed at Granton and took Leith, as Provost of Edinburgh, Adam Otterburn was sent out with two heralds to parley with the Earl of Hertford on the morning of 5 May 1544. Hertford had been instructed not to negotiate, so Adam replied in defiance and refused to yield up the town. Hertford had not yet landed his guns so offered to wait till 7:00 pm.

During an interlude in the war with England, Otterburn was concerned to recover money owing to him. His holding of lands at Auldhame, like those of his neighbours Oliver Sinclair, the favourite of James V, and John, 5th Lord Borthwick, required duties to be paid to Cardinal David Beaton. Adam wrote to the Cardinal hoping for money owed to him by Sinclair, and he noted that Borthwick and other landowners south of the River Forth sold their wool in England. Adam was now distrusted by Regent Arran and briefly imprisoned with a threat of further lawsuits. Friends like Elizabeth Gordon, wife of John Stewart, 4th Earl of Atholl wrote to Mary of Guise on his behalf. They were closely allied; Adam's son John had married the Countess' sister in law, Janet Stewart.

In October 1546, Adam set out with David Panter and a servant of d'Oysel, the French ambassador in Scotland to meet with Henry VIII at Oatlands. They brought the Scottish ratification of the Treaty of Ardres or Camp. Before they left Adam complained he had not enough money and horses to get to Musselburgh (a town close to Edinburgh). While they were waiting to see Henry the other diplomats were delighted to see them arguing. In March 1547, three of his servants were allowed to return to Scotland.

=== Last minute negotiations in London before the Battle of Pinkie ===
Otterburn was still negotiating for peace in London before the Battle of Pinkie. On Sunday 7 August 1547 he went to Hampton Court and met Edward VI. There he was dismissed as a diplomat by the council as it was now a time of hostility. He was given £75 as a gift for his departure. Otterburn saw,

"afoir my eis verray gret preparatioun of weir, and actualie the gret hors, the harnes, the hagbutaris, and all gorgious reparrale set forwart towart our realme."

Before my eyes very great preparation of war, and actually the great horse, the armour, the firearms, and all the gorgeous equipment set forward towards our realm. David Caldwell, Vicky Oleksy, Bess Rhodes, The Battle of Pinkie, 1547: The Last Battle Between the Independent Kingdoms of Scotland and England (Oxbow, 2023), p. 30:

The "gorgeous" equipment included leather horse armour designed and made by the workshop of the Italian artist Nicholas Bellin of Modena.

On Monday, he returned to Hampton Court and had further discussions with the Protector Somerset. He wrote to Regent Arran urging him take his warnings of the English invasion seriously, and begged him to allow George Douglas of Pittendreich to negotiate with Somerset, writing; "I dreid ye will nocht gif credence quhill ye se thame cum in at the dur," (I dread you will not believe till you see them come in the door). Arran had already set up a system of coastal watchers and warning beacons. However, his army was defeated by the English at the Battle of Pinkie on 10 September 1547.

== Sore hurt on the head ==
In his letters in 1546 and 1547 Otterburn mentions that he was "aged and sickly", but Otterburn died after an assault in Edinburgh by a servant of Regent Arran on 3 July 1548, "sore hurt on the head and his servant slain at his heels." Patrick Mure, laird of Annestoun near Lanark, and his son were charged with treason for his murder, their last recorded summons for the crime was at the instance of Mary of Guise.

== Family ==
Adam married firstly, Janet Rhynd, and secondly, Euphame Mowbray, with whom he had three sons, John, Robert and Thomas. He had three daughters, Margaret, Janet, and another whose name is unknown. His eldest daughter, Margaret, married Sir John Wemyss of Wemyss. In February 1544, another daughter was married and Adam asked Mary of Guise for financial support as "sik materis requiris coist and expensis", and again in 1546 he mentioned to David Beaton his difficulty in paying "my dochteris tocher". His son, John, married Janet Stewart, sister of the Earl of Atholl.
