= Alice De Lancey Izard =

American socialite (1745–1832)

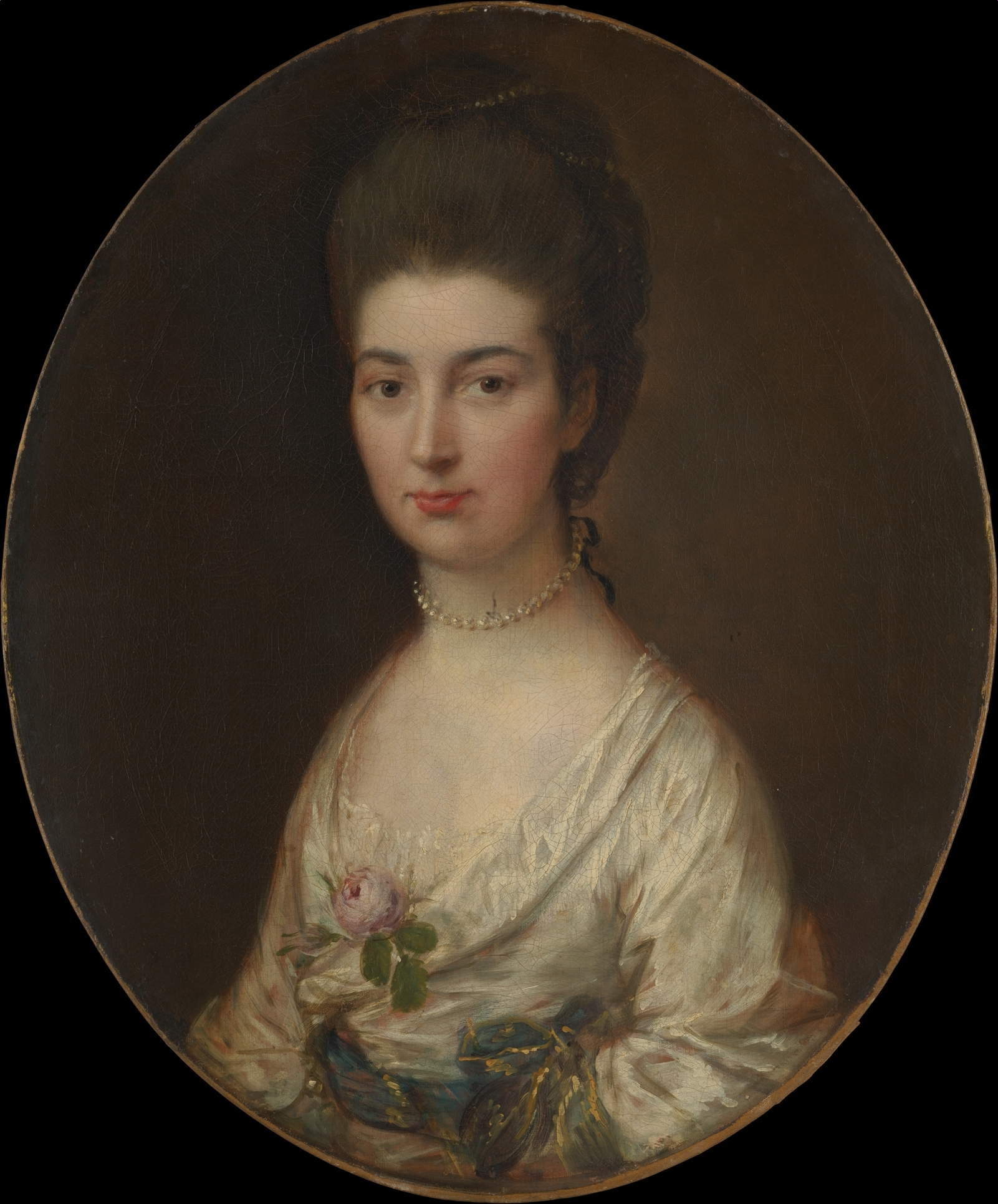
- Portrait by Thomas Gainsborough
- Born: Alice De Lancey; 1745; New York City, U.S.
- Died: April 1, 1832 (aged 86–87)
- Occupation: socialite
- Spouse: Ralph Izard (m. 1767; died 1804)
- Children: 14, including Ralph and George
- Relatives: Stephen De Lancey (brother); James De Lancey (brother); James De Lancey (uncle); Oliver De Lancey (uncle); Étienne de Lancy (grandfather); Cadwallader Colden (grandfather)

Alice De Lancey Izard (née, De Lancey; (Note: Her maiden name and the surname of family members also appears as Delancey, de Lancey, de Lancy, or DeLancey.) 1745 – April 1, 1832) was an American socialite. Her life was one of varied experiences, reaching from the seclusion of a South Carolina plantation where she introduced the culture of silkworms, hoping it to be a benefit to the state, to the social life in European cities. She spent several winters prior to the American Revolution in London society, after which she resided in Paris, where she was said to be admired at exclusive French salons. She accompanied her husband, Ralph Izard, to the Court of the Grand Duke of Tuscany. Mrs. Izard took on the role of a politician's wife while her husband served as a U.S. Senator. In her later years, widowed, she conducted dinner parties in Philadelphia, Pennsylvania.

Born in New York City into a well-connected family, her grandfathers were Étienne de Lancy and Cadwallader Colden. She had several siblings, including brothers Stephen De Lancey and James De Lancey. Mr. and Mrs. Izard had fourteen children including, Ralph DeLancey Izard and George Izard.

== Early life ==
Alice De Lancey was born in New York City, 1745. (Note: The Metropolitan Museum of Art records Alice's year of birth as 1746/47.) She was the second daughter of Peter DeLancey (1705–1770), of Westchester County, New York, and Elizabeth (née Colden) DeLancey.

Among her siblings were brothers, James De Lancey, a Loyalist, and Stephen DeLancey, both later serving as members of the General Assembly of Nova Scotia. In 1775, her sister Jane Delancey (1750–1809) married John Watts in a double wedding, along with her other sister, Susannah Delancey (1754–1837), who married Thomas Henry Barclay. Jane and her husband resided in Broadway; during the first session of the first Congress, the Watts entertained Senator Izard and family in the Watts mansion.

Alice's paternal grandparents were French immigrants Étienne de Lancy and Anne (née Van Cortlandt) DeLancey, herself the third child of Gertrude (née Schuyler) Van Cortlandt and Stephanus Van Cortlandt, the Chief Justice of the Province of New York. Her maternal grandfather, Cadwallader Colden, and her uncle, James De Lancey served as Colonial Governors of New York.

Her girlhood was spent in New York's social circles.

== Career ==
=== South Carolina ===
In 1767, Alice married Ralph Izard, of South Carolina, whom she had met while he was a student at Harvard University. He had been educated at the University of Cambridge, and after returning to America, had passed his winters in South Carolina and his summers in New York City. He was financially well-off and of a high social standing.

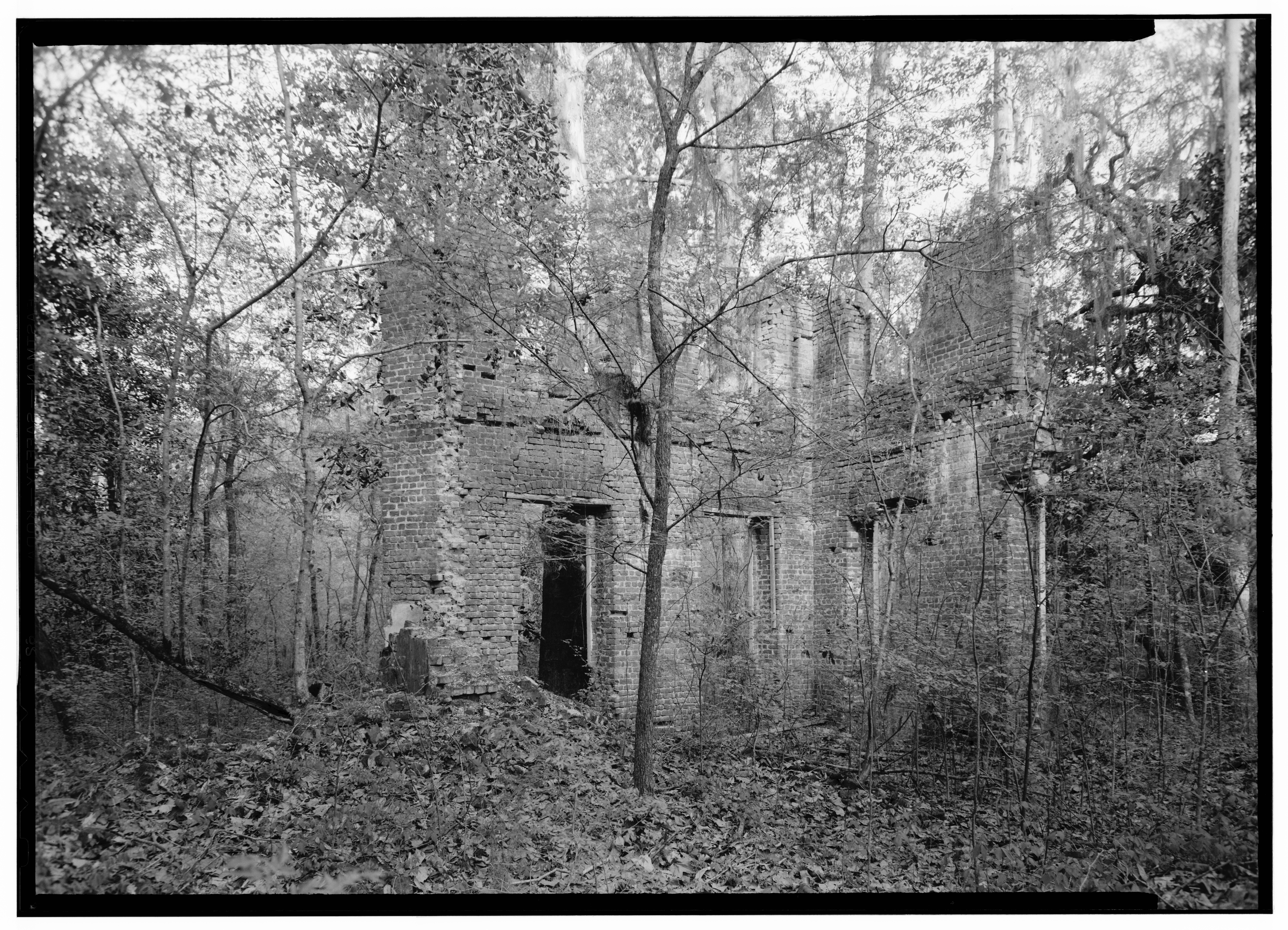
"The Elms" (ruins)

The first few years of their married life were spent upon "The Elms," the old Izard estate in South Carolina. "The Elms" was located on Goose Creek, a tributary of the Cooper River. In this house, the Izards entertained Lafayette when he made his tour of the country, one of the octagonal shaped wings of the house being fitted up for his entertainment. Here, Lafayette spent a night, and ever afterwards this wing was known as Lafayette's Lodge. Here, also, Mrs. Izard adapted herself to different life from which she had been accustomed. Her husband was a man of wealth, and the Izards one of the most distinguished families of the South, having emigrated to South Carolina in 1694. It was Mrs. Izard who introduced into South Carolina the culture of silk worms, hoping it to be a benefit to the state. The garden at The Elms was her especial care and pride, with its rose trees, cape jessamine hedges, and the flowers that blossomed each year.

=== Europe ===
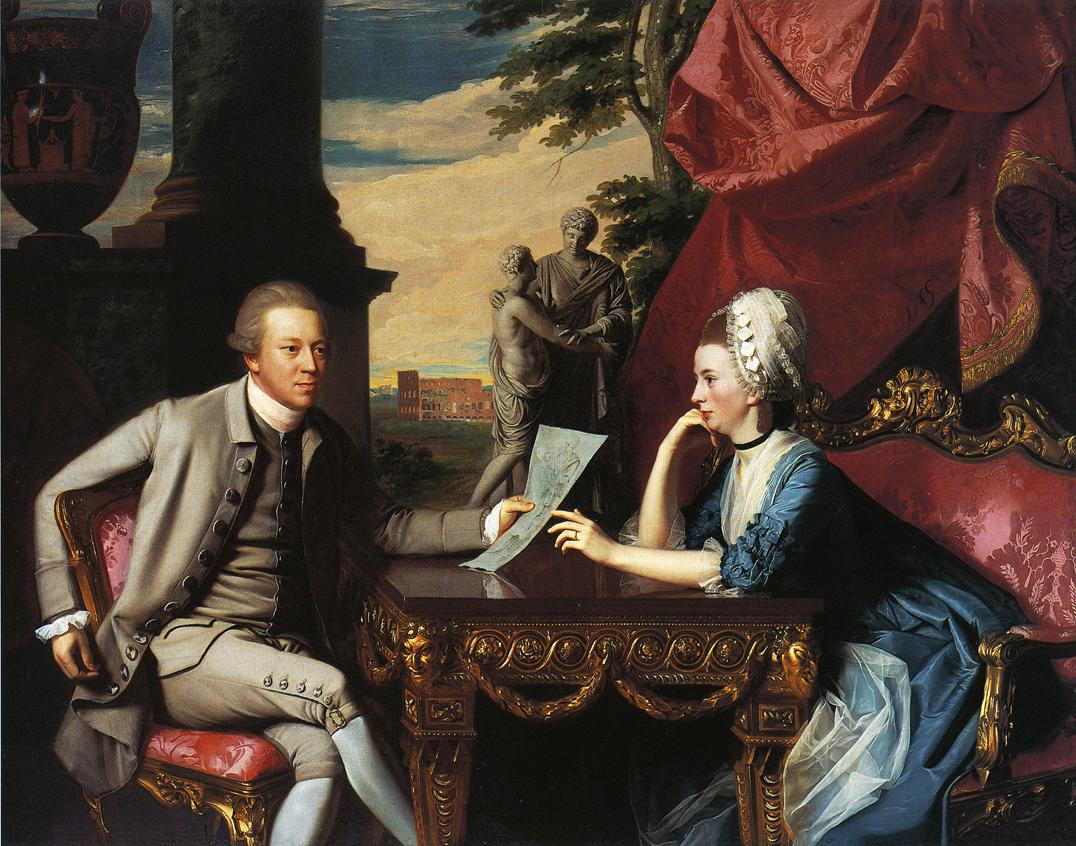
Ralph and Alice Izard by John Singleton Copley

About 1771, the Izards went to Europe and took up residence in London, the primary reason being the education of their children, though it was also the case that Mr. Izard wanted to spend a few years of life with his English friends who had high positions at the English Court. While in Europe, Mrs. Izard became quite fashionable. Artists begged her to sit for them, men sought introduction to her. Women copied her gowns and bonnets and tried to imitate the Southern drawl that Mrs. Izard had adopted. In 1774, Mr. and Mrs. Izard travelled in France, Switzerland, and Italy, leaving their children in England.

In 1777, Mr. Izard moved his family to Paris, France, where Mrs. Izard was met with the same social success she had known in other countries. She was admired at exclusive salons, her domestic life being given even greater note at these gatherings. A few months later, they were in Florence, Italy, Mr. Izard having been appointed Commissioner from Congress to the Grand Duke of Tuscany. He was always accompanied by Mrs. Izard, who was fond of adventure. With the outbreak of the American Revolution, Mrs. Izard was eager to return with her husband to the U.S., but the dangers of the voyage made the move impractical. In 1780, Mr. Izard returned to the U.S. while Mrs. Izard stayed in France with their children.

=== Return to the U.S. ===
Mrs. Izard brought her family back to the U.S. in 1783, where once more they took up their residence at The Elms. From 1789 to 1795, Mr. Izard represented South Carolina in the United States Senate.

During her husband's seven years of illness, she managed his affairs. This included the supervision of The Elms, a large estate. By this time, her children were grown, with the exception of one who had died, leaving her to care for her two orphan grandchildren. Mr. Izard died near Charleston on May 30, 1804, at the age of 62. He was interred in the churchyard of St. James Goose Creek Episcopal Church, near Charleston. Widowed, she removed to Philadelphia where she hosted dinner parties and other gatherings of the city's social elite.

== Personal life ==
In 1767, she married Ralph Izard. Through her marriage, she accepted very different views from her family as to the patriot cause. Her family members were staunch Loyalists, while Mr. Izard identified with Southern politics. However, Mrs. Izard was tactful, never letting politics interfere with her relationships.

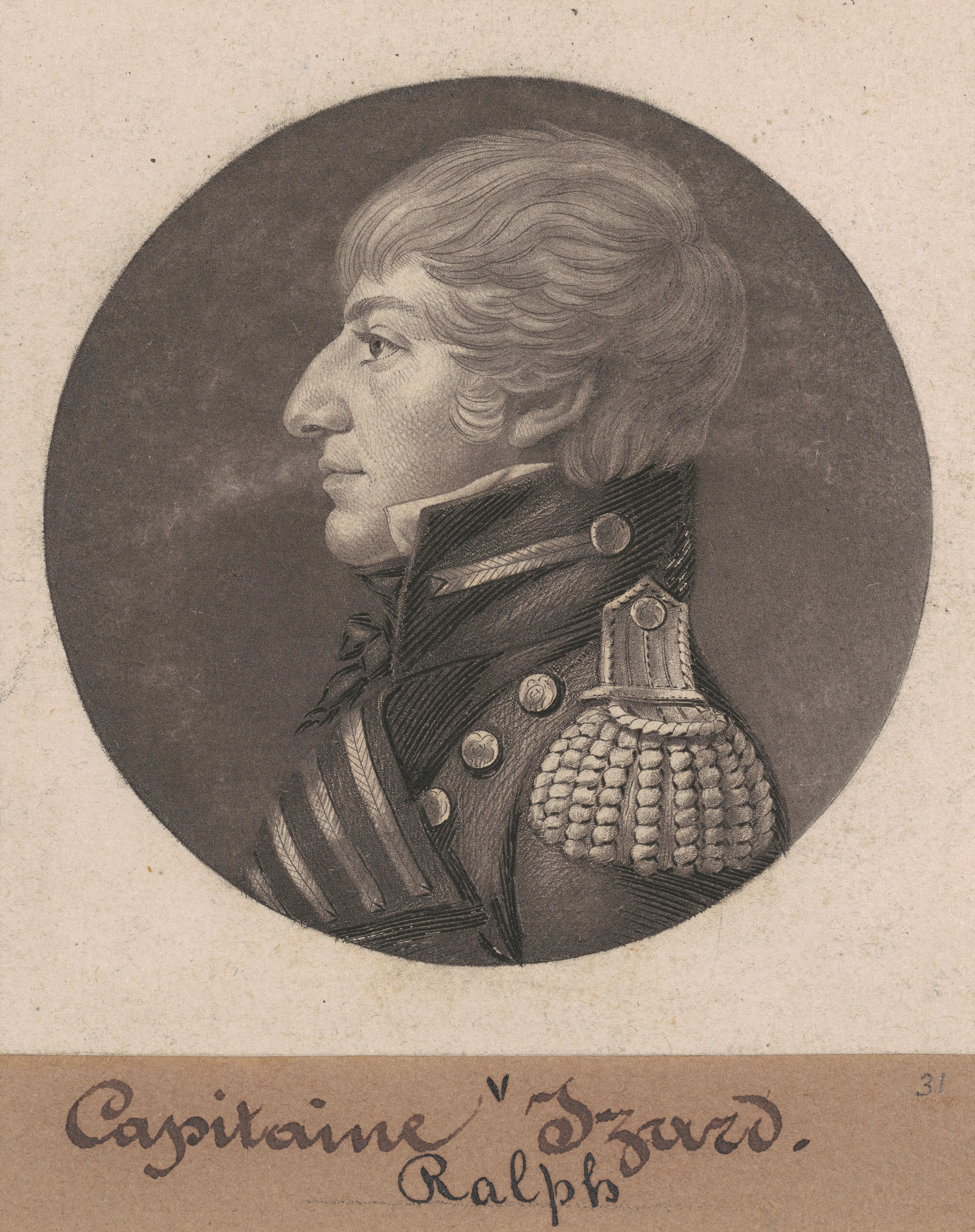
Ralph DeLancey Izard (son)

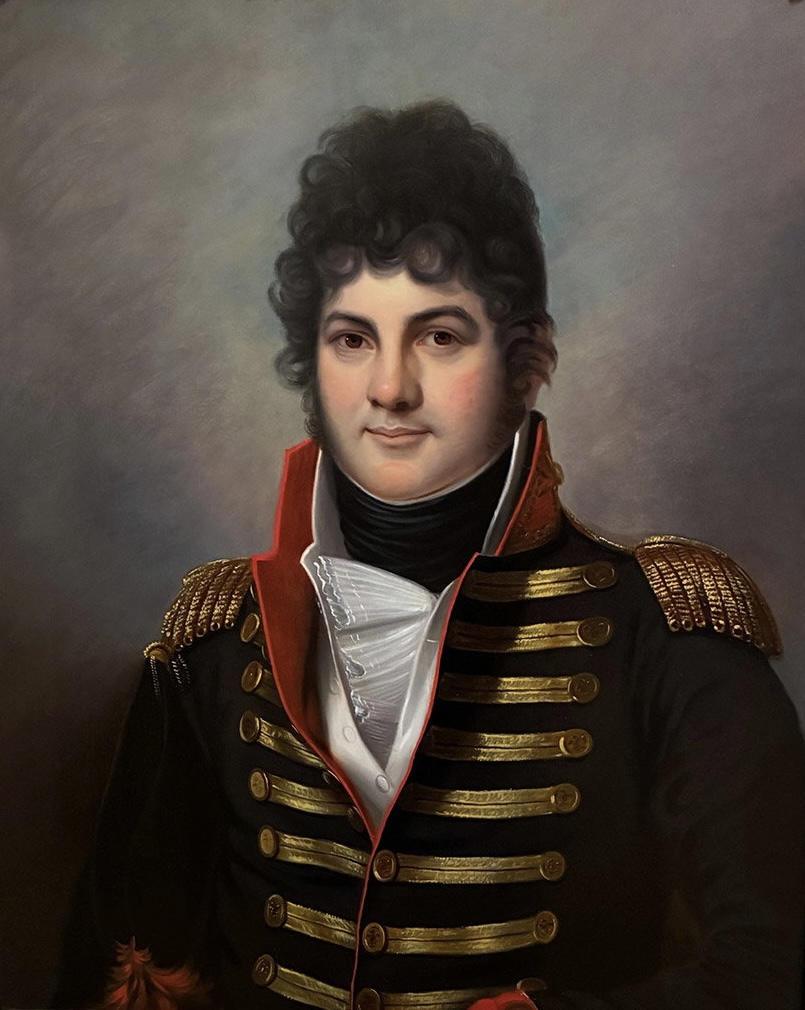
George Izard (son)

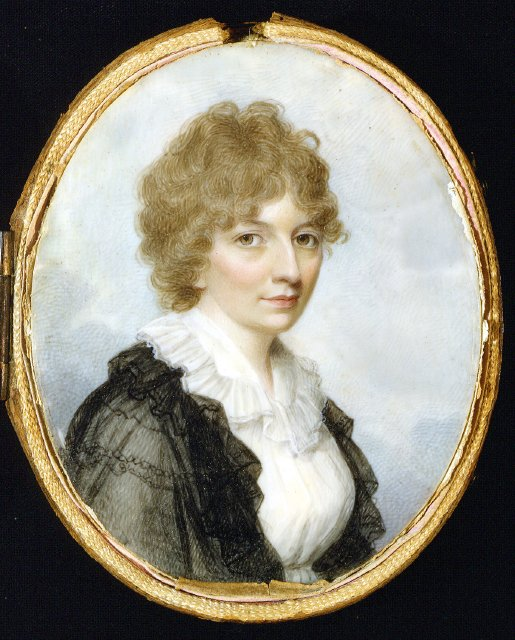
Margaret Izard Manigault (daughter)

The couple had fourteen children together, but only seven survived past early childhood, including:

- Ralph DeLancey Izard, a naval hero of Tripoli. The World War II USS Izard was named after him. In 1808, Izard married Eliza Pinckney, daughter of Major General Charles Cotesworth Pinckney, a signer of the Constitution, and a granddaughter of Colonel Charles Pinckney, Chief Justice of South Carolina. Ralph's wife was also a niece of Arthur Middleton.
- Major General George Izard, a governor of Arkansas.
- Anne Izard, who married William Allan Deas (1764–1863), with whom she had a son, Charles Deas, a painter. William's brother was Col. James Sutherland Deas (1784–1864) who was the father of CS General Zachariah C. Deas.
- Charlotte Izard, who married William Loughton Smith, a son of South Carolina Assemblyman Benjamin Smith; William L. Smith was also a brother-in-law of South Carolina Congressman Isaac Motte.
- Margaret Izard Manigault. Margaret's grandson was Charles Manigault Morris who was also a great-grandson of Lewis Morris. A cousin of Charles Manigault Morris was General Arthur Middleton Manigault.

Alice De Lancey Lizard died April 1, 1832, at the age of 87.

== Paintings ==
While she was a resident of London the portrait of her was painted by Thomas Gainsborough, R. A. In this portrait, she is simply gowned in white. The low-cut bodice is surplice fashioned and a pink rose with leaves and bud is added into the folds. The loose sleeves fall from sloping shoulders, being relieved where they are thrown back, with a bit of narrow lace. The waist is outlined by a blue tied scarf which contrasts with the roses tumbling from the basket held in her left hand. The natural oval of the face is accentuated by the towering hairstyle into which is twined a rope of pearls, the same jewels clasped at the throat. The forehead is high; the brow raised a trifle, the eyes blue, while the small ear set close to the head, the slim straight nose and mouth attest the beauty of the young matron. Upon the back of the canvas is inscribed: "Mrs. Alice Izard, formerly Alice De Lancey. Painted in London, by Gainsborough, in 1772."

Copley also presents this woman in a portrait of herself and husband, done when they were in Rome, in 1774. By the time the artist had completed his work, which is after the style of Reynolds, the Revolution was hovering over the Colonies, so Mr. Izard was unable to send payment from his South Carolina home, and was forced to leave the painting with Copley. For 50 years, it remained stored away in the attic of that family.

Later, she sat to Malbone for a miniature.
