= Ralph Izard =

American politician (1741/42-1804)

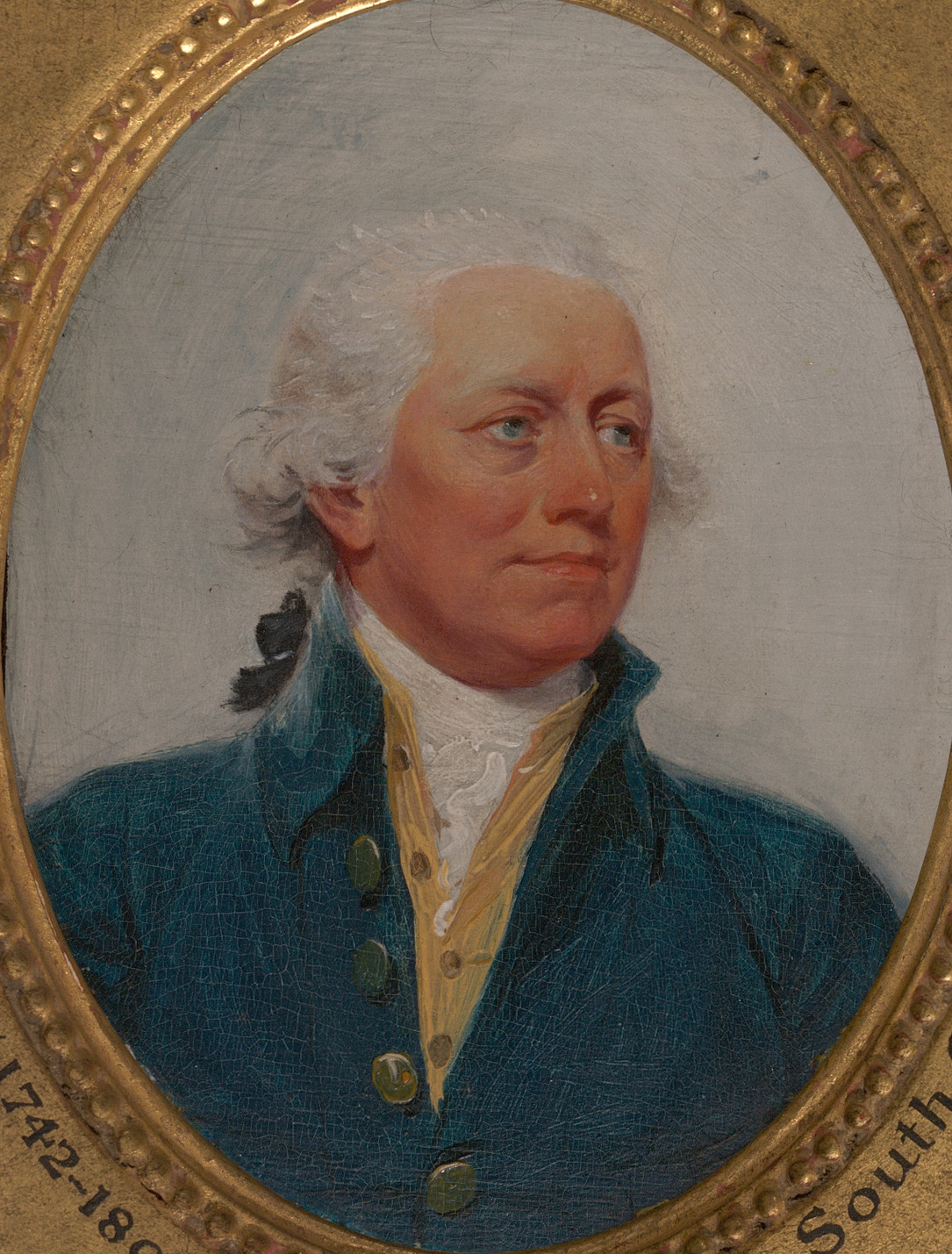
- Ralph Izard, 1793, by John Trumbull

President pro tempore of the United States Senate
- In office May 31, 1794 – November 9, 1794
- Preceded by: John Langdon
- Succeeded by: Henry Tazewell

United States Senator from South Carolina
- In office March 4, 1789 – March 3, 1795
- Preceded by: Position established
- Succeeded by: Jacob Read

Delegate from South Carolina to the Congress of the Confederation
- In office November 4, 1782 – November 1, 1783

Personal details
- Born: January 23, 1741 / 1742 near Charleston, South Carolina
- Died: May 30, 1804 (aged 62–63) near Charleston, South Carolina
- Party: Pro-Administration
- Spouse: Alice De Lancey Izard
- Children: Henry Izard; Ralph Izard; George Izard; Charlotte Izard
- Education: Trinity Hall, Cambridge
- Profession: Planter

Ralph Izard (January 23, 1741/1742 – May 30, 1804) was an American politician who served as president pro tempore of the United States Senate in 1794.

== Early life ==
Coat of Arms of Ralph Izard

Izard was born at "The Elms" near Charleston, South Carolina. He was the son of Henry Izard and Margaret Johnson.

He spent most of his childhood and youth studying in England: he attended a school in Hackney, London, and matriculated as a fellow-commoner at Trinity Hall, Cambridge. Izard returned to America in 1764, but did not remain in South Carolina for long. He was elected the American Society (later the American Philosophical Society) in 1768.

== Career ==
He resided in London in 1771 and moved to Paris in 1776. He was appointed commissioner to the Court of Tuscany by the Continental Congress in 1776, but was recalled in 1779. He returned to America in 1780 and pledged his large estate in South Carolina for the payment of war ships to be used in the American Revolutionary War. He was a member of the Continental Congress in 1782 and 1783. In 1788, he was elected to the United States Senate and served from March 4, 1789, to March 4, 1795, serving as President pro tempore of the Senate during the Third Congress. In August 1789, after the Senate rejected Benjamin Fishbourn for collector of Savannah, Georgia, President George Washington entered the Senate chamber and demanded to know why his nominee was rejected in unusual display of emotion. "The president showed [a] great want of temper... when one of his nominations was rejected," Izard wrote.

=== Later life ===
Izard was one of the founders of the College of Charleston. Izard retired from public life to the care of his estates in 1795. Within two years of his retirement, he was stricken with an untreatable illness that paralyzed him on one side of his body.

== Death and legacy ==
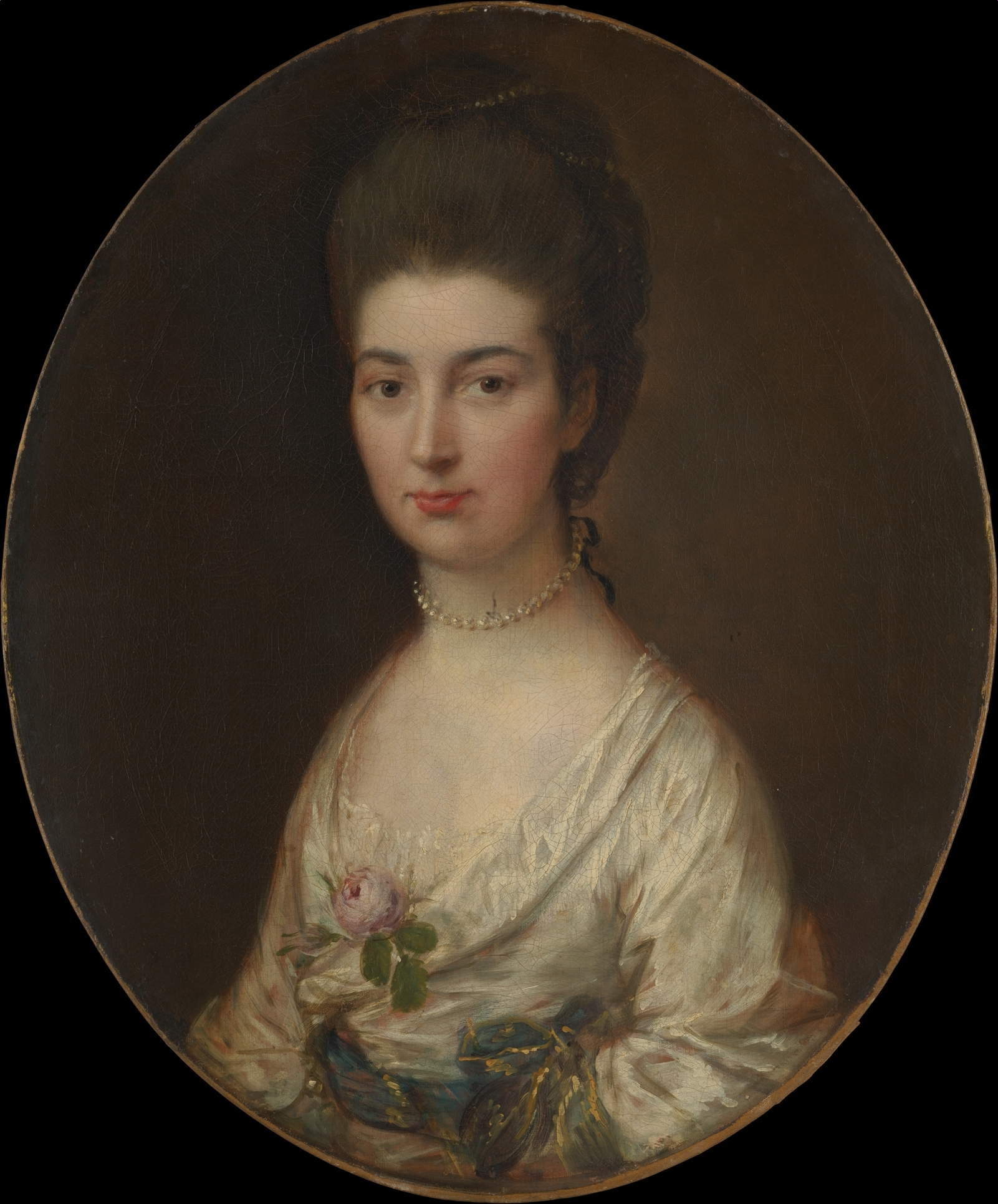
Alice De Lancey Izard, portrait by Thomas Gainsborough

In 1767, Izard married Alice De Lancey, who was a niece of James DeLancey and a descendant of Stephanus Van Cortlandt and Gertrude Schuyler. After Izard moved to America in 1780 to focus on his work towards the American Revolution, his family stayed in France until 1783 when they joined him in South Carolina. Izard and his wife had fourteen children together, but only seven survived past early childhood, including:

- Ralph Izard was a naval hero of Tripoli. The World War II USS Izard was named after him. In 1808, Izard married Eliza Pinckney, daughter of Major General Charles Cotesworth Pinckney, a signer of the Constitution, and a granddaughter of Colonel Charles Pinckney, chief justice of South Carolina. Ralph's wife was also a niece of Arthur Middleton.
- Major General George Izard was a governor of Arkansas.
- Anne Izard, who married William Allan Deas (1764-1863) with whom they had a son, the painter, Charles Deas. William's brother was Col. James Sutherland Deas {1784-1864} who was the father of CS General Zachariah Cantey Deas
- Charlotte Izard, who married William Loughton Smith, a son of S.C. Assemblyman Benjamin Smith; William L. Smith was also a brother-in-law of South Carolina Congressman Isaac Motte.

Izard died near Charleston on May 30, 1804, at the age of sixty-two. He is interred in the churchyard of St. James Goose Creek Episcopal Church, near Charleston.

Izard was a slaveholder.

=== Descendants ===
A great-grandson of Ralph Izard was Charles Manigault Morris who was also a great-grandson of Lewis Morris. A cousin of Charles Manigault Morris was General Arthur Middleton Manigault who was descended from Mary Izard-cousin of Ralph Izard.

A cousin Sarah Izard married South Carolina Loyalist Governor Lord William Campbell. A cousin twice removed was Elizabeth {Eliza} Izard who was a daughter-in-law of Congressman of South Carolina Thomas Pinckney. One niece Elizabeth Izard married Alexander Wright (1751–?), a son of Loyalist Governor of Georgia James Wright (governor).

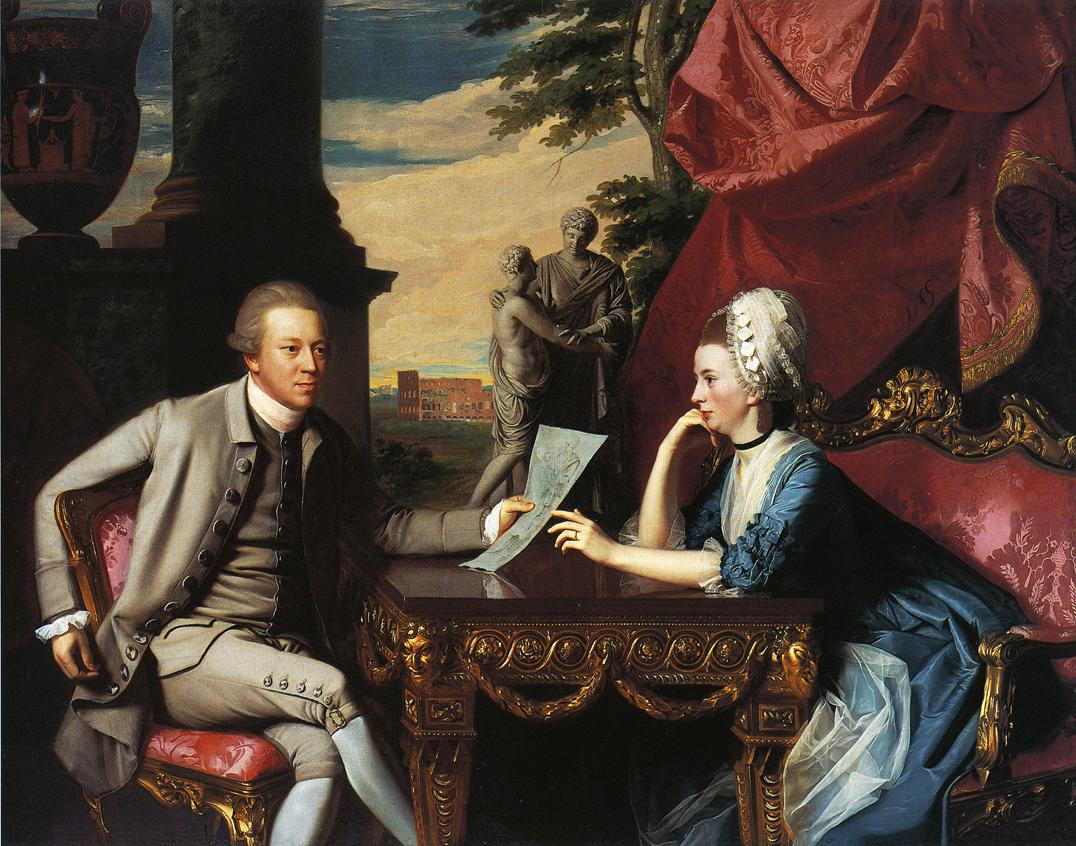
Ralph and Alice Izard by John Singleton Copley

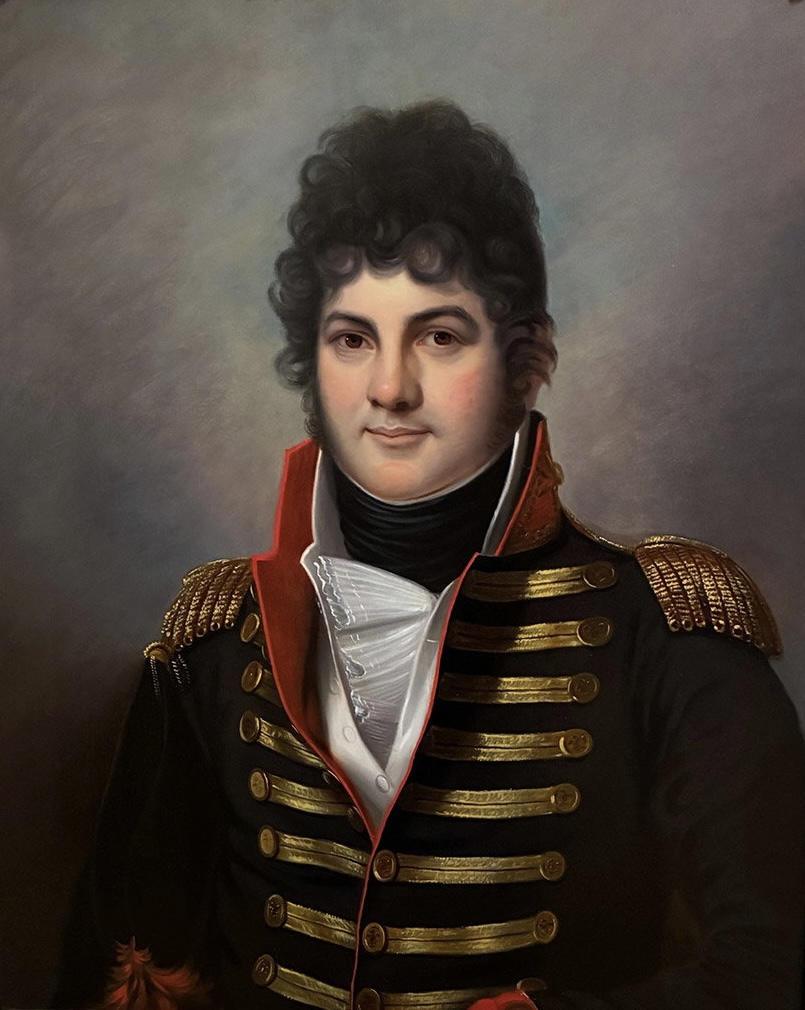
Governor George Izard by Charles Bird King

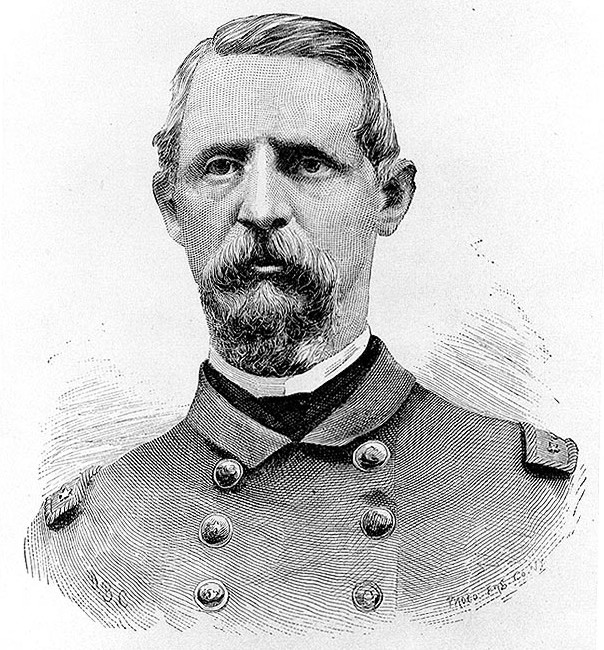
First Lieutenant Charles Manigault Morris, CSN

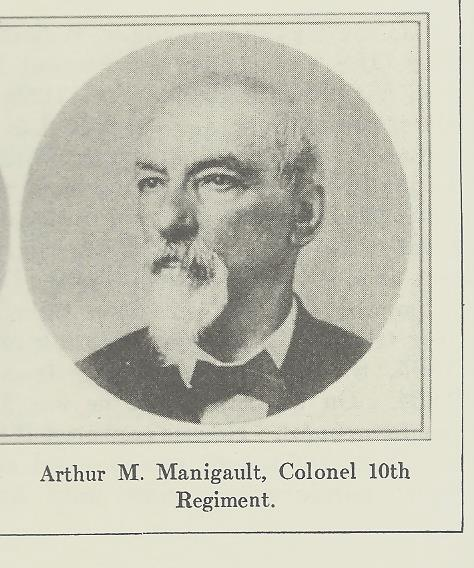
General Arthur M. Manigault, CSA

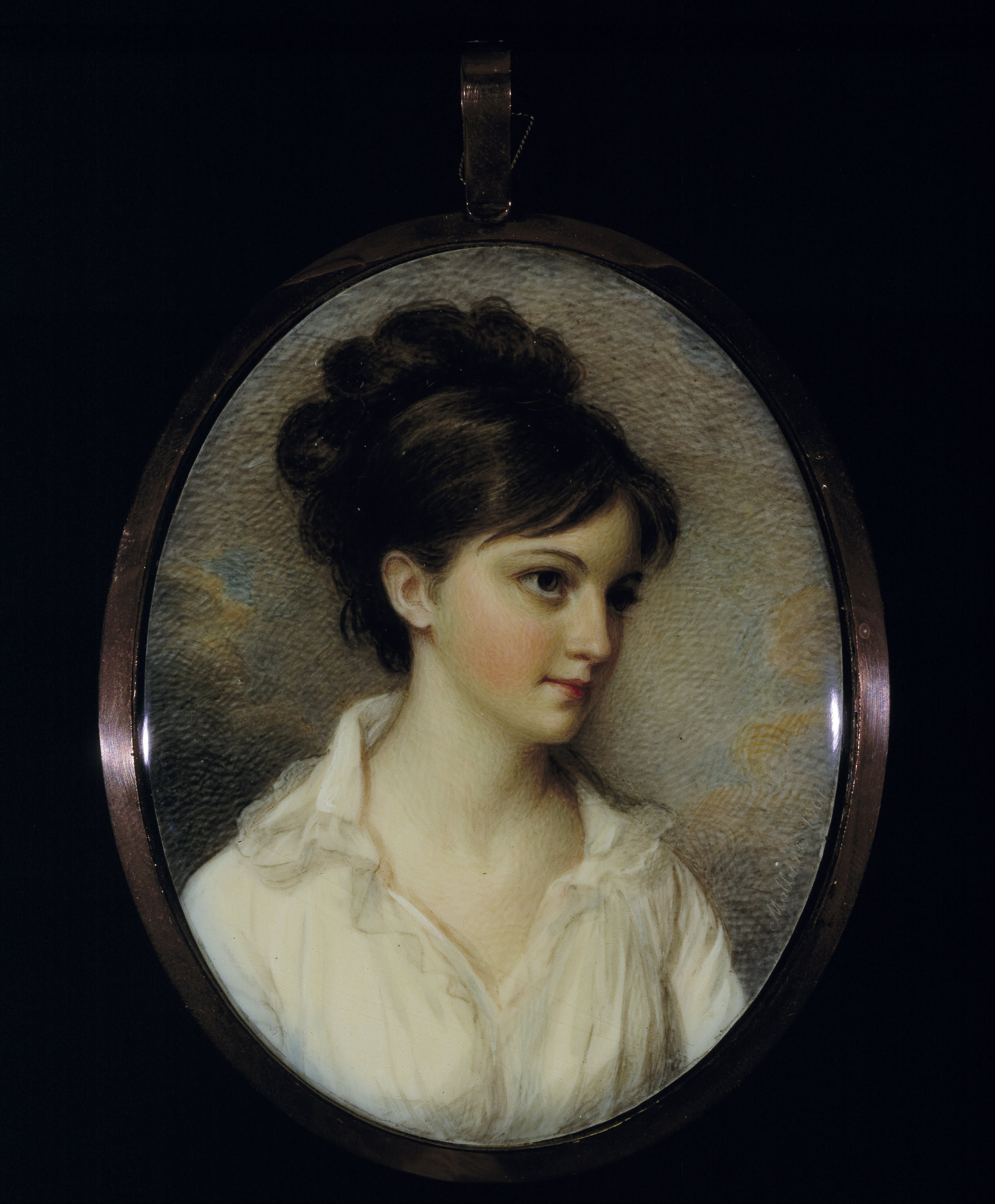
Miniature of Elizabeth (Eliza) Izard [wife of Thomas Pinckey 1780-1842 son of General Thomas Pinckney) by Edward Greene Malbone

U.S. Senate
Preceded by None	U.S. senator (Class 3) from South Carolina; 1789–1795; Served alongside: Pierce Butler	Succeeded by Jacob Read
Political offices
Preceded by John Langdon	President pro tempore of the United States Senate; May 31, 1794 – November 9, 1794	Succeeded by Henry Tazewell
