= James De Lancey (loyalist) =

Canadian politician (1746–1804)

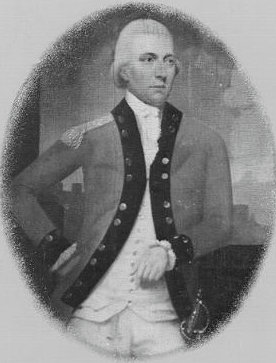
- Col. James De Lancey

Member of the General Assembly of Nova Scotia for the Town of Annapolis
- In office 1786–1793
- Preceded by: Stephen De Lancey
- Succeeded by: Thomas Henry Barclay

Sheriff of Westchester County
- In office 1769–1776

Personal details
- Born: September 6, 1746 Westchester County, Province of New York, British America
- Died: May 2, 1804 (aged 57) Round Hill, Nova Scotia, Canada
- Spouse: Martha Tippett (m. 1784)
- Relations: Stephen DeLancey (brother); Oliver DeLancey (brother); Alice De Lancey Izard (sister); James DeLancey (uncle); Oliver DeLancey (uncle); Etienne DeLancey (grandfather); Cadwallader Colden (grandfather); Thomas Barclay (brother-in-law)
- Children: 10
- Parent(s): Peter DeLancey; Elizabeth Colden
- Occupation: Sheriff, militia officer, farmer, politician

Colonel James De Lancey (Note: His surname also appears as Delancey, de Lancey or DeLancey.) (September 6, 1746 – May 2, 1804) was an American-born military officer and politician who led one of the best known and most feared of the loyalist units, De Lancey's Cowboys, during the American Revolutionary War. He was known as the "Outlaw of the Bronx." George Washington was well aware of James De Lancey’s activities and much desired his capture. He later became a political figure in Nova Scotia, representing Annapolis Township in the Nova Scotia House of Assembly from 1786 to 1794. He has become a controversial figure for unsuccessfully trying to use the courts to retrieve a slave he brought to Nova Scotia.

== Early life ==
He was born in Westchester County, New York, the son of Peter DeLancey and Elizabeth (née Colden) DeLancey. Among his siblings was brother Stephen DeLancey, also a member of the Nova Scotia Assembly, and sister Susan DeLancey, who was married to Thomas Henry Barclay, a lawyer who also became one of the United Empire Loyalists in Nova Scotia and served in the colony's government. Another sister, the socialite, Alice De Lancey Izard, married Ralph Izard, who later represented South Carolina in the United States Senate.

His paternal grandparents were French immigrant Etienne DeLancey and Anne (née Van Cortlandt) DeLancey, herself the third child of Gertrude (née Schuyler) Van Cortlandt and Stephanus Van Cortlandt, the Chief Justice of the Province of New York. His maternal grandfather, Cadwallader Colden, and his uncle, James DeLancey served as Colonial Governors of New York.

== Career ==
He served as sheriff of Westchester County from 1769 to 1776 and as an officer in the militia. Because of his loyalist sympathies, he was forced to leave the area and went to New York City, where his uncle, Oliver De Lancey, raised a loyalist military unit known as De Lancey's Brigade. James commanded his own, irregular guerrilla unit, known as De Lancey's Raiders, De Lancey's Refugees, Westchester Refugees, and the "Cowboys" or "Cow-boys." His much-feared partisans harassed the enemy near New York City and procured supplies for the British army by conducting cattle raids. James acquired the sobriquet “Outlaw of the Bronx” (De Lancey had his headquarters near the Bronx River.)

Forces under James De Lancey ambushed and killed Colonel Christopher Greene and Major Ebenezer Flagg of the Rhode Island Regiment of the Continental Army at the Battle of Pine's Bridge on May 14, 1781. From one account of the attack, "his body was found in the woods, about a mile distant from his tent, cut, and mangled in the most shocking way". According to historian Otto Hufeland, "it was one of the few expeditions in which Colonel Delancey himself took part." The Cowboys often operated under the broader umbrella of the De Lancey name and worked closely with his uncle's De Lancey's Brigade.

=== Nova Scotia ===
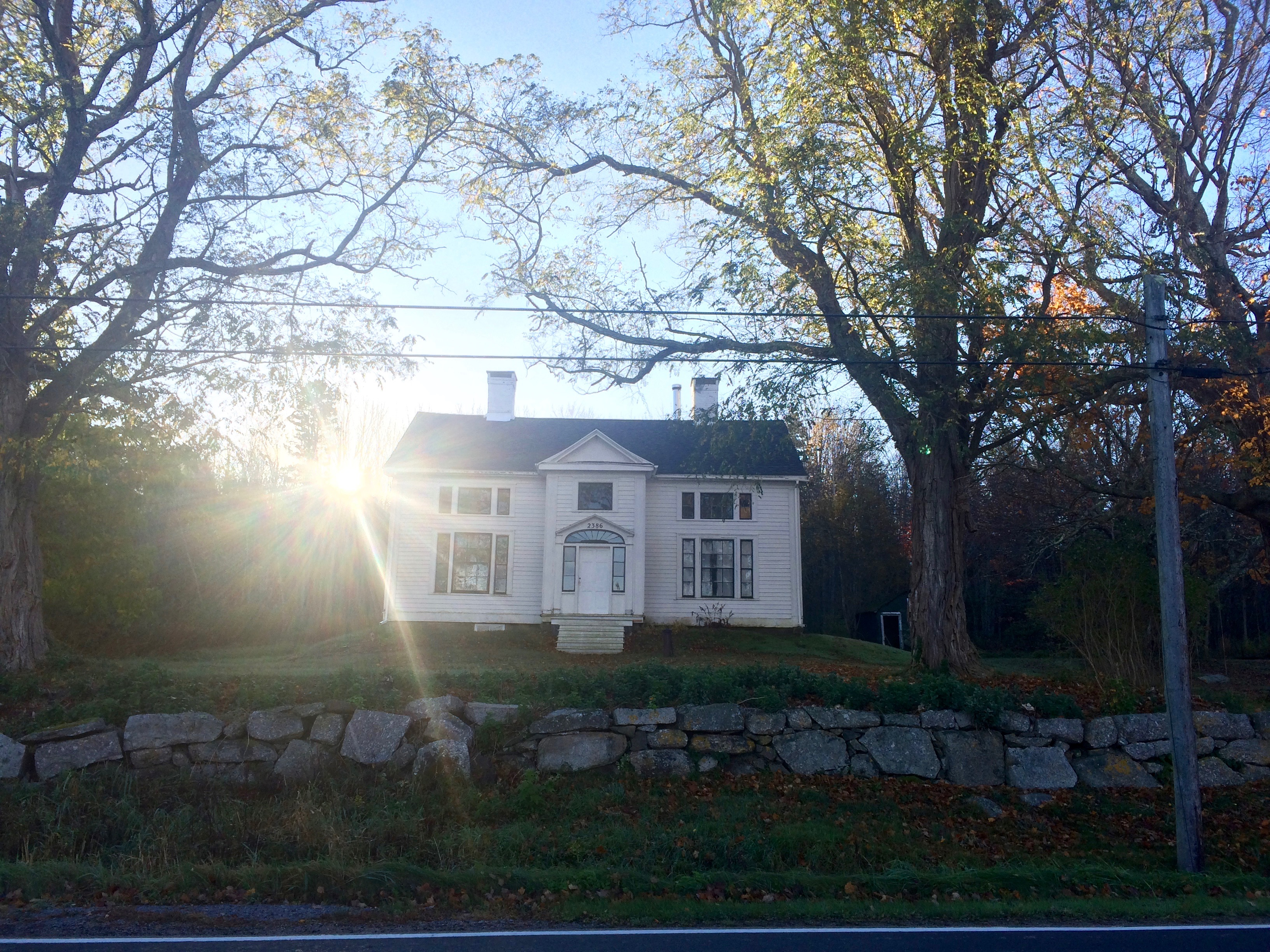
His historic house sits prominently on a knoll with views of the Annapolis River.

Around the start of 1783, following the Patriot victory in the American Revolution, he moved to Nova Scotia, settling at Round Hill in Annapolis County. De Lancey was elected to the provincial assembly after his brother Stephen accepted an office in the Bahamas. James took his seat representing Annapolis Township from Feb. 26, 1790, until he was named to the province's Council in 1794 by Governor Wentworth.

He resigned from his seat on the council in 1801 due to poor health. A slave owner, he was thwarted by Richard John Uniacke in his efforts to have slavery legally recognized in Nova Scotia.

== Personal life ==
James De Lancey was second cousin of Philip Van Cortlandt, who was Brigadier General in Washington's Continental Army.

In 1784, he married Martha Tippett, the daughter of William Tippett and Martha (née Hunt) Tippett. Together, they had six sons and four daughters.

De Lancey died at Round Hill three years after resigning from the Council on May 2, 1804, at the age of 57. There is a prominent monument marking the burial ground.
