= Conversation with the Marèchale de *** =

1774 essay by Denis Diderot

Conversation with the Maréchale de *** (or Conversation with a Christian Lady, French: Entretien d'un philosophe avec la maréchale de ***) is a 1774 essay by Denis Diderot containing a friendly dialogue, of a disputatious nature, between a religious lady and a freethinker, on theological issues. The content of the dialogue is polemical, but its tone has been variously described by modern commentators as being gentle, graceful, gracious, charming, witty and urbane. A Dutch publisher, to whom Diderot initially sent the manuscript, rejected it on the ground that it was too inflammatory. It was eventually published under an assumed name.

== Background ==
The essay was composed in 1774, as Diderot was returning from Russia. The dialogue is believed to have been modeled on an actual conversation Diderot had with the Marèchale de Broglie at the time he was negotiating the purchase of the Crozat collection for Catherine the Great. Some of the content may have also been sourced from some conversations Diderot had with his hostess in The Hague.

The fundamental question addressed in the dialogue is a familiar one: does God exist? It is suggested that Diderot's experiences in Germany, Russia, and Netherlands motivated him to write the essay since he learnt that resistance to materialistic thinking was much more tenacious than he had earlier imagined.

== Content ==
The essay begins with a dialogue between an Italian freethinker Tomasso Crudeli, representing the viewpoint of Diderot, and the Marèchale who is described as an attractive, virtuous, and pious lady. The lady is astonished that a person like Crudeli, who has no religious belief, should have the moral principles of a believer. "What! You do not steal, you do not murder, you do not pillage," she asks Crudeli-Diderot. "Very rarely," is the reply. Crudeli-Diderot then goes on to mischievously state that there is no reason for a religious person, who is also honest, to not be as high principled as a freethinker like himself.

The lady states that she expects to be rewarded for the virtuous life she is now leading; had she not been convinced of the rewards and punishments for her conduct that awaited her in the afterlife she may have been tempted to indulge in wrongdoing. Crudeli-Diderot gives a parable of a young Mexican who has fallen asleep on a raft in the ocean. When he wakes up he finds he is in a distant land where he is welcomed by a venerable old man who is the ruler here. The argument is that if God does exist then he would forgive the individual for not having believed in His existence.

Crudeli-Diderot says that believers are guided more by their passions than by their religious belief. He argues that the religious views of the lady are, in the final analysis, utilitarian and pragmatic. The lady says that she is unable to answer him, but is also unable to accept his viewpoint. Crudeli-Diderot replies that he has no intention of changing her views. Religion is like marriage, he says. Just as marriage makes many people happy, so it has made her happy. Similarly, religion has made her a better person; so it is best for her to continue to be a religious person. "It is sweet to you to imagine beside you and above your head a great and powerful being, who sees you walking the earth; the idea steadies your footsteps. Continue, madame, to enjoy this august guarantor of your thoughts, this spectator, this sublime model for your actions," says Crudely-Diderot. The lady then says: "You seem to have no mania for proselytism." "Absolutely not," is Crudeli-Diderot's reply.

== Reception ==
The views expressed in the essay have been described as "old acquaintances." The distinctive feature here is the gentle and friendly tone of the argument which makes it seem much less polemical than it actually is. It is suggested that the conversation could be taken as a model for the kind of talk that would take place in the salons in eighteenth century Paris.
