= Ralph Izard (naval officer) =

US Navy officer (1785–1822)

- Born: February 26, 1785
- Died: January 21, 1822 (aged 36)
- Allegiance: United States
- Branch: United States Navy
- Service years: 1799–1822
- Conflicts: Barbary Wars
- Spouse: Eliza Pinckney (m. 1808)
- Parents: Ralph Izard (father); Alice De Lancey Izard (mother)

Ralph DeLancey Izard (26 February 1785 – 21 January 1822) was a United States Navy officer who became a hero for his actions at Tripoli, during the Barbary Wars. The destroyer USS Izard (DD-589) was named after him.

== Early service ==
Ralph DeLancey Izard was born 26 February 1785 at Charleston, South Carolina, the son of a prominent political family. His mother was Alice De Lancey Izard, and his father was Senator Ralph Izard, who served as a delegate to the Continental Congress (1782–1783), U.S. Senator from South Carolina (1789–1795), and was President pro tempore of the United States Senate.

Ralph was appointed Midshipman 2 October 1799.

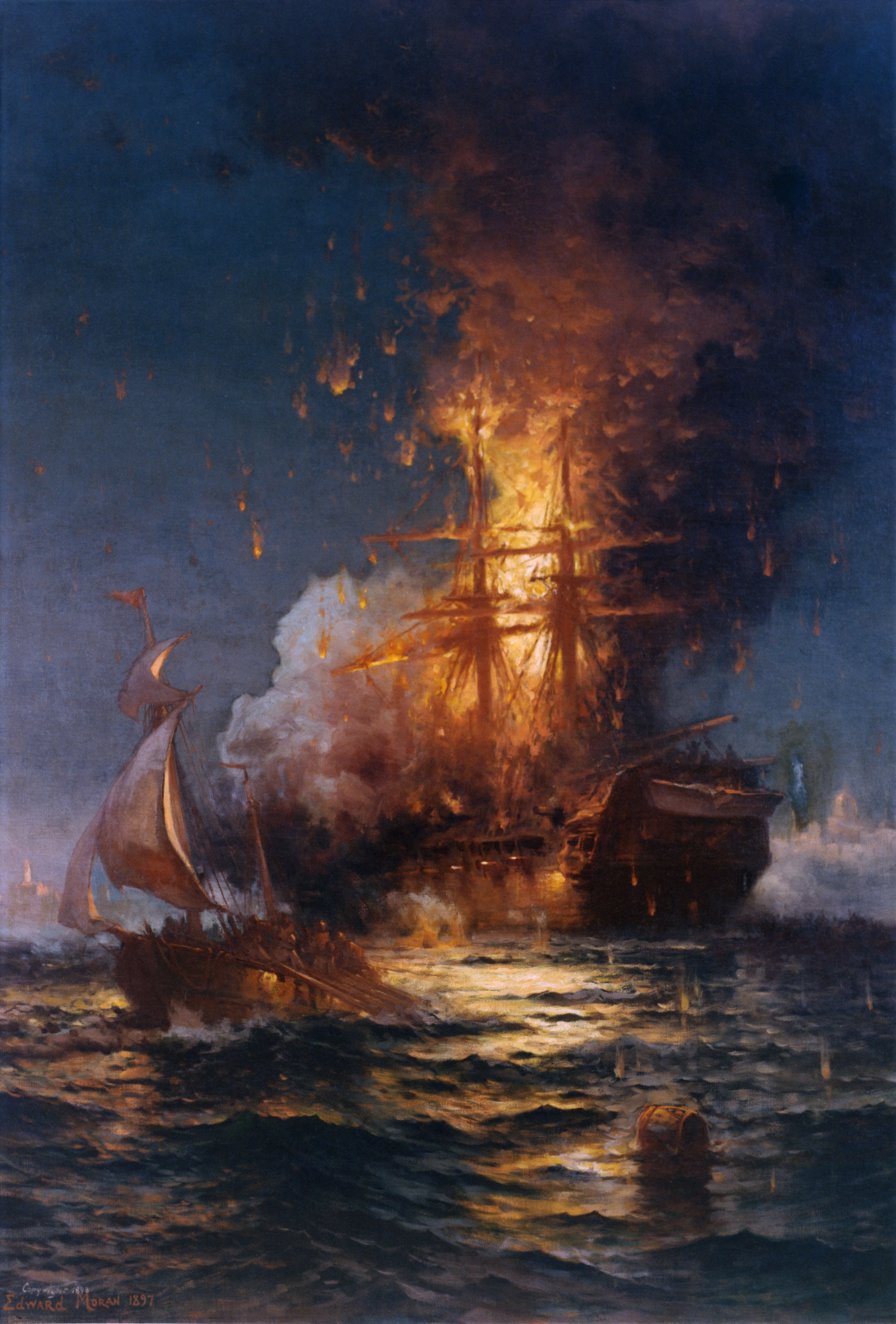
Burning of the frigate Philadelphia in the harbor of Tripoli, February 16, 1804, by Edward Moran, painted 1897.

== The Burning of the Philadelphia ==
Izard volunteered and took part in the expedition under Lieutenant Stephen Decatur, commanding the ketch Intrepid, which entered the harbor of Tripoli 16 February 1804 and destroyed the captured U.S. frigate Philadelphia in what Lord Nelson called the most daring act of the age. Izard was assigned duty under Lt. Decatur, with Midshipman John Rowe and 15 men, to hold the spar deck.

== Later duty ==
He also took part in the attacks on Tripoli during August and September 1804 as part of Commodore Edward Preble's squadron. He was promoted to Lieutenant on 27 January 1807. Lt. Izard died 21 January 1822 at Charleston, South Carolina.

== Marriage ==
Coat of Arms of Ralph Izard

In 1808, Izard married Eliza Pinckney, daughter of Maj-Gen Charles Cotesworth Pinckney, signatory to the Constitution, and a granddaughter of Col Charles Pinckney, chief justice of South Carolina.

== Namesake ==
The destroyer Izard was launched and named in Lt. Izard's honor on 8 August 1942. She served in the Pacific during World War II, including the battles of Kwajalein, the Philippine Sea, Leyte, and Iwo Jima, among others. She received 10 battle stars for service.
