= George Izard =

2nd governor of Arkansas Territory from 1825 to 1828

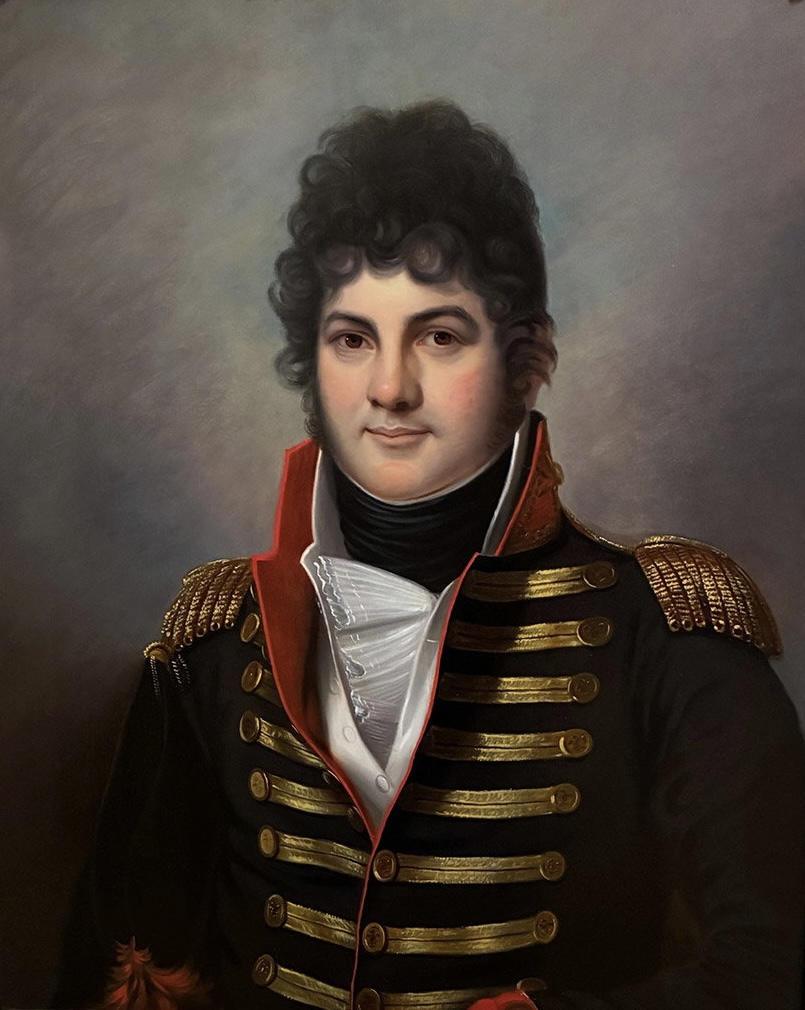
- Posthumous portrait by Charles Bird King, c. 1862

2nd Governor of Arkansas Territory
- In office March 4, 1825 – November 22, 1828
- President: James Monroe; John Quincy Adams
- Preceded by: James Miller
- Succeeded by: John Pope

Personal details
- Born: October 21, 1776 Richmond, England
- Died: November 22, 1828 (aged 52) Little Rock, Arkansas Territory
- Cause of death: Gout
- Resting place: Mount Holly Cemetery, Little Rock; 34°44′15.3″N 92°16′42.5″W
- Party: Democratic-Republican Party
- Spouse: Elizabeth Carter Izard (m. 1803)
- Parent(s): Ralph Izard and Alice DeLancey
- Education: College of Philadelphia
- Occupation: Military engineer; politician

Military service
- Allegiance: United States
- Branch: United States Army
- Years of service: 1795–1803; 1812–1815
- Rank: Major-General
- Wars: War of 1812

George Izard (October 21, 1776 – November 22, 1828) was a senior officer of the United States Army who served as the second governor of Arkansas Territory from 1825 to 1828. He was elected as a member to the American Philosophical Society in 1807.

== Early life and education ==
George Izard was born in Richmond, England, to Ralph Izard, who was a delegate to the Continental Congress and United States Senator from South Carolina, and Alice DeLancey, niece of New York Governor James DeLancey and a descendant of Stephanus Van Cortlandt and Gertrude Schuyler. He graduated from the College of Philadelphia (present-day University of Pennsylvania) in 1792. He attended military academies in England and Germany and received military engineering instruction in France.

== Military career ==
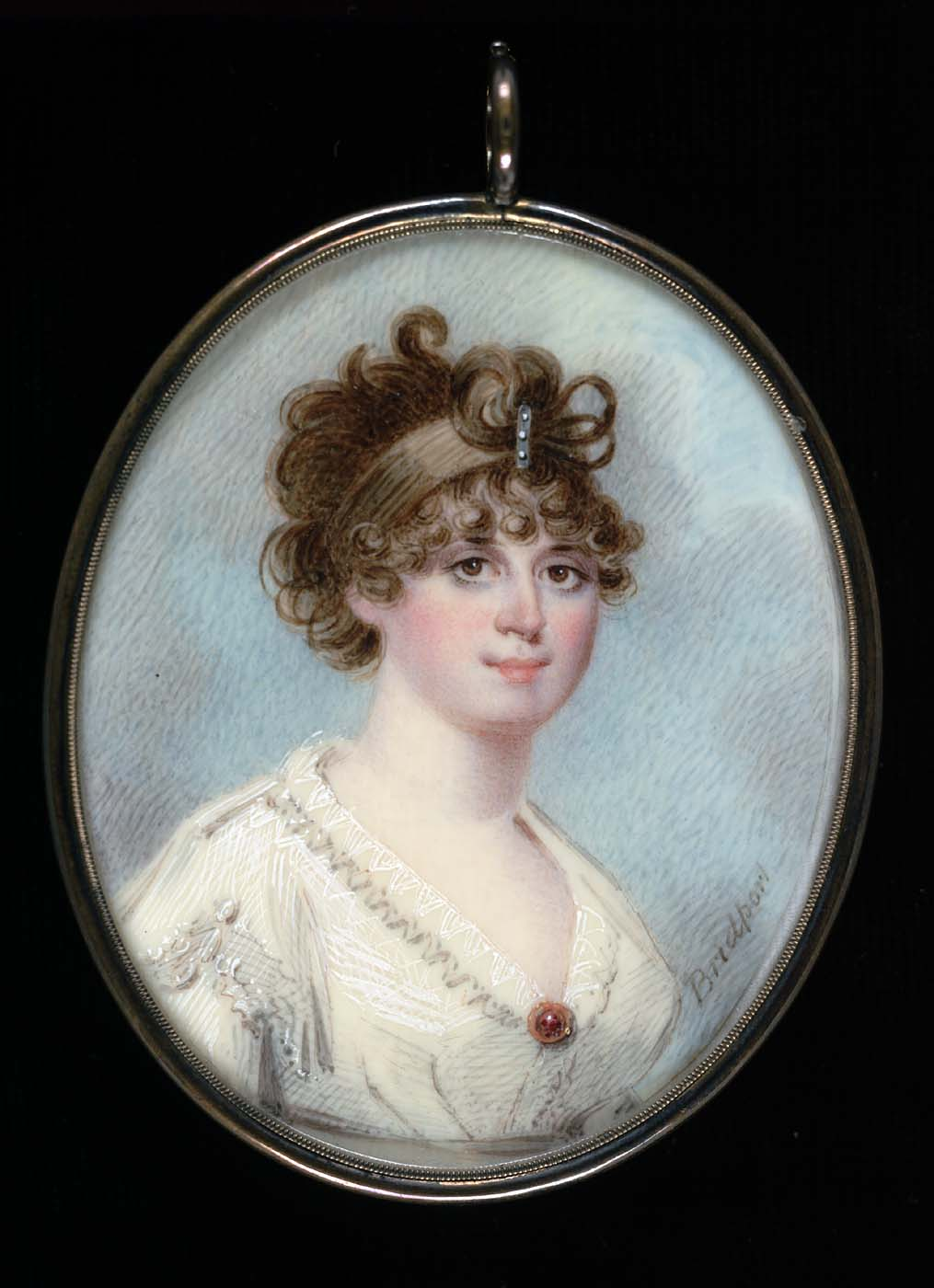
Elizabeth Carter Izard

On November 4, 1794, Izard was commissioned a Lieutenant in the newly established U.S. Corps of Artillerists and Engineers. Returning from Europe, he was assigned to an engineer company at West Point, New York. From there, he was ordered to oversee the construction of Castle Pinckney in South Carolina.

In January 1800, Izard became aide-de-camp to Army commander Alexander Hamilton. A few months later he was invited by William Loughton Smith, Minister Plenipotentiary to Portugal, to serve as his secretary, a position he accepted. He left Portugal the next year and returned to the United States. He officially resigned his army commission in June 1803.

In March 1812, Izard was appointed as Colonel of the newly organised 2d Artillery Regiment. He was promoted to Brigadier-General a year later, and served as Wade Hampton's second in command until his resignation, when Izard succeeded him. Promoted to Major-General in January 1814, he was in charge of the Northern Army protecting Lake Champlain, until ordered to reinforce the Army of Niagara. He was discharged in June 1815.

== Governor of Arkansas Territory (1825–1828) ==
Izard was appointed Governor of Arkansas Territory in March 1825, and served until his death in 1828. He died of complications of gout in Little Rock. Originally buried near the Peabody School there, Izard's remains were moved to Mount Holly Cemetery in 1843.

== Legacy ==
Izard County, Arkansas, is named after him. The unit he commanded still exists as 1st Battalion, 3d Air Defense Artillery Regiment.

== See also ==
- List of governors of Arkansas
- List of University of Pennsylvania people

Political offices
Preceded by James Miller	Governor of Arkansas Territory; 1825–1828	Succeeded by John Pope
