= Stephen De Lancey =

Lawyer and politician (1738–1809)

Stephen Delancey
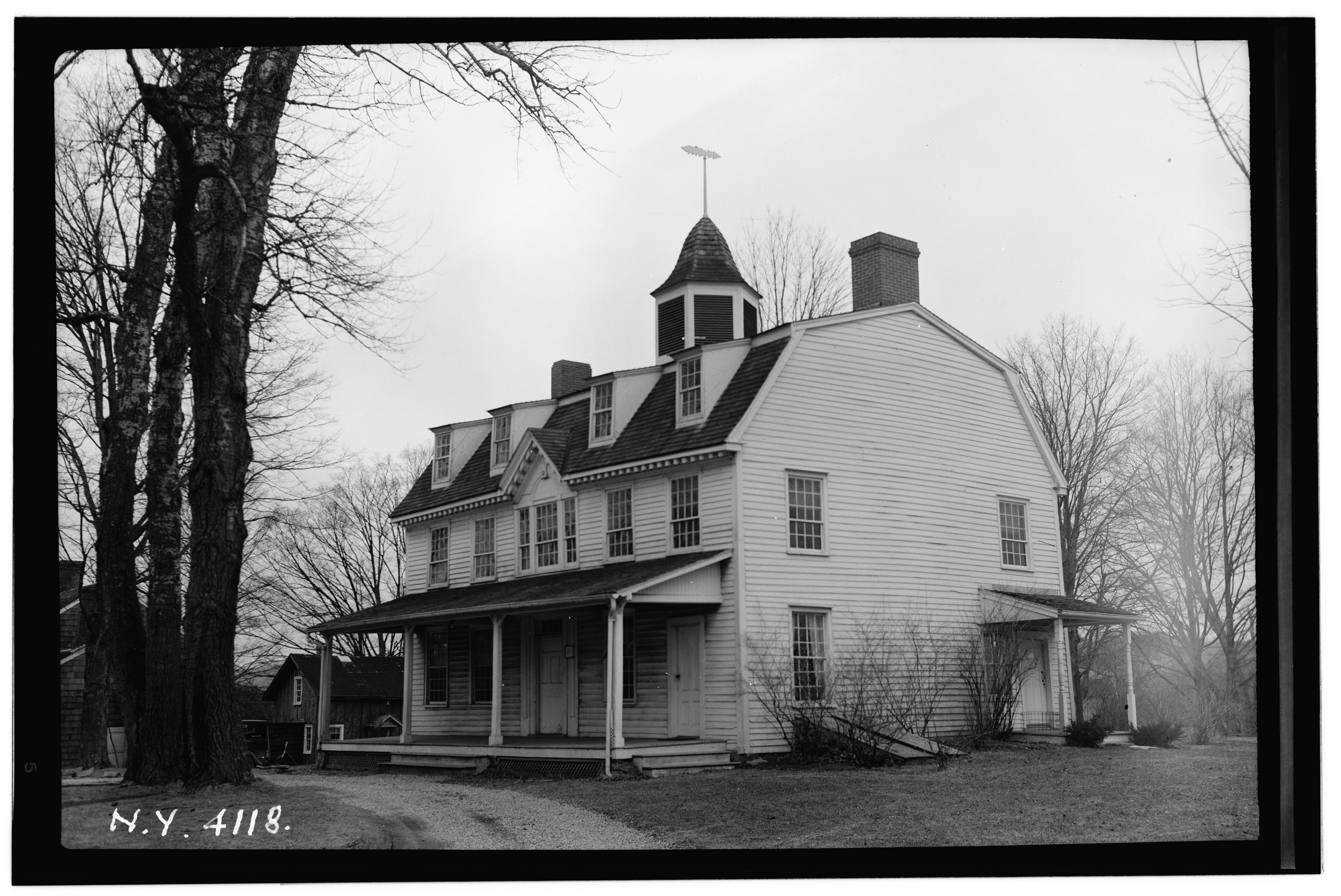
- House of Stephen Delancey in Westchester County, later known as the historic North Salem Town Hall

Member of the General Assembly of Nova Scotia for the Town of Annapolis
- In office 1784–1786
- Preceded by: Obadiah Wheelock
- Succeeded by: James De Lancey

Personal details
- Born: December 1738 West Farms, Province of New York, British America
- Died: May 1, 1809 (aged 70) Annapolis, Nova Scotia, Canada
- Spouse: Esther Rynderts
- Relations: James De Lancey (brother); Alice De Lancey Izard (sister); Thomas Barclay (brother-in-law); James De Lancey (uncle); Etienne de Lancey (grandfather); Cadwallader Colden (grandfather)
- Children: 3
- Parent(s): Peter DeLancey; Elizabeth Colden

Stephen De Lancey (December 1738 – May 1809) was a lawyer and political figure in New York state and Nova Scotia. He represented Annapolis Township in the Nova Scotia House of Assembly from 1784 to 1789.

== Early life ==
He was born in West Farms, New York, the eldest son of Peter De Lancey (1705–1770) and Elizabeth (née Colden) DeLancey. His sister, Susan De Lancey (1754–1837), was married to Thomas Henry Barclay (1753–1830), a lawyer who became one of the United Empire Loyalists in Nova Scotia and served in the colony's government.

His paternal grandparents were Etienne de Lancey and Anne Van Cortlandt (1676–1724), herself the third child of Gertrude Schuyler (born 1654) and Stephanus Van Cortlandt (1643–1700), the Chief Justice of the Province of New York. Both his uncle, James De Lancey (1703–1760), and maternal grandfather, Cadwallader Colden (1688–1776), served as Colonial Governors of New York.

== Career ==
He studied law and later moved to Albany. From 1765 to 1766, he served as clerk for the city and county of Albany. In 1770, he was named a masters in the provincial chancery court. He was elected to the Albany committee of correspondence in 1775.

=== Nova Scotia ===
In 1776, because of his Loyalist sympathies, he was stripped of his posts and deported to Hartford, Connecticut. In 1783, he moved to Nova Scotia with his family. He was first elected to the provincial assembly in a by-election held in 1783, taking the seat on November 16, 1784, and was elected again in 1785. There is a website claiming that in 1786, he was named to the province's Council, however he does not appear in a list of their members. A more reliable source reports that he was appointed to office in the Bahamas, and his seat was declared vacant April 6, 1789. His brother James won a by-election to replace him in the provincial assembly, and he took the seat on February 26, 1790. James was indeed named a member of the Council on June 6, 1794, and this may be the source of confusion.

== Personal life ==
De Lancey was married to Esther Rynderts of Albany. Together, they were the parents of three children:

- Elizabeth De Lancey
- Mary De Lancey
- Cadwallader De Lancey

Through his grandmother, Anne Van Cortlandt, he was a descendant of the owners of Van Cortlandt Manor, once the largest landholding in northern Westchester. Around 1770, he decided to build for himself a manor house in Westchester (in what is now North Salem) that would measure up to that of the Van Cortlandts. He moved into the graceful Georgian-style house in 1773, but had to leave his new residence and move to New York City just months later amid growing political tensions on the eve of the American Revolutionary War. He eventually emigrated to Canada. The house was appropriated by local Patriots in 1776 and later served as a courthouse, jail, private school, and town hall.

De Lancey died in Annapolis Royal, Nova Scotia, at the age of 70. North Salem Town Hall, once De Lancey's Westchester house, was added to the National Register of Historic Places in 1980.
