= Charles Deas =

American painter

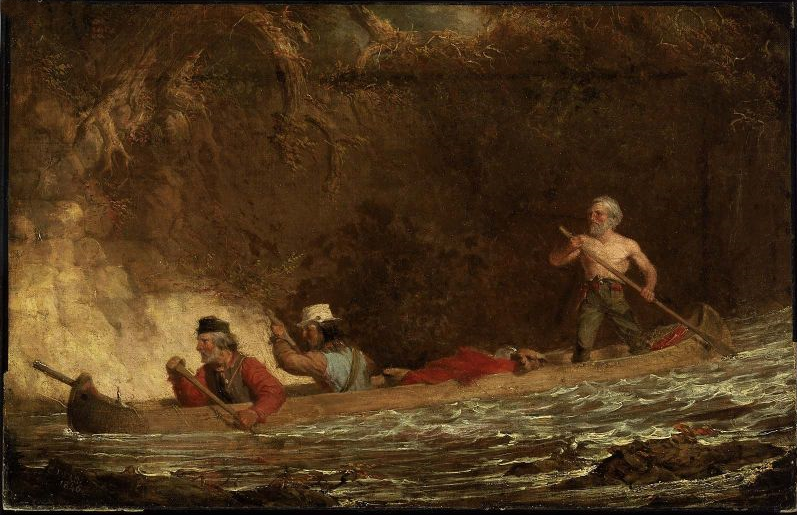
- The Voyageurs (1846) by Charles Deas
- Born: December 22, 1818; Philadelphia, Pennsylvania, U.S.
- Died: March 23, 1867 (aged 48); Manhattan, New York City, U.S.
- Known for: painting

Charles Deas (December 22, 1818 – March 23, 1867) was an American painter noted for his oil paintings of Native Americans and fur trappers of the mid-19th century.

== Early life ==
Charles Deas was born in Philadelphia, Pennsylvania. He was a son of William Allan Deas (1764–1863) and Anne (née Izard) Deas (1764–1863), a daughter of the 18th-century American politician Ralph Izard of South Carolina and his wife, Alice De Lancey Izard.

He attempted, and failed, to obtain an appointment to the United States Military Academy at West Point, New York. As a young man, he studied under John Sanderson in Philadelphia and subsequently embarked upon a career as a painter. The National Academy of Design in New York soon recognized his work, electing him as an associate member in 1839.

== Career ==
By 1840, he had decided to emulate one of his influences, George Catlin, and travel westward in the United States. It was during travels through the Wisconsin Territory that he became a noted painter of trappers and American Indians. By 1841, Deas had decided to establish his base in St. Louis, Missouri. During this time, Deas would typically spend "a few months among the Indian tribes, familiarizing himself with their manners and customs."

The artist's works are described as expressing "psychological tension, perceived danger, alarm, and flight," epitomized by his painting Death Struggle, which depicts an Indian and trapper locked in combat while falling to their deaths from a cliff.

Deas was most famous while he was still alive. One critic, in 1947, stated that the painter was considered to have "enjoyed more of a reputation during his own lifetime" than currently. Between 1841 and 1848, Deas regularly exhibited his works in St. Louis at the "Mechanics Fairs." He also shipped many of his works for sale to the Pennsylvania Academy of Fine Arts as well as to New York's American Art Union.

Deas returned to New York in 1848 and expressed a desire to open a gallery of Indian art. Before he could do this, he was declared legally insane. While he was institutionalized, his paintings were described as being particularly intense. "One of his wild pictures, representing a black sea, over which a figure hung, suspended by a ring, while from the waves a monster was springing, was so horrible, that a sensitive artist fainted at the sight."

== Personal life ==
On May 23, 1848, Deas was committed to New York's Bloomingdale Asylum (a site now occupied by Columbia University). He was institutionalized for the rest of his life.

Deas died of "apoplexy" (possible stroke) in Bloomingdale Asylum on March 23, 1867.

== Selected works ==
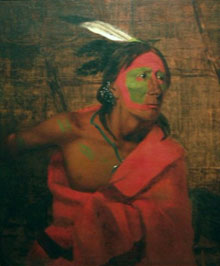
Wa-kon-cha-hi-re-ga (1840) by Charles Deas

- Robert Watts, Jr. (1838), oil on canvas, St. Louis Mercantile Library
- Walking the Chalk (1838), oil on canvas, Houston Museum of Fine Arts
- Turkey Shooting (1838), oil on canvas, Virginia Museum of Fine Arts
- Self Portrait (1840), graphite on buff wove paper, National Academy
- Wa-kon-cha-hi-re-ga (1840), oil on canvas, St. Louis Mercantile Library
- Winnebago with Peace Medal and Red Pipestone (1840), oil on canvas, St. Louis Mercantile Library
- Winnebago with Bear-Claw Necklace (1840), oil on canvas, St. Louis Mercantile Library
- Winnebago with Bear-Claw Necklace and Gun-Stock Club (1840), oil on canvas, St. Louis Mercantile Library
- Winnebagos Playing Checkers (1842), private collection
- Devil and Tom Walker, (1843), oil on canvas, private collection
- Long Jakes (1844), oil on canvas, Denver Art Museum
- Dragoons Crossing River (1844), private collection
- The Death Struggle (1845), oil on canvas, Shelburne Museum
- A Group of Sioux, (1845), oil on canvas, Amon Carter Museum
- The Trapper and His Family, (1845), Boston Museum of Fine Arts
- The Voyageurs, (1846), oil on canvas, Boston Museum of Fine Arts
- Prairie Fire, (1847), oil on canvas, Brooklyn Museum
- Indian Warrior on the Edge of a Precipice (1847)

== Bibliography ==
- Clark, Carol et al. Charles Deas and 1840s America, Norman : University of Oklahoma Press, 2009. (ISBN 9780806140308) (OCLC 258767488)
- Tuckerman, Henry T., "Deas" IN Artist-life: or, Sketches of American painters, New York: D. Appleton & Company, 1847. pp. 202–214. (OCLC 813736)
