= Charles Manigault Morris =

United States and Confederate Navy officer (1820–1895)

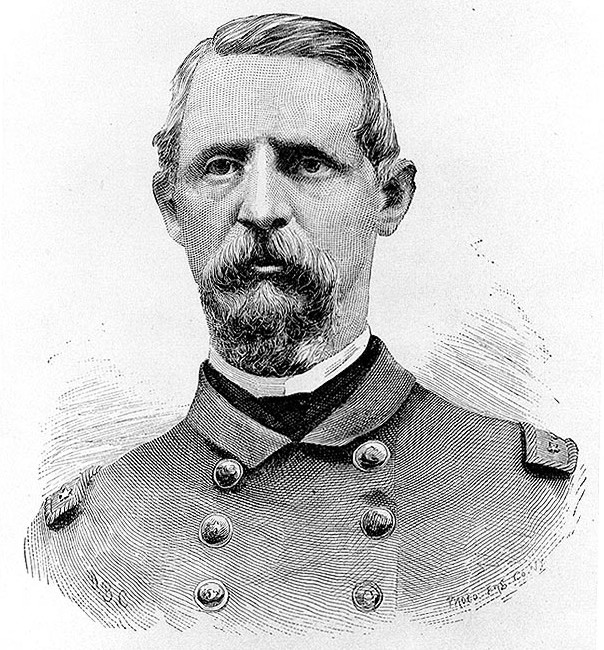
- First Lt. Charles Manigault Morris, CSN
- Born: May 7, 1820; Adams Run, South Carolina, US
- Died: March 22, 1895 (aged 74); Baltimore, Maryland, US
- Spouses: Hannah Heyward Troup (died 1854) Clementina McAllister (m. 1861)
- Children: 4
- Relatives: Gabriel Manigault (grandfather)

Charles Manigault Morris (May 7, 1820 – March 22, 1895) was an officer in the United States Navy and later in the Confederate States Navy. Morris was a descendant of several of the most prominent Northern and Southern families in colonial America.

== Early life ==
Morris was born in Adams Run, South Carolina, on May 7, 1820. He was the youngest son of Col. Lewis Morris (1785–1863) of New York and his wife Elizabeth (née Manigault) Morris (1785–1822) of South Carolina, who married in 1807. Among his siblings was Gabriella Manigault Morris (wife of John Mease Butler and sister-in-law of Pierce Mease Butler), Margaret Ann Morris (wife of John Berkley Grimball), Henry Manigault Morris (who married M. Georgia Edwards), and Richard Lewis Morris (who married Anne Elizabeth Dunwoodie). In 1822, when Charles was just two years old, his mother and older brother Lewis were killed during a hurricane on Sullivan's Island. In 1837, his father remarried to Amarinthia Lowndes, a daughter of James Lowndes and granddaughter of Gov. Rawlins Lowndes. From his father's second marriage, he had three half-siblings, including Lewis Morris (b. 1842), who lived in Paris. Although they lived in the South, his father maintained control of Morris family property around Morrisania in New York.

His paternal grandparents were Maj. and Brevet Lt. Col. of the Continental Army Lewis V. Morris (eldest son of Continental Congressman and signer of the Declaration of Independence Lewis Morris who was the third and last Lord of Morrisania Manor) and Ann B. (née Elliott) Morris (a sister-in-law of U.S. Representative Daniel Huger). His maternal grandparents were architect Gabriel Manigault (a son of Peter Manigault, the wealthiest person in British North America in 1770) and Margaret (née Izard) Manigault (a daughter of Continental Congressman and U.S. Senator from South Carolina Ralph Izard). He was also distant cousin of Confederate General Arthur Middleton Manigault, and a great-nephew of Arthur Middleton.

== Career ==
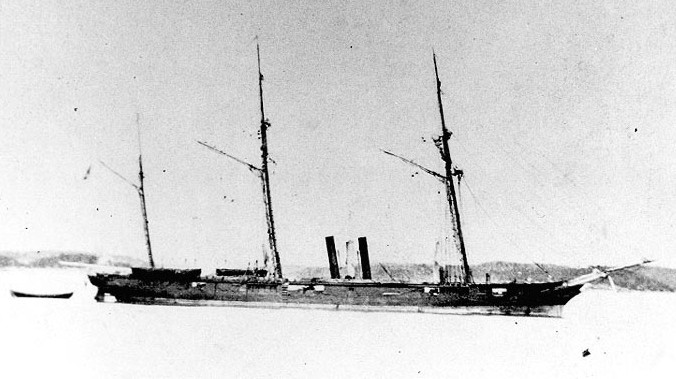
Morris' command, the CSS Florida.

In December 1837, he entered the United States Navy as a midshipman. He was promoted to the rank of Lieutenant in 1851, serving "with honor during the Mexican War." In 1853, he was Lieutenant on the USS Mississippi with Commodore Matthew C. Perry's expedition to Japan. While in Japan, Morris received gifts from Emperor Kōmei. In 1860, he was First Lt. of the USS Marion with the Africa Squadron off the coast of Africa.

He resigned his commission on January 29, 1861, following South Carolina's secession and was ordered to the command of the CSS Huntress, side-wheel steamer, in Savannah. In March, he was appointed a First Lieutenant in the Confederate States Navy. From 1861 to 1863, Morris served on the Savannah, Georgia Station where he married his second wife.

After John Newland Maffitt became ill at Brest, France, Morris took over in January 1864 as commander of the CSS Florida. As commander, he captured Electric Spark, Harriet Stevens, Golconda, Margaret Y. Davis, and USS Mondamin along the coast of the United States. Morris then crossed the ocean to Tenerife in the Canary Islands before cruising back to Brazil capturing the B.X. Hoxie, Cairaissanne, David Lapsey, USS Estella, George Latimer, Southern Rights, Greenland, Windward, William C. Clark, and Zelinda. In October 1864, however, his ship was illegally captured in a Brazilian harbor by the Union Navy. Morris and most of his crew were ashore when his ship was boarded in the middle of the night while at anchor in neutral waters. During the remainder of the American Civil War, he served abroad as an agent of the Confederate States government.

=== Later life ===
Following the war, Morris and his family settled in England. After the War, his wife took an interest in the education of President Jefferson Davis' daughter, Margaret "Maggie" Davis at the convent in France. In 1880, he returned to the United States and lived the rest of his life in Baltimore, Maryland.

== Personal life ==
Morris family portraits by John Wollaston
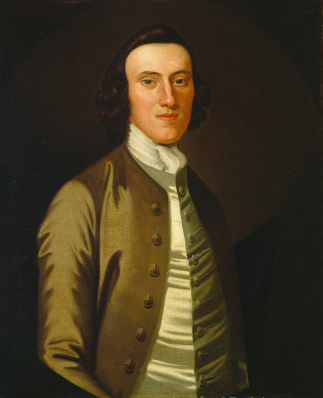
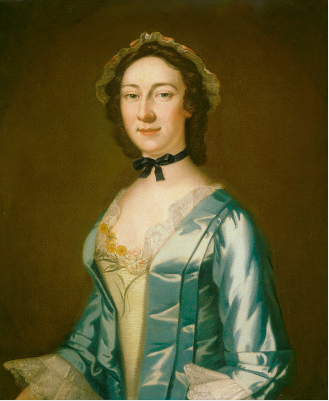
A Gentleman of the Morris Family and Mary Walton Morris, both of which Charles inherited from his elder brother's widow. After his death, they passed to Charles' son Lewis. Today they are both owned by the National Gallery of Art.

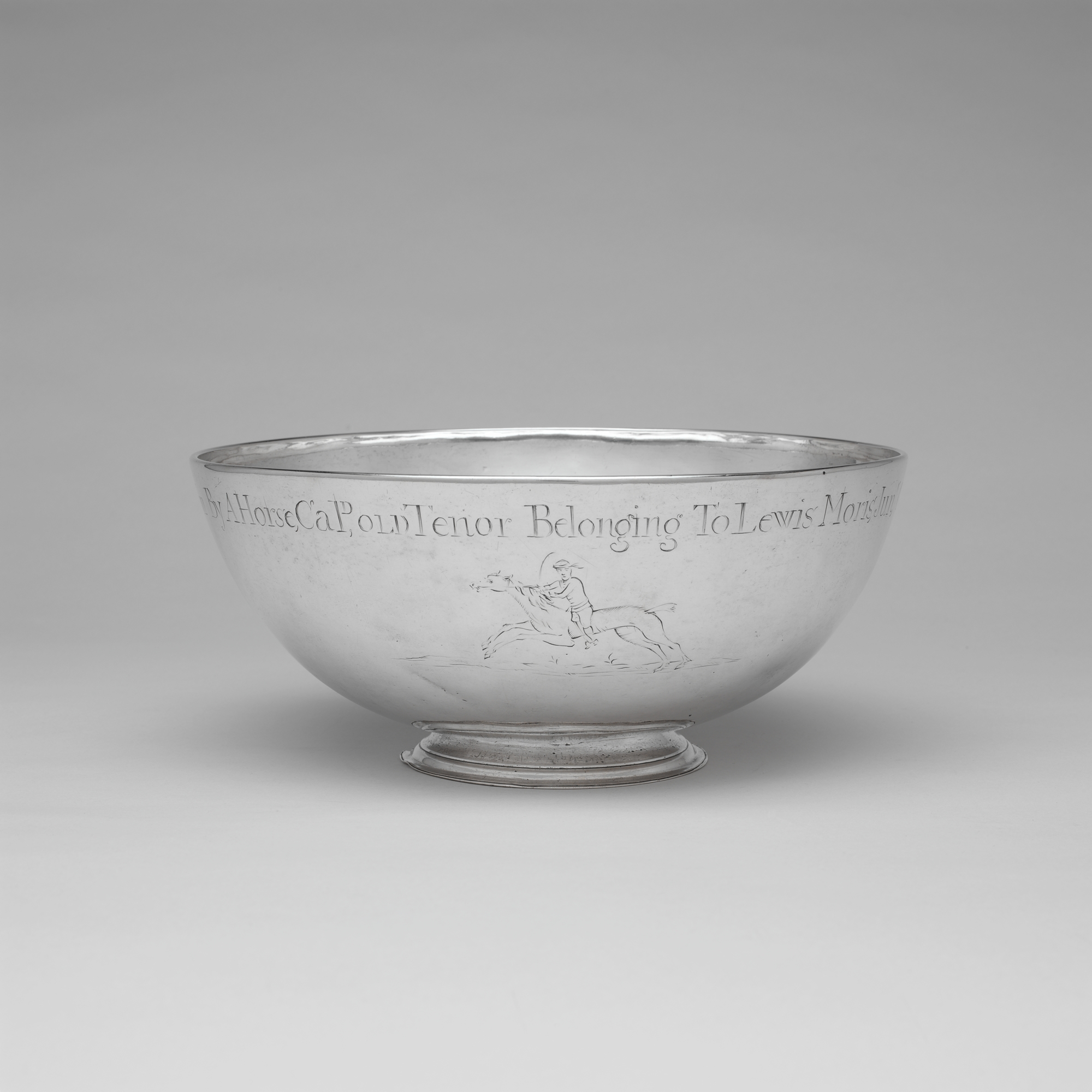
A Morris family punch bowl, c. 1751, donated to the Metropolitan Museum of Art in 1950 by Morris' daughter-in-law.

Morris was twice married. His first wife was Hannah Heyward Troup (1830–1854), a daughter of Camilla Heyward Brailsford and James McGilvary Troup. After her death in 1854, he married Clementina Hansen McAllister (1832–1907), a daughter of George Washington McAllister of Strathy Hall, Georgia (and namesake of Fort McAllister), in November 1861. His second wife was a first cousin of Archibald McAllister, a U.S. Representative from Pennsylvania during the Civil War. Together, they were the parents of:

- Elizabeth Manigault Morris (1863–1910), who never married and died while abroad with her sister.
- Henry Manigault Morris (1865–1884), who was born in Caen, France and died unmarried.
- Lewis Morris (1867–1940), a doctor and Captain in the United States Navy who married Mary Gibbs Murphy, a daughter of Thomas and Mary (née Gibbs) Murphy of New York, in 1906. After his first wife's death, he married Ella Willard (née Bingham) Duffy (c. 1863–1953), a daughter of Jacob Willard Bingham, in 1911.
- Clementina Rosalie Morris (1873–1919), who was born in Brighton, England. She died unmarried in 1919 and left her dog, Tommy Moonface, a legacy of $10 month of the rest of his life for his "board and keep".

Morris died at his home, 908 St. Paul Street in Baltimore, on March 22, 1895. His funeral service, led by the Rev. Dr. John Sebastian Bach Hodges, was held at St. Paul's Episcopal Church in Baltimore. His pall-bearers were Gen. John Gill, Henry Thompson, Capt. Fitzhugh Carter, John Carey, Capt. Yates Stirling, John W. Williams, John I. Middleton and Gen. Joseph Lancaster Brent. After the funeral, his body was sent to New York where was laid to rest in the family vault at St. Ann's Church in Morrisania. His widow died on August 24, 1907.
