= St. James Church (Goose Creek, South Carolina) =

Historic church in South Carolina, United States

- St. James' Church, Goose Creek
- U.S. National Register of Historic Places
- U.S. National Historic Landmark
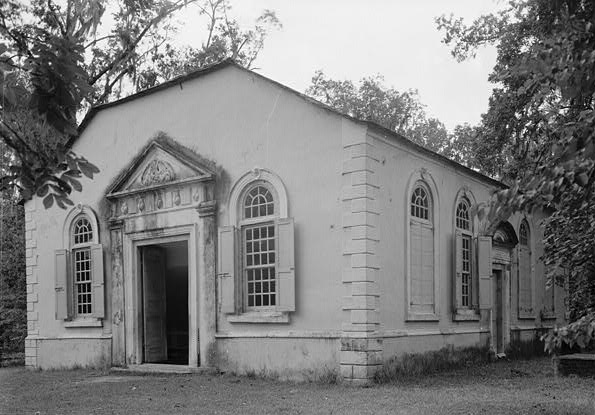
- 1940 HABS photo

- Location within South Carolina Location within the United States
- Nearest city: Goose Creek, South Carolina
- Coordinates: 32°58′31.764″N 80°1′57.6114″W
- Built: 1713–19
- Architectural style: Georgian
- NRHP reference No.: 70000566

Significant dates
- Added to NRHP: April 15, 1970
- Designated NHL: April 15, 1970

St. James' Church, Goose Creek, also known as the Goose Creek Church, is an Episcopal church at 100 Vestry Lane in Goose Creek, South Carolina. Built in the 1710s, it is one of South Carolina's oldest surviving buildings, and one of a small number of surviving early Georgian chapels in the nation. It was declared a National Historic Landmark in 1970.

== Description and history ==
St. James Church is located on a wooded lot on the west side of Snake Road, between the Goose Creek Primary School and Goose Creek Road. It is a single story masonry structure, built out of stuccoed brick and covered with a clipped-gable slate roof. The building corners are quoined, and there is a line of simple brickwork at the eave. There are entrances at the centers of three sides, with flanking round-arch windows. The main entrance is on the west side, with flanking pilasters rising to a decorative frieze and gabled pediment. The interior has three aisles separating rows of 18th-century box pews. The east end of the building has the pulpit, with an original reading stand and sounding board. The wall behind the pulpit carries rich baroque decoration, whose central feature is the seal of George I of Great Britain. Its decorations include cherubs in stucco and a pelican feeding her young.

The Province of Carolina formally established the Church of England in 1706, dividing South Carolina into six parishes. The Saint James parish church was built 1713-19 by English settlers from Barbados, and is one of the oldest Episcopal churches in the United States. The building has seen some modest alterations, and its walls were strengthened with iron tie rods in 1844. The church was damaged by an earthquake in 1886, which collapsed the west gable end.

The original churchyard is now surrounded by a brick wall. Buried in the churchyard is Ralph Izard, a former U.S. senator from South Carolina who served as president pro tempore of the Senate in 1794. Robert Jordan, author of The Wheel of Time series of fantasy novels, also has his ashes buried here. A monument to John Parker (1759–1832) was moved there in 1952 from the nearby Hayes Estate, for preservation.

== See also ==
- List of the oldest buildings in South Carolina
- List of National Historic Landmarks in South Carolina
- National Register of Historic Places listings in Berkeley County, South Carolina
