= CSS Huntress =

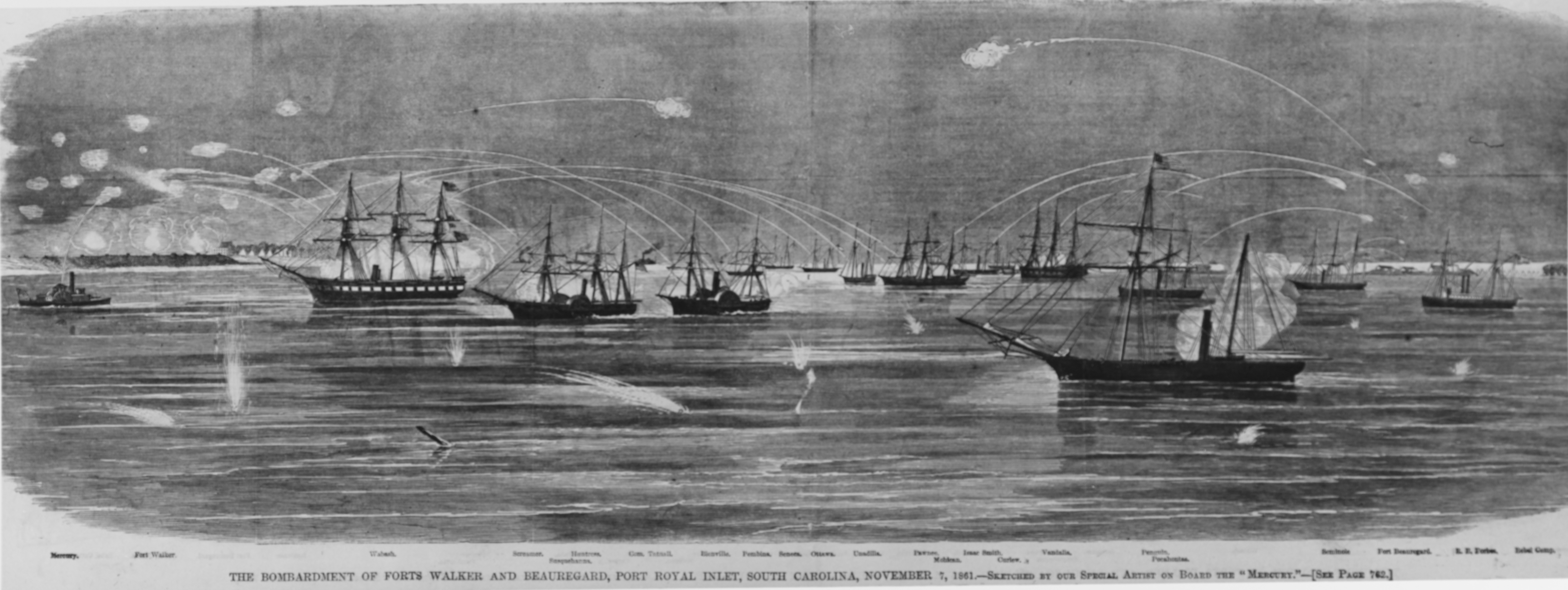

History

Confederate States
- Name: Huntress
- Operator: Confederate States Navy
- Fate: Renamed Tropic and accidentally burned in Charleston.

General characteristics
- Type: Steam side-wheel gunboat
- Armament: 1 to 3 guns.

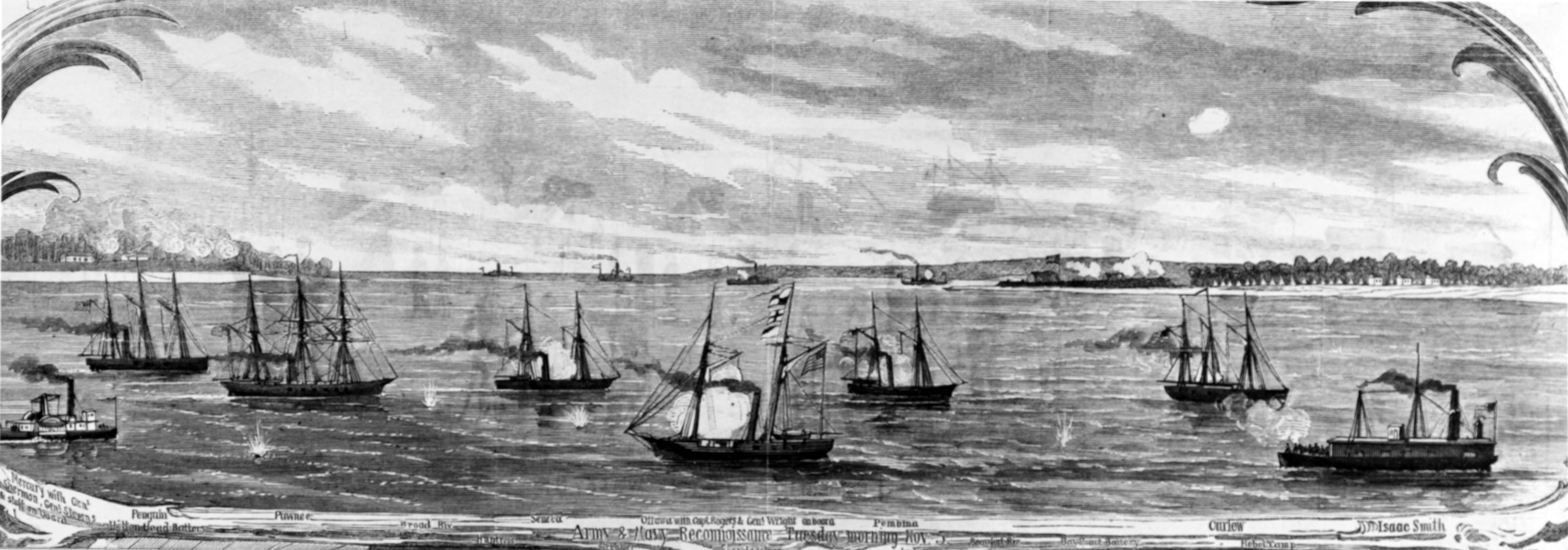
CSS Huntress and CSS Lady Davis in combat with Union transports at Battle of Port Royal.

CSS Huntress was purchased in New York City in March 1861 for the State of Georgia which later relinquished her to the Confederate States Navy. Her first commanding officer was Lt. Wilburn B. Hall, CSN, in that he went North to buy and bring her South; Hall was then detached and reported to Savannah, being succeeded by Lt. C. Manigault Morris, CSN.

Huntress had been a crack Boston-Portland mail packet, "very narrow beam, low in the water, immense side-wheels, painted black"; she had been built at New York City in 1838.

Huntress-first ship to raise the Confederate flag on the high seas, it is claimed-served on the Charleston station during 1861-62, taking part in the battle of Port Royal, S.C., 7 November 1861. During the summer of 1862 she served as a transport in Charleston harbor, taking the duty of Planter (q.v.) which fell into Federal hands. Huntress had been advertised for sale in May but was not sold until 29 October, when she finally went for $133,650 to A. J. White & Son, Charleston merchants. Converting to a blockade runner, she was renamed Tropic.

Attempting to escape to sea with turpentine and cotton on 18 January 1863, she was accidentally burned off Charleston; USS Quaker City rescued passengers and crew.
