= Salon (France) =

Early Modern Revolutionary French salons

The salons of early modern France were social and intellectual gatherings that played an integral role in the cultural development of the country. The salons were seen by contemporary writers as a cultural hub for the upper middle class and aristocracy, responsible for the dissemination of good manners and sociability. Salons became a center of intellectual conversation, as well as a debate stage for social issues, playing host to many members of the Republic of Letters. In contrast to other early modern institutions, women played an important and visible role within the salons. Each woman, or salonnière, played a different role within these salons. Some were actively involved in conversation and debate, while others used their connections to bring others together and spread Enlightenment ideas.

== Historiography ==
The historiography of the salons is far from straightforward. The salons have been studied in depth by a mixture of feminist, Marxist, cultural, social and intellectual historians. Each of these methodologies focuses on different aspects of the salons, and thus there are varying analyses of the salons’ importance in terms of French history and the Enlightenment as a whole.

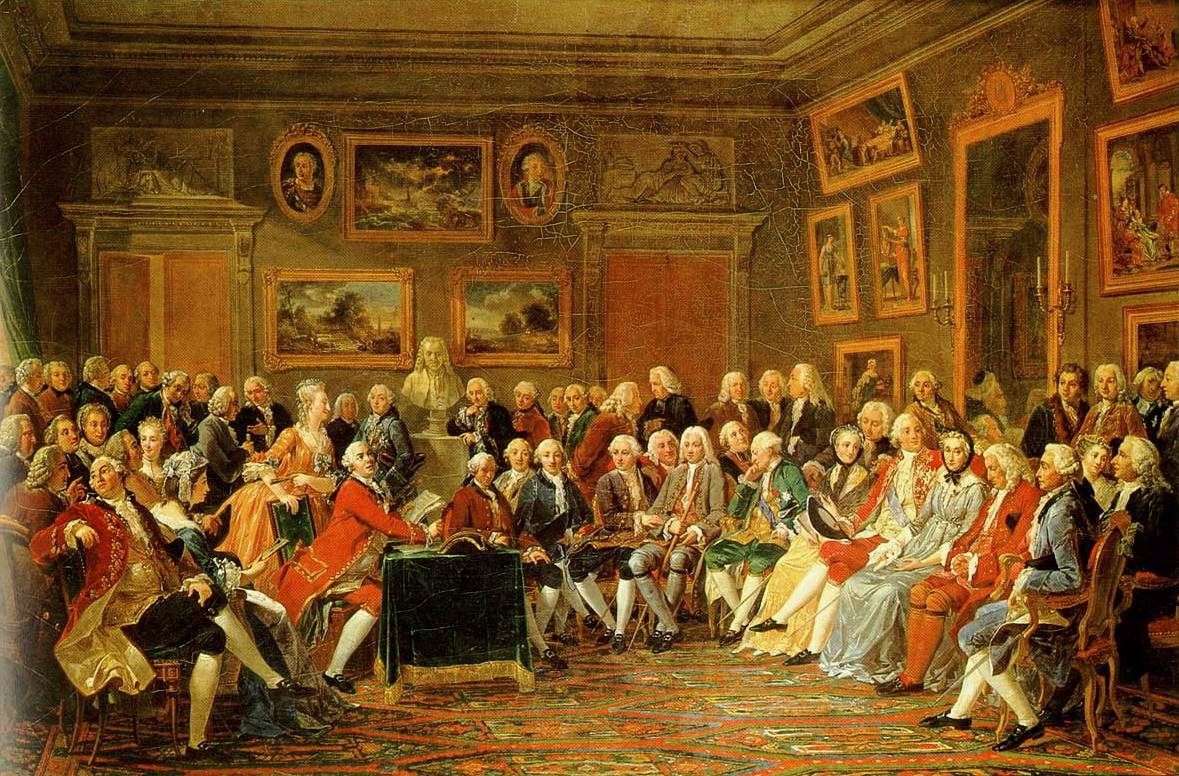
In the Salon of Madame Geoffrin in 1755 by Anicet Charles Gabriel Lemonnier. A reading in the Salon of Marie Thérèse Rodet Geoffrin, 1755

Major historiographical debates focus around the relationship between the salons and the public sphere, as well as the role of women within the salons.

=== Periodization of the salon ===
Breaking down the salons into a historical periods is complicated due to the various historiographical debates that surround them. Most studies stretch from the early sixteenth century up until around the end of eighteenth century. Goodman is typical in ending her study at The French Revolution where, she writes: 'the literary public sphere was transformed into the political public'. Steven Kale is relatively alone in his recent attempts to extend the period of the salon up until Revolution of 1848. Kale points out:

A whole world of social arrangements and attitude supported the existence of french salons: an idle aristocracy, an ambitious middle class, an active intellectual life, the social density of a major urban center, sociable traditions, and a certain aristocratic feminism. This world did not disappear in 1789.

=== “Penny Universities” ===
In the 17th century “penny universities” started to pop up across Western Europe. These “universities” appeared in coffee shops, where they got the name “penny university”. This name came because people could go to these shops, and for a very low cost (the cost of a cup of coffee), one could learn the newest scholarly information, discuss local politics and other news. Anyone of any social class could frequent the coffeehouses, and so they became associated with equality and republicanism; however, in many cities and countries, women were excluded because at this point in time they were widely considered the “weaker” sex, incapable of debating or learning in a male-dominated area. These coffeehouses can be seen as a predecessor to the Salons of the French Revolution in that they provided non-aristocracy with access to knowledge and were a hub for discussion on Enlightenment ideals, political reform, and the arts.

=== Cultural rise of salons ===
In the 1500s with colonialism and mercantilism rising, wealth and luxury items made their way into Europe. This opulence nurtured elitism among those in the upper class and ideas such as “Art for arts sake”.

For decades Court Life was how upper class French men and women communicated, spread new ideas, and created cultural trends. The lower members of the aristocracy would send their daughters to court, where they would learn about the arts and culture, but also make social connections and gain status, with the ultimate goal of making a profitable marriage arrangement. Over time courts became a half open, half closed place, with members of somewhat different status all mingling. Since court culture focused mainly on the arts, women held an almost equal position to men. However, as Enlightenment ideas spread across Europe and in France, monarchies and courtlife fell out of favor with the public. This allowed bourgeois women in the home to create a culture and atmosphere similar to that of Royal life, but with more equality.

=== Conversation, content and the form of the salon ===
The content and form of the salon must be studied in order to understand the character and historical importance of the salon. Contemporary literature about the salons is dominated by idealistic notions of politeness, civility and honesty, but whether the salons lived up to these standards is matter of debate. Older texts on the salons tend to paint an idealistic picture of the salons, where reasoned debate takes precedence and salons are egalitarian spheres of polite conversation. Today, however, this view is rarely considered an adequate analysis of the salon.

The period in which salons were dominant has been labeled the 'age of conversation'. The topics of conversation within the salons - that is, what was and was not 'polite' to talk about - are thus vital when trying to determine the form of the salons. There is no universal agreement among historians as to what was and was not appropriate conversation. Marcel Proust 'insisted that politics was scrupulously avoided'. Others suggested that little other than government was ever discussed. The disagreements that surround the content of discussion partly explain why the salon's relationship with the public sphere is so heavily contested.

=== The salon and the 'public sphere' ===
Recent historiography of the salons has been dominated by Jürgen Habermas' work, The Structural Transformation of the Public Sphere (triggered largely by its translation into French, in 1978, and then English, in 1989), which argued that the salons were of great historical importance. Theatres of conversation and exchange – such as the salons, and the coffeehouses in England – played a critical role in the emergence of what Habermas termed the ‘public sphere’, which emerged in ‘cultural-political contrast’ to court society. Thus, while women retained a dominant role in the historiography of the salons, the salons received increasing amounts of study, much of it in direct response to, or heavily influenced by Habermas’ theory.

The dominance of Habermas’ work in salon historiography has come under criticism from some quarters, with Pekacz singling out Dena Goodman's Republic of Letters for particular criticism because it was written with ‘the explicit intention of supporting [Habermas’] thesis’, rather than verifying it. The theory itself, meanwhile, has been criticized for a fatal misunderstanding of the nature of salons. The main criticism of Habermas’ interpretation of the salons, however, is that the salons were not part of an oppositional public sphere, and were instead an extension of court society.

This criticism stems largely from Norbert Elias’ The History of Manners, Book 1 of The Civilizing Process 1939, in which Elias contends that the dominant concepts of the salons – politesse, civilité and honnête – were ‘used almost as synonyms, by which the courtly people wished to designate, in a broad or narrow sense, the quality of their own behaviour’. Joan Landes agrees, stating that, ‘to some extent, the salon was merely an extension of the institutionalised court’ and that rather than being part of the public sphere, salons were in fact in conflict with it. Erica Harth concurs, pointing to the fact that the state ‘appropriated the informal academy and not the salon’ due to the academies’ ‘tradition of dissent’ – something that lacked in the salon. But Landes’ view of the salons as a whole is independent of both Elias’ and Habermas’ school of thought, insofar that she views the salons as a ‘unique institution’, that cannot be adequately described as part of the public sphere, or court society. Others, such as Steven Kale, compromise by declaring that the public and private spheres overlapped in the salons. Antoine Lilti ascribes to a similar viewpoint, describing the salons as simply ‘institutions within Parisian high society’.

The most prominent defense of salons as part of the public sphere comes from Dena Goodman's The Republic of Letters, which claims that the ‘public sphere was structured by the salon, the press and other institutions of sociability’. Goodman's work is also credited with further emphasizing the importance of the salon in terms of French history, the Republic of Letters and the Enlightenment as a whole, and has dominated the historiography of the salons since its publication in 1994.

=== Women in the salon ===
When dealing with the salons, historians have traditionally focused upon the role of women within them. Works in the nineteenth and much of the twentieth century often focused on the scandals and ‘petty intrigues’ of the salons. Other works from this period focused on the more positive aspects of women in the salon. Indeed, according to Jolanta T. Pekacz, the fact women dominated history of the salons meant that study of the salons was often left to amateurs, while men concentrated on 'more important' (and masculine) areas of the Enlightenment.

A woman who hosted a salon would be known as the hostess, and would be responsible for when the salon would take place, who was invited, the schedule of events, and which philosophes would have their ideas highlighted that evening.

Philosophes, who were integral to the Enlightenment becoming as widespread as it did, relied on Salonnières to give them an audience with people who held political influence to share their ideas. salonnières also played governess roles during political debate between philosophes and more traditional thinkers, often keeping conversation from erupting into argument when there were disagreements.

Historians tended to focus on individual Salonnières, creating almost a 'great-woman' version of history that ran parallel to the Whiggish, male dominated history identified by Herbert Butterfield. Even in 1970, works were still being produced that concentrated only on individual stories, without analysing the effects of the Salonnières' unique position. The integral role that women played within salons, as salonnières, began to receive greater - and more serious - study in latter parts of the twentieth century, with the emergence of a distinctly feminist historiography. The salons, according to Caroyln Lougee, were distinguished by 'the very visible identification of women with salons', and the fact that they played a positive public role in French society. General texts on the Enlightenment, such as Daniel Roche's France in the Enlightenment tend to agree that women were dominant within the salons, but that their influence did not extend far outside of such venues.

It was, however, Goodman's The Republic of Letters that ignited a real debate surrounding the role of women within the salons and – so Goodman contends – the Enlightenment as a whole. According to Goodman: ‘The salonnières were not social climbers but intelligent, self-educated, and educating women who adopted and implemented the values of the Enlightenment Republic of Letters and used them to reshape the salon to their own social intellectual, and educational needs’. While few historians doubt that women played an important, significant role in the salons, Goodman is often criticised for her narrow use of sources. Very recent historiography has tended to moderate Goodman's thesis, arguing that while women did play a significant role in the salons they facilitated - rather than created, as Goodman argues - the ideas and debates generally associated with the Enlightenment.

=== Prominent salonnières ===
Madame du Deffand was an upper class French woman, who held weekly salons in Paris. Known for her intelligence and cynicism, Deffand became friends with Enlightenment writer Voltaire, with whom she kept regular contact with throughout her life. Her salons were some of the most popular in Paris and drew a multitude of Parisian nobles and Enlightenment thinkers; including Charles de Montesquieu, Bernard Bovier de Fontenelle, and Marguerite de Launay, baronne de Staal.

Madame Roland was a salonnière, writer, and revolutionary. Roland moved to Paris in 1791 with her husband Jean-Marie Roland de la Platière, and soon thereafter joined the political group known as the Girondins. Roland ultimately would become a leader of this moderate Republican group. She began holding salons in her home multiple times per week. Rolands Salons were an important meeting place for many politicians of the time and her husband, Jean-Marie, became secretary of the interior in 1792, expanding her political influence. Records say Roland never actively participated in the conversations held during her salons, she instead sat in the corner of the room, doing some other task such as writing or needlework, but listened carefully to the debates happening around her. Her advocacy happened primarily behind closed doors via letters and private conversations. Despite her active participation in the Revolution, Roland was not an advocate for women's political rights like some other salonnières, it is recorded she believed women should have very moderate public and political lives, and held fairly traditional views of modesty.

Sophie de Condorcet, the wife of the Marquis de Condorcet, ran a salon at the Hôtel des Monnaies in Paris, opposite the Louvre. Her salons were attended by several prominent philosophes and, at various times, Anne-Robert Turgot, Thomas Jefferson, the Scottish economist Adam Smith, Olympe de Gouges and Madame de Staël. Unlike Madame Roland, a fellow member of Girondins, Condorcet was a feminist and openly supported equal political and legal rights for women.

=== Opposition ===
Enlightenment ideals sparked the conversation on women's rights, but not all republicans were fans of this.

Jean-Jacques Rousseau, an Enlightenment philosopher highly praised among historians for his pieces on government and inequality and known for his proposal of the ‘Social Contract’, was opposed to Salonnières and the involvement of women in political debate. Rousseau believed women were intellectually inferior to men and would taint any scientific and philosophical discussion.

Antoine-Leonard Thomas was a distinguished member of a French Academy, but opposed women's involvement in the revolution. He agreed with Rousseau, and published Essay on the character, nature of morals and spirit of women where he stated it was engraved in nature that women were inferior to men in most ways.

== Bibliography ==
- Craveri, Benedetta, The Age of Conversation (New York: New York Review Books, 2005)
- Elias, Norbert, (Trans. Edmund Jephcott), The Civilising Process: The History of Manners, Vol. 1 (Oxford: Basil Blackwell, 1978)
- Goodman, Dena, The Republic of Letters: A Cultural History of the French Enlightenment (Ithaca: Cornell University Press, 1994)
- Kale, Steven, French Salons: High Society and Political Sociability from the Old Regime to the Revolution of 1848 (Baltimore: Johns Hopkins University Press, 2006)
- Habermas, Jürgen, (trans. Thomas Burger), The Structural Transformation of the Public Sphere: An Inquiry into a Category of Bourgeois Society (Camb., Mass.: MIT Press, 1989)
- Harth, Erica, Cartesian Women: Versions and Subversions of Rational Discourse in the Old Regime (Ithaca: Cornell University Press, 1992).
- Huddleston, Sisley, Bohemian, Literary and Social Life in Paris: Salons, Cafes, Studios (London: George G. Harrap, 1928)
- Kavanagh, Julia, Women in France during the Enlightenment Century, 2 Vols (New York: G. P. Putnam's Sons, 1893)
- Landes, Joan B., Women and the Public Sphere in the Age of the French Revolution (Ithaca: Cornell University Press, 1988);
- Latour, Anny (Trans. A. A. Dent), Uncrowned Queens: Reines Sans Couronne (London: J. M. Dent, 1970)
- Lougee, Carolyn C., Le Paradis des Femmes: Women, Salons and Social Stratification in Seventeenth Century France (Princeton: Princeton University Press, 1976)
- Lilti, Antoine, ‘Sociabilité et mondanité: Les hommes de lettres dans les salons parisiens au XVIIIe siècle’ French Historical Studies, Vol. 28, No. 3 (Summer 2005), p. 415-445
- Pekacz, Jolanta T., Conservative Tradition In Pre-Revolutionary France: Parisian Salon Women (New York: Peter Lang, 1999)
- Roche, Daniel, (Trans Arthur Goldhammr), France in the Enlightenment, (Cambridge, Mass.: HUP, 1998)
- Tallentyre, S. G., Women of the Salons (New York: G. P. Putnam's Sons, 1926) and
