= Isaac Motte =

American politician

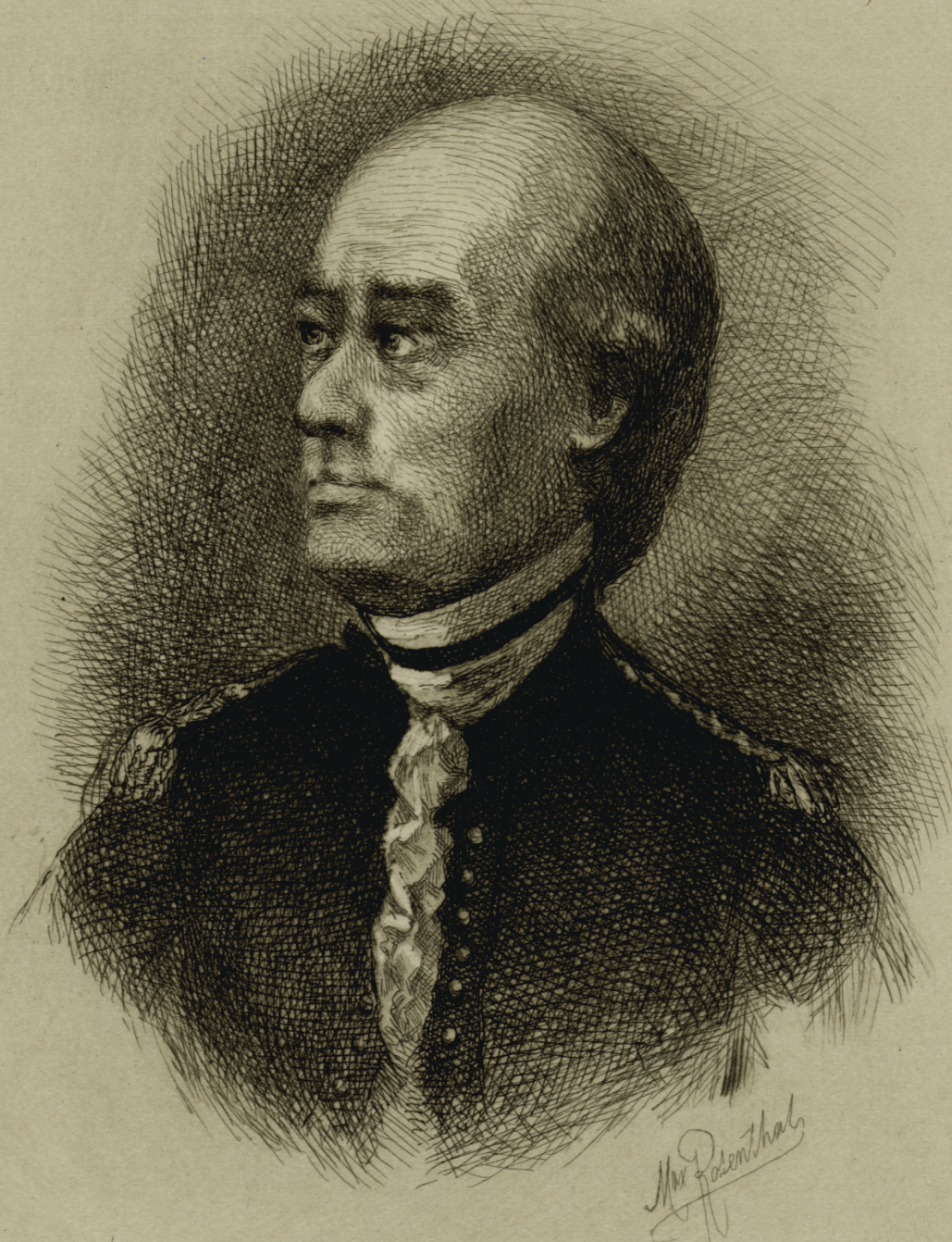
- Etching of Isaac Motte by Max Rosenthal

Member of the Second Continental Congress
- In office 1780–1782

Personal details
- Born: December 8, 1738
- Died: May 8, 1795 (aged 56)

Isaac Motte (December 8, 1738 – May 8, 1795) was an American soldier and statesman from Charleston, South Carolina. He served as a colonel in the Revolutionary War and represented South Carolina in the Continental Congress from 1780 to 1782.
