= USS Izard =

Fletcher-class destroyer

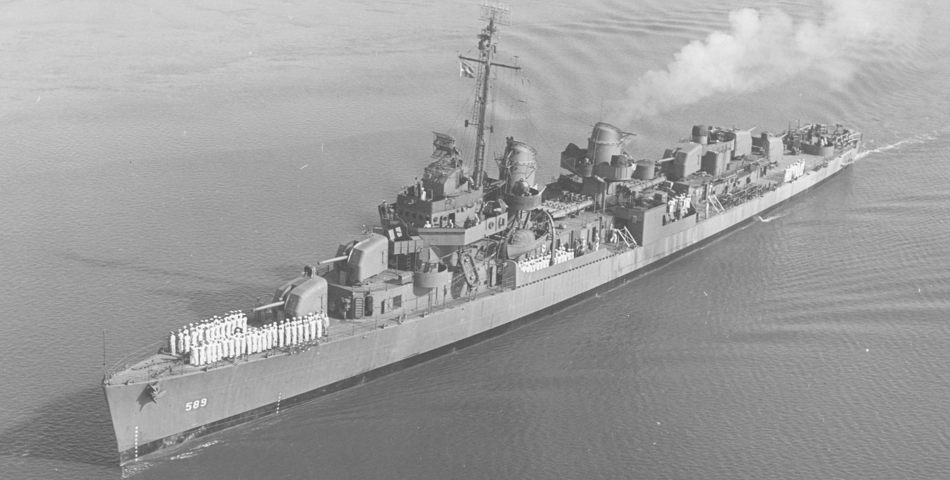
- USS Izard (DD-589) off Charleston SC in 1943

History

United States
- Namesake: Ralph Izard
- Builder: Charleston Navy Yard
- Laid down: 9 May 1942
- Launched: 8 August 1942
- Commissioned: 15 May 1943
- Decommissioned: 31 May 1946
- Stricken: 1 May 1968
- Fate: Sold for scrap, 2 April 1970

General characteristics
- Class & type: Fletcher-class destroyer
- Displacement: 2,050 tons
- Length: 376 ft 6 in (114.7 m)
- Beam: 39 ft 8 in (12.1 m)
- Draft: 17 ft 9 in (5.4 m)
- Propulsion: 60,000 shp (45 MW); 2 propellers
- Speed: 35 knots (65 km/h; 40 mph)
- Range: 6500 nmi. (12,000 km) at 15 kt
- Complement: 273
- Armament: 5 × 5 in (130 mm), 4 × 40 mm AA guns, 4 × 20 mm AA guns, 10 × 21 inch (533 mm) torpedo tubes, 6 × depth charge projectors, 2 × depth charge tracks

USS Izard (DD-589), a Fletcher-class destroyer, was a ship of the United States Navy named for Lieutenant Ralph Izard (1785–1822),

Izard was launched 8 August 1942 by the Charleston Navy Yard; sponsored by Mrs. Robert E. Lee III, great-granddaughter of Lt. Ralph Izard; and commissioned 15 May 1943.

== History ==
After shakedown interrupted by a search for a German U-boat off the coast of The Carolinas, Izard departed Norfolk 14 September 1943 and sailed for Pearl Harbor via the Panama Canal Zone and San Diego. Arriving Pearl Harbor 4 October she spent the next 6 weeks training and standing plane guard duty.

As the Pacific Fleet started its mighty sweep across Micronesia Izard sortied 10 November 1943 from Pearl Harbor with Rear Admiral Charles Alan Pownall's Carrier Force (TF-50) for the Gilbert Islands operations, and for the next month provided air, surface and antisubmarine protection for Makin Island.

After taking part in the bombardment of Nauru Island 8 December 1943 Izard retired to Havannah Harbor, Efate. Here she trained and rehearsed for the fleet's next target—the Marshall Islands. Izard sortied from Funafuti Harbor, Ellice Island, 23 January 1944 with Rear Admiral Forrest Sherman's Carrier Task Group to provide air cover for the assault and capture of Kwajalein. At 04:40 29 January the carriers launched their first strikes toward Kwajalein. By that afternoon the fleet had delivered many devastating blows on the enemy. By 4 February Izard had entered Majuro Atoll, recently captured from the Japanese, and dropped anchor. Here she joined Admiral Raymond Spruance's Truk Striking Force and Admiral Marc Mitscher's Fast Carrier Task Force (TF 58/38) for strikes on Truk (17–18 February 1944). The first strike was launched at 06:42 17 February and after 2 days the carrier planes had destroyed auxiliary cruisers Aikoku Maru and Eiyosumi Maru; destroyer Fumizuki; submarine tenders Rio de Janeiro Maru and Heian Maru; aircraft ferry Fujikawa Maru, 6 tankers and 17 more marus; total tonnage about 200,000. Planes from Enterprise (CV-6) also sunk destroyers Oite and Agano. On the first day of the strikes while Admiral Mitscher's planes were at work, Admiral Spruance's group, including Izard, conducted a round-the-atoll search to catch escaping vessels. They sunk light cruiser Katori, destroyer Maikaze, and sub chaser SC-24. After 18 February Truk lost its usefulness as a fleet anchorage or advanced naval base for the Japanese. In addition, the 250 to 275 planes destroyed or damaged was a severe blow to the Japanese air force.

Izard screened the carriers launching strikes in the Tinian-Saipan area 22 February, retiring to Majuro the 26th and Pearl in mid-March. From March through August she operated in support of the 5th Fleet operations in New Guinea and the Marianas. Izard was part of the screen for Admiral J.J. "Jocko" Clark's Carrier Task Group TG 58.1 during the Battle of the Philippine Sea (19–20 June 1944) which broke the enemy's once-mighty naval air arm.

Izard continued in support of fast carriers launching strike after strike against the enemy. On 4 July 1944 it was in a group of three cruisers and four destroyers that bombarded the airfield at Iwo Jima. During the first part of October she joined Admiral John S. McCain's task group for strikes on Okinawa and Formosa. During the following months she supported the Leyte operation and participated in the Battle of Lingayen Gulf. There she was next to the Columbia (CL-56) when the Columbia was hit by a kamikaze. At one point, she sailed through the eyewall of a Pacific storm that had 50 knot winds. In February 1945 she was supposed to head for refitting, but another ship needed replacement as part of the Iwo Jima attack. She sailed with one other ship to Iwo Jima, arrived on the second day of the invasion, and was assigned duty during the Battle of Iwo Jima rendering fire support, screening, and radar picket duty until 27 March. She fired 3,600 five inch rounds at Iwo Jima during the battle, firing from South of the island.

Izard steamed for Eniwetok 28 March arriving 2 April. Joining a convoy she steamed east, reaching Pearl Harbor on the day of FDR's death, hearing the news as she was sailing in the channel at Pearl on her arrival. She then quickly resumed sailing and arrived at Bremerton for refitting on 20 April 1945. Izard sailed for Pearl Harbor 30 June and in August joined the Northern Pacific Force at Adak, Alaska. The last of August, the Izard sailed for Honshū, Japan, and after the war continued to operate in northern Japan, liberating prisoners-of-war and demobilizing Japanese army and navy units until 15 November.

Izard returned to Seattle the last of November and 2 April 1946 steamed to San Diego. Izard decommissioned there 31 May 1946 and joined the Reserve Fleet. She was stricken from the Naval Vessel Register 1 May 1968, was sold 2 April 1970 and broken up for scrap.

== Awards ==
Izard received 10 battle stars for World War II service.
