= Colonel Charles Pinckney =

American politician (1732–1782)

Charles Pinckney

Member of the South Carolina General Assembly
- In office 1754–1772
- Constituency: Christ Church Parish (1754-1760); St. Philip's Parish (1760-1761); St. Michael's Parish (1761-1768); St. Philip's Parish (1768-1772)

Personal details
- Born: March 7, 1732 Charles Town, Province of South Carolina, British America
- Died: September 22, 1782 (aged 50) Mount Pleasant, South Carolina, U.S.

Charles Pinckney (March 7, 1732 - September 22, 1782), also known as Colonel Charles Pinckney, was a South Carolina lawyer and planter based in Charleston, South Carolina. Commissioned as a colonel for the Charles Towne Militia in the colonial era, he was widely known as "Colonel Pinckney". He had a rice and indigo plantation known as Snee Farm along the Wando River, about nine miles from Charleston, and a townhouse on Queen Street in the city.

Captured by the British in 1780 in the fall of Charleston, Pinckney was among more than 160 men who signed loyalty oaths to protect their properties, which the British would otherwise have confiscated and possibly destroyed. After the war, to penalize his Loyalist oath, the state legislature assessed a fine against Pinckney based on the value of his property.

His son and namesake Charles Pinckney inherited the plantation and slaves and became a prominent politician after the American Revolution. After participating in the constitutional convention, he was elected to three non-consecutive terms as governor of the state, and as a US Senator and US Representative.

== Early life ==
Pinckney was born to William Pinckney and Ruth Brewton in 1732 in Charleston. He was educated and grew up in a planter family. His grandfather, Thomas Pinckney, immigrated to Yorktown from Shropshire in 1698, at the age of 17, and worked as a baker's assistant. His father served as Master of Chancery. William had joined his older brother, Charles Pinckney, in setting up "the first fire insurance company in America, the Friendly Society."

It was profitable, but an extensive fire in 1740 in Charleston resulted in high damages, and William suffered financially. He sent his son to be cared and educated by his wealthier brother Charles. The younger Charles Pinckney studied law, passing the bar in 1752.

== Career and death ==
Pinckney became a leading attorney in the city of Charleston. He bought his first plantation, now known as Snee Farm, in 1754, as a mark of his early success. The 715-acre plantation was used to produce the commodity crops of rice and indigo.

He also became a public figure, serving as colonel and commanding officer of the Charles Towne Militia, after which he became widely known as "Colonel Pinckney". He was elected as a member of the General Assembly, the lower house of provincial government in South Carolina. In 1775, he was elected as president of the South Carolina Provincial Congress.

During the American Revolutionary War, Colonel Pinckney was among many persons captured by the British during the fall of Charleston in 1780. South Carolina Governor John Rutledge had left the city, intending to carry on a state government in exile in North Carolina. Colonel Pinckney was among more than 160 men in Charleston who took a loyalty oath to the British in order to keep their properties; the British hoped these influential men would help them lead the city.

Pinckney's action as a Loyalist was extremely unpopular among the revolutionary forces. After the war, in February 1782, the South Carolina legislature voted a 12% amercement, or fine, against Colonel Pinckney's property to punish him for his switch of allegiance.

On his death in 1782, Pinckney left the Snee Farm plantation and its slaves to Charles, his oldest surviving son. There were 40 slaves recorded in the probate record. Colonel Charles Pinckney was buried at St. Philip's Church in Charleston.

== Personal life ==
Pinckney married his first cousin, Frances Brewton (b. June 11, 1733). She was a daughter of his uncle Robert Brewton, a goldsmith who was associated with banking and financial circles in the city, and Mary Loughton, a widow.

Frances's siblings included an older brother Miles Brewton (1731-1775) (named after his paternal grandfather) and younger sister Rebecca Brewton (1737-1815) (named after her paternal aunt). Before the Revolutionary War, Miles had become wealthy, based largely on his success as a slave trader and merchant in Charleston. Their sister Rebecca married Jacob Motte, also a planter, who had a townhouse in Charleston. After Miles and all his family were lost at sea in August 1775 on their way to Philadelphia, where he was to serve as a delegate to the Second Continental Congress, Frances and her sister Rebecca jointly inherited Miles's mansion in Charleston, which is now known as Miles Brewton House.

The Pinckneys had several children, Charles (his namesake), Thomas (named after Pinckney's paternal grandfather), Miles Brewton (named after Frances's brother), Mary, and Rebecca Pinckney.

== Legacy ==
In 1782, the younger Charles Pinckney inherited Snee Farm, the rice and indigo plantation, and its numerous enslaved African Americans at his father's death. A monument originally intended for his father's grave was moved to Snee Farm because his age was carved incorrectly. The younger Pinckney became a leading politician after the Revolutionary War. He served in numerous offices, including being elected as Governor of South Carolina to three non-consecutive terms.

== See also ==
- Miles Brewton House
