= De Lancey family =

Colonial American and British family

de Lancey family
- Arms: Or, an eagle wings displayed, sable, charged on the breast with a shield azure, three tilting lances, or, in pale, points upward
- Parent family: de Lancy
- Current region: England, United States, Canada
- Origin: France
- Connected families: Schuyler, Van Cortlandt

The de Lancey family was a distinguished colonial American and British political and military family.

== History ==
Of French origin, the de Lancey family was a Huguenot cadet branch of the House of Lancy, recognized in 1697 as part of the noblesse d'ancienne extraction (nobility of old extraction), as its noble status had been proven since the 15th century. The earliest known head of the house, Guy de Lancy, was the first viscount of Laval and of Nouvion, and held those fiefs in 1432. His great-great-grandson, Charles II, the fifth viscount, had three sons, including his second son, Jacques, who converted to Protestantism.

The grandson of Jacques de Lancy, Étienne, fled to London following the revocation of the Edict of Nantes in 1685, where he obtained denization on March 11, 1686, after taking an oath of allegiance to James II and becoming a British subject. He then sailed for New York, arriving on June 7, 1686, and obtaining denization on July 7. Anglicizing his name to "Stephen de Lancey," he married into the influential Van Cortlandt family and became a prominent merchant and member of the provincial assembly. His eldest surviving son, James (1703–1760), became successively Chief Justice of New York and Lieutenant-Governor of the province.

The De Lanceys remained one of the most prominent and politically influential families in the Province of New York until the American Revolution, when they sided with the Loyalists and raised units of Loyalist troops. Consequently, following the end of the conflict in 1783, their estates were confiscated and the family exiled to Britain and Canada. The branch of the family descended from Oliver de Lancey (1718–1785), youngest son of Stephen Delancey, emigrated to Britain, several of its members becoming distinguished officers in the British Army. While most of the family permanently left the United States following the Revolution, John Peter (1753–1828), the son of James De Lancey, resigned his commission in the British Army and returned to New York in 1789, having missed his homeland. His son, William H. DeLancey (1797–1865), served as the Provost (chief administrator) of the University of Pennsylvania and subsequently became the first Episcopal bishop of the Diocese of Western New York.

== Family tree ==
The following genealogical tree illustrates the links among the more notable family members:

- Stephen De Lancey (1663–1741), m. 1700: Anne Van Cortlandt (1676–1742)
  - James (1703–1760), m. 1729: Anne Heathcote (1703–1778)
    - James Jr. (1732–1800), m. 1771: Margaret Allen
      - Charles Stephen (d. 1840)
      - James III (d. 1857)
    - Stephen II (d. 1795)
    - John Peter (1753–1828), m. 1785: Elizabeth Floyd (1759–1819)
      - Thomas James (1789–1822), m. Mary Ellison (1798–1842)
        - Thomas James II (1817–1859)
      - Susan Augusta (1792–1852), m. 1811: James Fenimore Cooper (1789–1851)
      - Edward Floyd (1795–1820)
      - William Heathcote (1797–1865), m. 1820: Frances Munro (1797–1869)
        - Edward Floyd (1821–1905), m. 1848: Josephine Matilda De Zeng (1823–1865)
          - Edward Etienne (1859–1927), m. 1890: Lucia Cleveland Grannis (1872–1939)
            - Edwin Floyd (1893–1982)
            - William Heathcote III (1897–1961)
        - William Heathcote II (1837–1924)
  - Peter (1705–1770), m. 1737: Elizabeth Alice Colden (1721–1785)
    - Stephen (1738–1809)
    - John (1741–1830)
    - Peter (d. 1771)
    - James (1746–1804), m. 1784: Martha Tippett (1760–1837)
      - William (1783–1869)
      - Peter (1802–1882)
    - Oliver (1750–1820)
    - Warren (1761–1846)
  - Susannah (1707–1771), m. 1731: Vice-Admiral Peter Warren (1703–1752)
  - Oliver (1718–1785), m. 1742: Phila Franks (1722–1811)
    - Stephen (1748–1798), m. Cornelia Barclay
      - William Howe (1778–1815), m. 1815: Magdalene Hall (1793–1822)
    - Oliver (1749–1822)
      - Oliver III (1803–1837)
  - Anne (1723–1775), m. 1742: John Watts
