= Hall baronets of Dunglass (1687) =

The Hall baronetcy, of Dunglass in the County of Haddington was created in the Baronetage of Nova Scotia on 8 October 1687 for John Hall of Dunglass, Lord Provost of Edinburgh and from 1689 Member of the Scottish Parliament for Edinburgh.

The 4th Baronet was a politician, geologist and geophysicist. The 10th Baronet was Director of the Food Section at the Ministry of Munitions during the First World War and subsequently Chief Reconstruction Officer for Scotland at the Ministry of Labour. The 14th Baronet was Governor of British Somaliland.

== Hall baronets, of Dunglass (1687) ==
- Sir John Hall, 1st Baronet (died 1695), twice Lord Provost of Edinburgh
- Sir James Hall, 2nd Baronet (died 1742). Hall married (as his 2nd wife) Margaret Pringle, daughter of Sir John Pringle, 2nd Bart of Stichill. They had issue.
- Sir John Hall, 3rd Baronet (died 1776)
- Sir James Hall, 4th Baronet (1761–1832)
- Sir John Hall, 5th Baronet FRS (1787–1860)
- Sir James Hall, 6th Baronet (1824–1876)
- Sir Basil Francis Hall, 7th Baronet (1832–1909)
- Sir Henry John Hall, 8th Baronet (1835–1913)
- Sir John Richard Hall, 9th Baronet (1865–1928)
- Sir Martin Julian Hall, 10th Baronet (1874–1958)
- Sir Julian Henry Hall, 11th Baronet (1907–1974)
- Sir Lionel Reid Hall, 12th Baronet (1898–1975)
- Sir Neville Reynolds Hall, 13th Baronet (1900–1978)
- Sir Douglas Basil Hall, 14th Baronet (1909–2004)
- Sir John Douglas Hoste Hall, 15th Baronet (1945–2025)
- Sir Thomas James Hall, 16th Baronet (born 1975)

The heir presumptive is the present holder's younger brother Bernard Neville Hall (born 1979).
