= Hampole Priory =

Priory in Hampole, England

Coordinates: 53°35′16.8″N 1°14′14.0″W

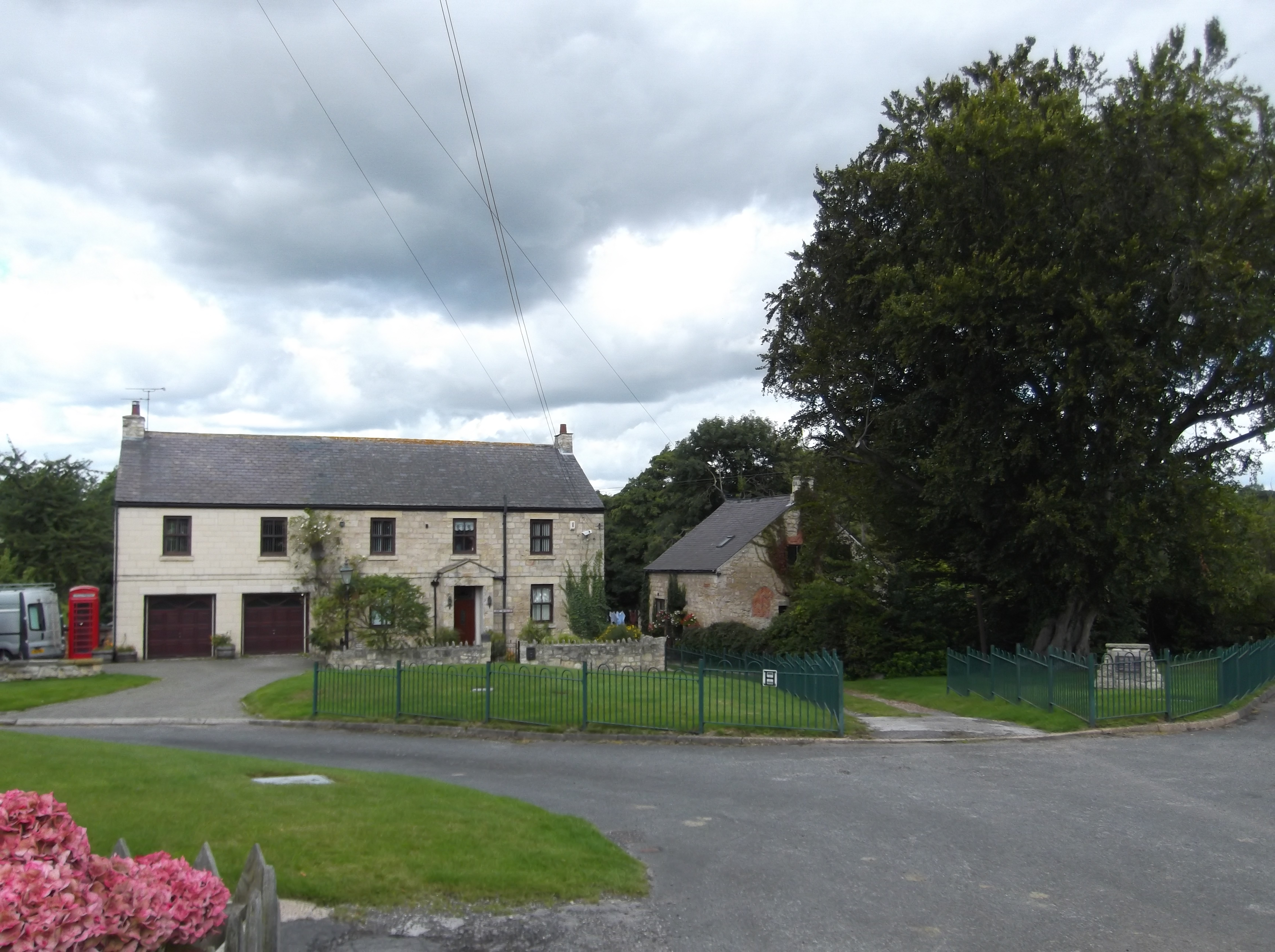
Abbey Cottage on the site of the former Hampole Priory

Hampole Priory was a priory of Cistercian nuns (Knowles & Hadcock) in Hampole, South Yorkshire, England. Its existence was documented in a papal bull of 1146. The nuns were active in the wool trade. Richard Rolle, a mystic author in the 14th century known as the "hermit of Hampole", settled at the priory after several moves and lived there until his death in 1349. It was dissolved in the 16th century.

In 1552, Edward VI granted the nunnery to Francis Aislaby, a soldier who had served in Scotland at the siege of Haddington and was captain of Dunglass Castle. A cottage now stands on the site of the former priory.
