= John Hall of Dunglass =

Scottish merchant

Sir John Hall of Dunglass, 1st Baronet (1650–1695) was a 17th-century Scottish merchant who twice served as Lord Provost of Edinburgh: from 1689 to 1691 and 1692 to 1694.

== Life ==
He was born around 1650 the son of James Hall of Dunglass and his wife, Janet Higgins.

In October 1687 he was many of the several Scottish gentry granted a baronetcy in Nova Scotia, under the title of Baronet of Dunglass. This baronetcy was somewhat meaningless as Nova Scotia was at that time under French control. The purpose was largely a money-making exercise rather than a meaningful area for colonisation. The baronetcies had to be bought.

In 1689 he succeeded Magnus Prince as Lord Provost of Edinburgh. He served a second term from 1692 to 1694 then was succeeded by Robert Chieslie of Dalry.

He died in November or December 1695, a few weeks after his second marriage. He is buried in Greyfriars Kirkyard in Edinburgh.

== Family ==
He married Catherine Loch daughter of James Loch of Drylaw. She was widow of James Mein of Craigcrook. They had one son, Sir James Hall, 2nd baronet (1673-1742).

Following Catherine's death he married Margaret Fleming, daughter of George Fleming of Kilconquhar, on 18 October 1695.

His descendants included Sir John Hall, 3rd Baronet and Sir James Hall, 4th Baronet.

See also Hall baronets
