= Stephen Delancey (colonial administrator) =

Chief Justice of the Bahamas and Governor of Tobago

Stephen de Lancey (1748 in New York City – 6 December 1798 in Portsmouth, New Hampshire) was Chief Justice of the Bahamas and Governor of Tobago.

== Early life ==
De Lancey was the son of Major-General Oliver De Lancey, Sr. and Phila Franks, whose Ashkenazi Jewish parents had emigrated from London in the early eighteenth century. His paternal grandfather was Etienne de Lancey, also known as Stephen Delancey, and his brother was Oliver deLancey, a British Army officer.

== Career ==
De Lancey was a lawyer who served as the Clerk of the city and county of Albany, New York in 1765. He was also a Lieutenant-colonel of the 1st New Jersey loyal volunteers in 1782. In 1786, he was a member of the Nova Scotia Council and served as Chief Justice of the Bahamas from 1790 to 1797. From 1797 until his death in 1798, he was the Governor of Tobago.

== Personal life ==
Stephen de Lancey was married to Cornelia Barclay. She was the daughter of the Rev. Henry Barclay, Rector of Trinity Church, New York. Together, they were the parents of two children:

- William Howe De Lancey, an officer in the British Army during the Napoleonic Wars who married Magdalene Hall, one of the three daughters of Sir James Hall of Dunglass, 4th baronet, and his wife Lady Helen Douglas, a daughter of Dunbar Douglas, 4th Earl of Selkirk
- Susan De Lancey, who first married Colonel William Johnson. After his death, she married Hudson Lowe, a soldier who served as Governor of St Helena, where he was the "gaoler" of Napoléon.

Delancey died on 6 December 1798 in Portsmouth, New Hampshire while serving as Governor of Tobago.
