= George Home of Kello =

Lord Provost of Edinburgh from 1698 to 1700

Sir George Home of Kello was Lord Provost of Edinburgh from 1698 to 1700. He then became principal tax collector for the Scottish Borders. He was later accused of not passing the taxes to the government in 1707, the year of the abolition of the Scottish parliament.

== Life ==
George Home was the son of John Home of Kello (in Berwickshire) and his wife Susanna Maxwell. He appears to be a descendent of George Home the king's main tax collector at the time of the Union of Crowns in 1606.

He was a merchant in Edinburgh, and joined the council as first a burgess then a baillie. In 1698 he succeeded Sir Archibald Muir as Lord Provost of Edinburgh. In his role as Provost he appears to then have become embroiled in the main Scottish money-making venture of the day (which centred on Edinburgh investors), the Company of Scotland and their ill-advised scheme to colonise the Isthmus of Darien in Panama, now known to history as the Darien Scheme.

In 1700 he was succeeded in his role as Lord Provost by Sir Patrick Johnston. He then appears to have become a tax collector.

In 1710 a "Bill of Information" was passed against Home asking him to give a full account of his transactions as tax-collector prior to the Act of Union 1707. This implied he had collected taxes for the Scottish parliament but in the transfer to England and abolition of the Scottish Parliament had failed to pass the collected taxes to either Scotland or England during the period 1706/7.

== Family ==
His daughter Margaret Home married Patrick Lindsay-Crawford, 2nd Viscount Garnock.
