= Francis Aislabie =

16th-century English soldier and politician

Francis Aislabie or Aslaby or Aslackby (by 1515 – 1557), of South Dalton, Yorkshire, was an English soldier and politician.

== Biography ==
He was the first son of James Aislabie by Jane, daughter of Sir John Gower of Stittenham. He was married twice, by 1536 to Maud, daughter of Ralph Gray of Barton, and had with her 4 sons and 4 daughters. His second wife was Joan. He was the Forester of Galtres, Yorkshire, from November 1545 to his death. He was Justice of the Peace in Yorkshire (East Riding) in 1554.

He was a relative of Sir Ralph Ellerker and his name, as "Aislabie", was mentioned for the first time. He served under Ellerker as lieutenant of the light horse at Boulogne where, during December 1545, "where his bravery in the field earned him a commendation from the Earl of Surrey to the King."

Aislabie served in the war with Scotland known as the Rough Wooing. In June 1548 he attacked Dalkeith and burned villages in the Musselburgh area, and he fought off a French landing party at North Berwick. At the recommendation of Thomas Holcroft, he was the marshal of Haddington by September 1549. He was one of the commanders of a raiding party that approached Tantallon Castle and came under artillery fire. They subsequently and burned several villages. He was made captain of the fort at Dunglass by December 1549 – 1550. Edward VI granted him the former cistercian priory of Hampole in 1552.

Aislabie was a Member of Parliament for Scarborough in 1555.
