= James De Lancey =

American politician

Governor of the Province of New York
- In office 1753–1755
- Monarch: George II
- Preceded by: Sir Danvers Osborn, 3rd Baronet
- Succeeded by: Charles Hardy

Governor of the Province of New York
- In office 1758–1760
- Monarch: George II
- Preceded by: Charles Hardy
- Succeeded by: Cadwallader Colden

Personal details
- Born: November 27, 1703 New York City, British America
- Died: July 30, 1760 (aged 56) New York City, British America
- Education: Corpus Christi College; Inner Temple
- Profession: Governor

James De Lancey (November 27, 1703 – July 30, 1760) was an American politician from the colonial period who served as chief justice, lieutenant governor, and acting colonial governor of the Province of New York.

== Early life and education ==
Coat of Arms of James de Lancy

De Lancey was born in New York City on November 27, 1703, the first son of Étienne de Lancy and Anne, a daughter of Stephanus Van Cortlandt.

James went to England for his schooling, and to Corpus Christi College, Cambridge, where he was tutored by future Archbishop of Canterbury Thomas Herring, before studying law at the Inner Temple, London. Having been admitted to the bar in 1725, he returned to New York to practice law and enter politics.

== Career ==
Also in 1729, De Lancey was made a member of the New York Assembly, and in 1731 was appointed as second justice of the Supreme Court of New York. In 1730, De Lancey was chosen to lead a commission to frame a new charter for the City of New York. Passed into law in 1732 by the New York Assembly, "the Montgomerie Charter," was principally the work of James De Lancey, who, for his services, was presented with the Freedom of the City Medal. Also in 1730, De Lancey was appointed to the Governor's Council.

=== Cosby v. Van Dam, 1733 ===
When Royal Governor of New York and New Jersey John Montgomerie died in July 1731, Council President Rip Van Dam was elected acting governor in New York, and Lewis Morris, President of the New Jersey Provincial Council took over the duties temporarily in New Jersey. William Cosby was appointed Captain General & Governor on January 13, 1732, and arrived in New York thirteen months later. Cosby demanded that Van Dam turn over the salary he had received as interim Acting Governor. Confident that Justices Frederick Philipse and De Lancey, who together constituted a majority of the Supreme Court of Judicature, would rule in his favor, he brought suit as a bill in equity in order to avoid a jury trial. Lewis Morris had served as Chief Justice of New York since 1715. Although Cosby won the case, Lewis wrote a minority dissent, which was printed for public distribution. Cosby retaliated by removing Morris from office. (The Lords of the Board of Trade in London later ruled that Morris's removal had been illegal.)

=== Crown v. John Peter Zenger, 1735 ===
In 1733, on the removal of chief justice Lewis Morris, De Lancey was appointed in his stead, and served as chief justice of New York for the remainder of his life.

When two grand juries failed to return an indictment for seditious libel against journalist John Peter Zenger, the Attorney General filed an information and Justices Philipse and De Lancey issued a bench warrant. In response to a writ of habeas corpus, De Lancey set bail far beyond Zenger's means, and Zenger was committed to await trial. Zenger was represented by James Alexander, a former attorney general of the colony, and William Smith, both of whom had written anonymous articles for Zenger's paper that were critical of the Cosby. Both challenged the make up of the court by arguing that Chief Justice Morris' summary removal was illegal and therefore so was De Lancey's appointment to replace him. The court then struck their names from the list of attorneys admitted to practice before the Supreme Court of Judicature.

The court appointed the relatively-inexperienced John Chambers, who nonetheless successfully challenged the list of jurors to ensure a non-biased panel. Meanwhile, supporters of Zenger contacted noted the lawyer Andrew Hamilton, who volunteered to take the case pro bono. As Hamilton was from Philadelphia, he was outside the reach of influence of the New York judges. De Lancey instructed the jury that it needed only to decide if Zenger printed the articles, which appeared clearly libelous. Hamilton argued his case directly to the jury which shortly returned a verdict of not guilty in an early instance of jury nullification in the United States. The Zenger trial is recognized as a landmark colonial case that eventually led to the establishment of a free press in America.

In 1744, one year into George Clinton's position as Governor of New York, De Lancey was granted a commission as New York's chief justice and became a dominant political force, with many relying on his support for their continued time in office and salary. In the same year, he was elected a member of the American Philosophical Society.

=== Lieutenant governor ===
In 1746 a dispute arose between Governor Clinton and the New York Assembly regarding the governor's salary. Chief Justice De Lancey supported the legislature's position in the controversy and thus incurred the enmity of Governor Clinton, who subsequently refused to acknowledge a commission from King George II (dated October 27, 1747) which appointed De Lancey as Lieutenant Governor of New York. Clinton withheld De Lancey's commission as lieutenant governor until October 1753.

With the advent of the French and Indian War, Lieutenant Governor De Lancey convened and presided over a congress of colonial delegates held in Albany, New York, in June 1754 (Albany Congress), for the purpose of establishing an alliance with the Indians for the common defense against the French.

In October 1754, Lieutenant Governor De Lancey granted a charter for the creation of King's College (now Columbia University). In July 1755, Lt. Gov. De Lancey attended a council of governors of the colonies, held at Alexandria, Virginia, to coordinate defense matters with General Braddock against the French.

In September 1755, Sir Charles Hardy arrived from London, assumed the functions of Governor of New York, and thus returned Lieutenant Governor De Lancey to his role as Chief Justice. Hardy's tenure as governor came to an end in July 1757, when Hardy took command of a military expedition to Louisbourg, Nova Scotia, and once again left De Lancey the de facto ruler of the province, which he remained until his death.

== Family ==
In 1729, James De Lancey married Anne Heathcote, daughter of Caleb Heathcote, a former mayor of New York City, at Trinity Church. Their children:

- Captain James De Lancey (1732–1800), who took over the family dry goods business and was active in New York provincial politics.
- Anna De Lancey, who married Thomas Jones (historian).
- Susannah De Lancey, who died unmarried but raised Susannah Burritt, the daughter of the Rev. Blackleach Burritt and Martha Welles.

His brother, Oliver De Lancey, became a senior Loyalist officer in the American War of Independence, joining General Howe on Staten Island in 1776, and raising and equipping De Lancey's Brigade, three battalions of 1,500 Loyalist volunteers from New York State. His sister Susannah Delancey became the wife of Admiral Sir Peter Warren, and another sister, Anne DeLancey, became the wife of John Watts, member of the New York General Assembly.

De Lancey died on July 30, 1760, in New York City.

== Legacy ==
Delancey Street, on New York City's Lower East Side, was named in his honor.

Government offices
Preceded by Sir Danvers Osborn	Governor of the Province of New York (acting); 1753 — 1755	Succeeded by Sir Charles Hardy
Preceded by Sir Charles Hardy	Governor of the Province New York (acting); 1758 — 1760	Succeeded by Cadwallader Colden (acting)
