= Caleb Heathcote =

American mayor (1665–1721)

The Honourable Caleb Heathcote
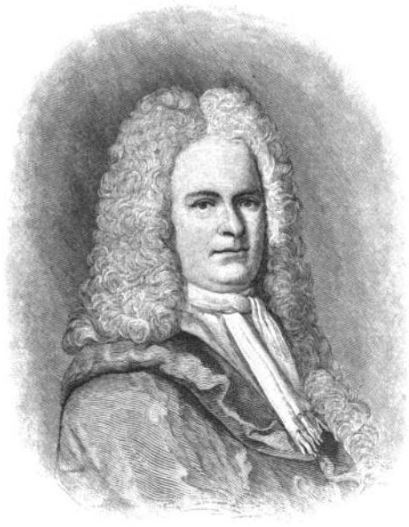

32nd Mayor of New York City
- In office 1711–1713
- Governor: Robert Hunter
- Preceded by: Jacobus Van Cortlandt
- Succeeded by: John Johnstone

Personal details
- Born: March 6, 1665 Chesterfield, Derbyshire, England
- Died: February 28, 1721 (aged 55) New York City, British America
- Spouse: Martha Smith
- Relations: Sir Gilbert Heathcote, 1st Baronet (brother); Sir William Heathcote, 1st Baronet (nephew); James De Lancey (grandson)
- Children: 6

Caleb Heathcote (March 6, 1665 – February 28, 1721) served as the 32nd Mayor of New York City from 1711 to 1713.

== Early life ==
Coat of Arms of Caleb Heathcote

Heathcote was born on March 6, 1665, in his father's house in Chesterfield in Derbyshire, England. Caleb was the sixth son of nine children of the former Ann Chase Dickens and Gilbert Heathcote (d. 1690). He is related to the Heathcote baronets through two brothers: his eldest brother was Sir Gilbert Heathcote, 1st Baronet of London; another brother, Samuel, was the father of Sir William Heathcote, 1st Baronet of Hursley.

== Career ==
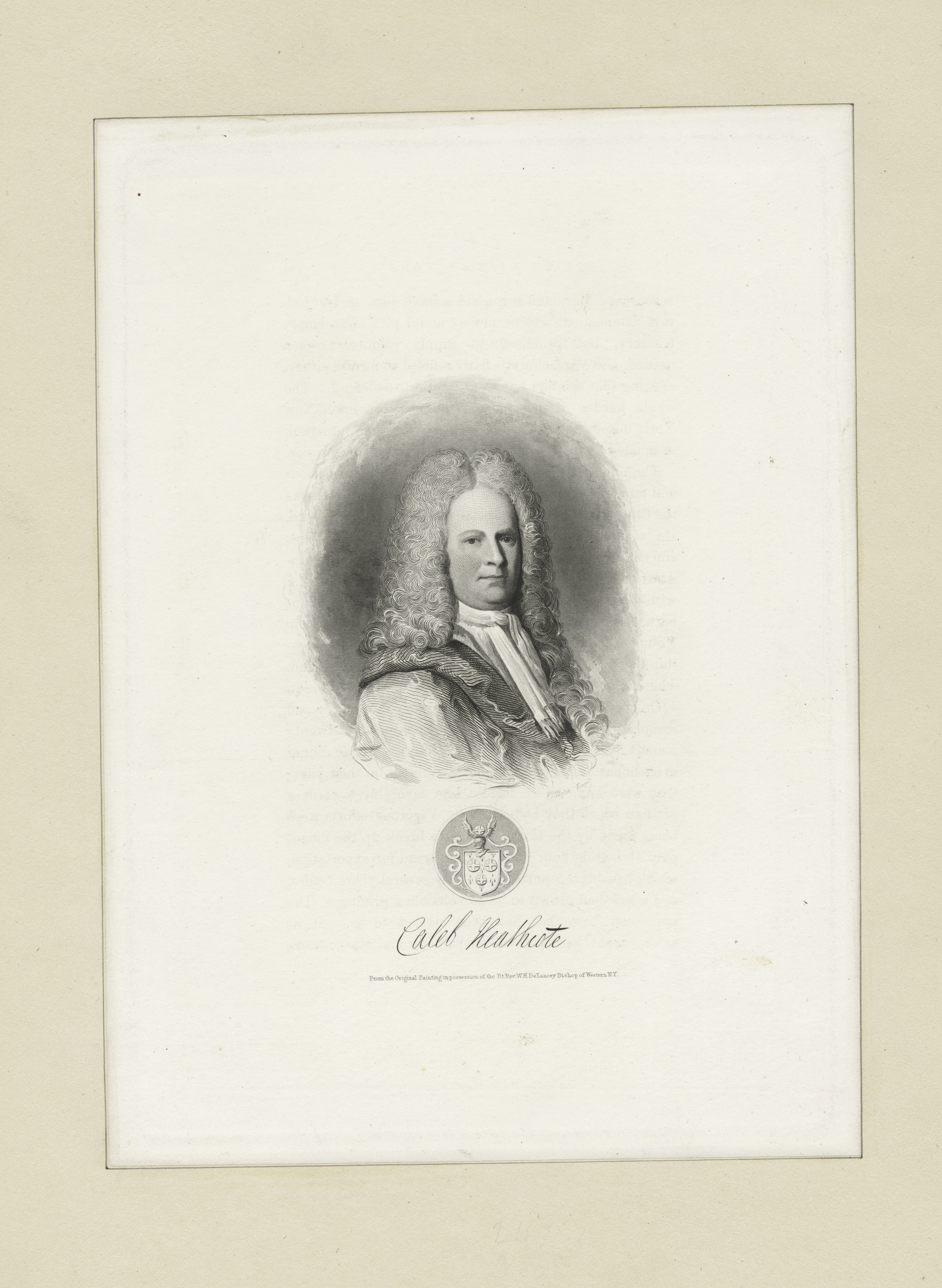

In 1691, Heathcote traveled to America from England. He became a property owner quickly and in 1696, he created the borough town of Westchester. In 1697, he purchased the rights to Mamaroneck and Scarsdale from Ann Richbell and, in 1701, he was "instrumental in having erected the Manor of Scarsdale."

From 1711 to 1713, while his elder brother Gilbert was serving as Lord Mayor of London, Heathcote served as the 31st mayor of New York City under Governor Robert Hunter during the reign of Queen Anne. During the reign of George I, Heathcote served as Surveyor General of His Majesty's Customs for the Eastern District of North America. He also served as judge of the Court of Admiralty for the Provinces of New York, New Jersey and Connecticut and one of His Majesty's Council for the Province of New York.

His estate in Westchester County, New York, is the site of the present-day town of Scarsdale (named after Sutton Scarsdale, his ancestral home in Derbyshire) and was granted on March 21, 1701, or 1702 by Lieutenant Governor of New York John Nanfan.

=== Nine Partners Patent ===
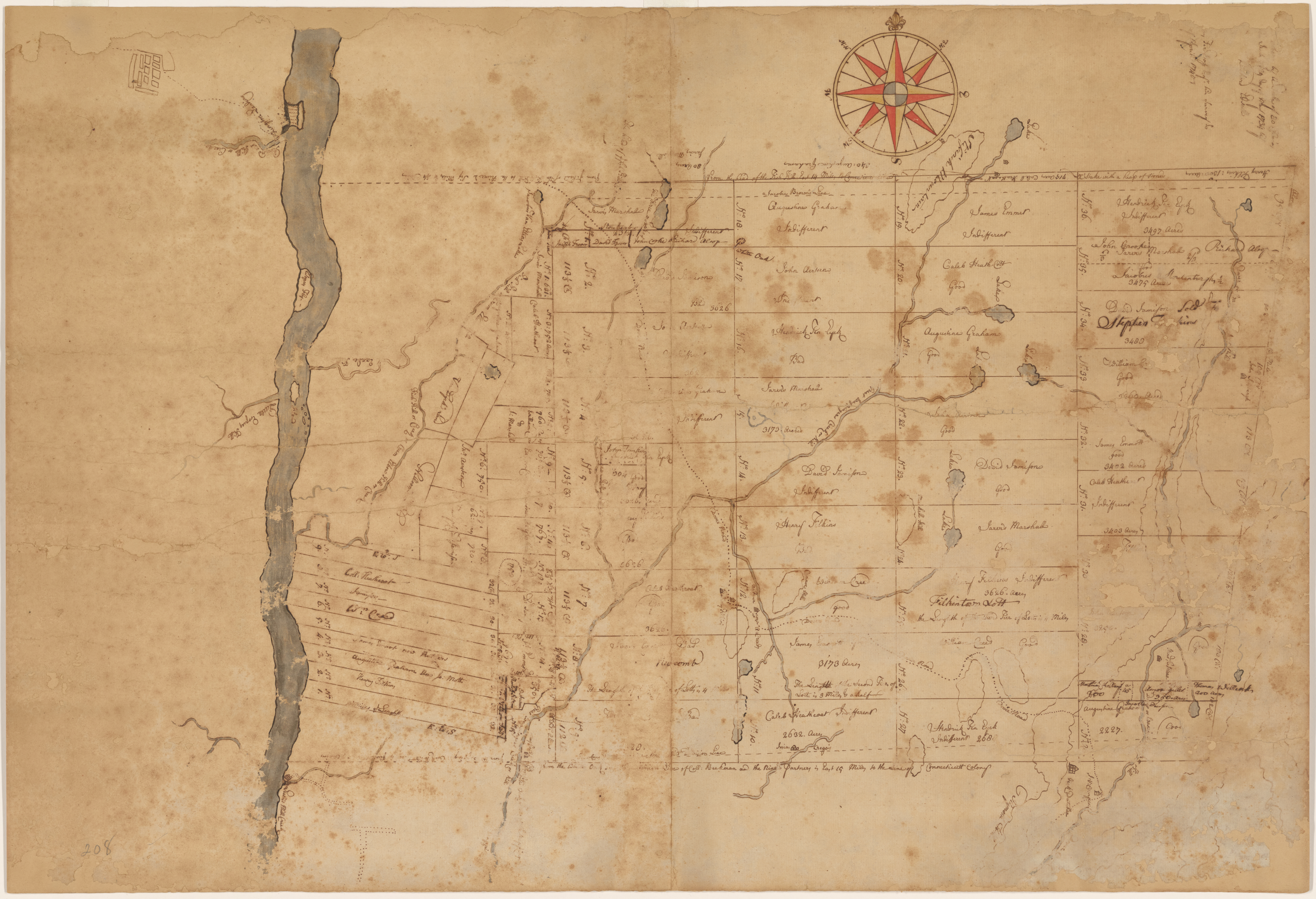
Great Nine Partners Patent

On May 27, 1697, Heathcote as one of nine partners in a land grant in Dutchess County in New York by Governor Benjamin Fletcher known as the Great Nine Partners Patent.

The parcel included about four miles (6 km) along the Hudson River and was believed to be eight to ten miles (13 to 16 km) wide, extending in theory to the Connecticut border.

== Personal life ==
Caleb married Martha Smith, daughter of William "Tangier" Smith, Chief Justice of New York. Together, Martha and Caleb had six children, three of which died young (William, Mary and Elizabeth). Their surviving children included:

- Gilbert Heatcote, who died aged twenty of smallpox while in England completing his education.
- Anne Heathcote (1706–1778), who married James DeLancey (1703–1760), a son of Stephen Delancey and Anne Van Cortlandt (daughter of Stephanus Van Cortlandt), in 1729.
- Martha Heathcote, who married Lewis Johnston, son of John Johnstone of Perth Amboy, New Jersey, and brother of Andrew Johnston (who married Catharine Van Cortlandt).

Heathcote died suddenly of apoplexy in New York City on February 28, 1721. He was buried in the churchyard of Trinity Church in Manhattan, which he was instrumental in founding. As both of his sons and three of his daughters predeceased him, his entire estate, real and personal, was inherited by his two surviving daughters. His widow died on August 18, 1736, and was buried alongside him and three of their children at Trinity.

=== Descendants ===
Through his youngest surviving daughter, he was a grandfather of Margaret Johnston and Anne Johnston, who married William Burnet, only son of Gov. William Burnet and a grandson of George Stanhope, Dean of Canterbury. Margaret Johnston was married to Bowes Reed, the Secretary of State of New Jersey.

== Legacy ==
A neighborhood and an elementary school in present-day Scarsdale, New York are named after Heathcote. A marble statue of him stands atop the Surrogate's Courthouse (former Hall of Records) at 31 Chambers Street in Manhattan. A street in the Bronx is named after him.

== See also ==
- Heathcote (surname)
