= Sir Archibald Muir =

Scottish merchant

Sir Archibald Muir or Mure of Thornton (c.1640–1701) was a Scottish merchant who served as Lord Provost of Edinburgh from 1696 to 1698.

== Life ==
He was born at Thornton near Kilmarnock a descendant of the Mures of Park and Auchindrain, a branch of the Mure of Rowallan tree. His distant cousins included Sir Robert Mure of Caldwell was one of the jury in 1580 at the trial of Lord Ruthven for the murder of David Rizzio. Ruthven was beheaded for his part.

In 1696 he succeeded Robert Chieslie as Lord Provost. He was succeeded in turn by George Home of Kello in 1698.

On 3rd April 1696, Muir was elected to the court of directors of the Company of Scotland trading to Africa and the Indies. He was a member of the Court interest and was voted off the court of the company in March 1700 after it became closely aligned with the opposition.

He was knighted by King William in 1698.

He died in 1701.

== Family ==
He was the cousin of Robert Mure who married Barbara Preston (sister of George Preston), widow of Robert, Lord Sempill.

His daughter Margaret Muir married John Cuninghame of Caddel. The Cuninghames of Caddel inherited the Thornton estate through this marriage, so it is deduced Archibald Muir had no surviving sons.
