= Robert Chieslie =

Scottish merchant

Sir Robert Chieslie of Dalry (sometimes spelled Cheislie, Chiesley or Chishley) (c. 1650 – c. 1705) was a Scottish merchant who served as Lord Provost of Edinburgh from 1694 to 1696.

Given the rarity of the name he is probably Robert Cheislay listed as MP for Edinburgh within the Scottish Parliament from 1692 to 1702.

== Life ==
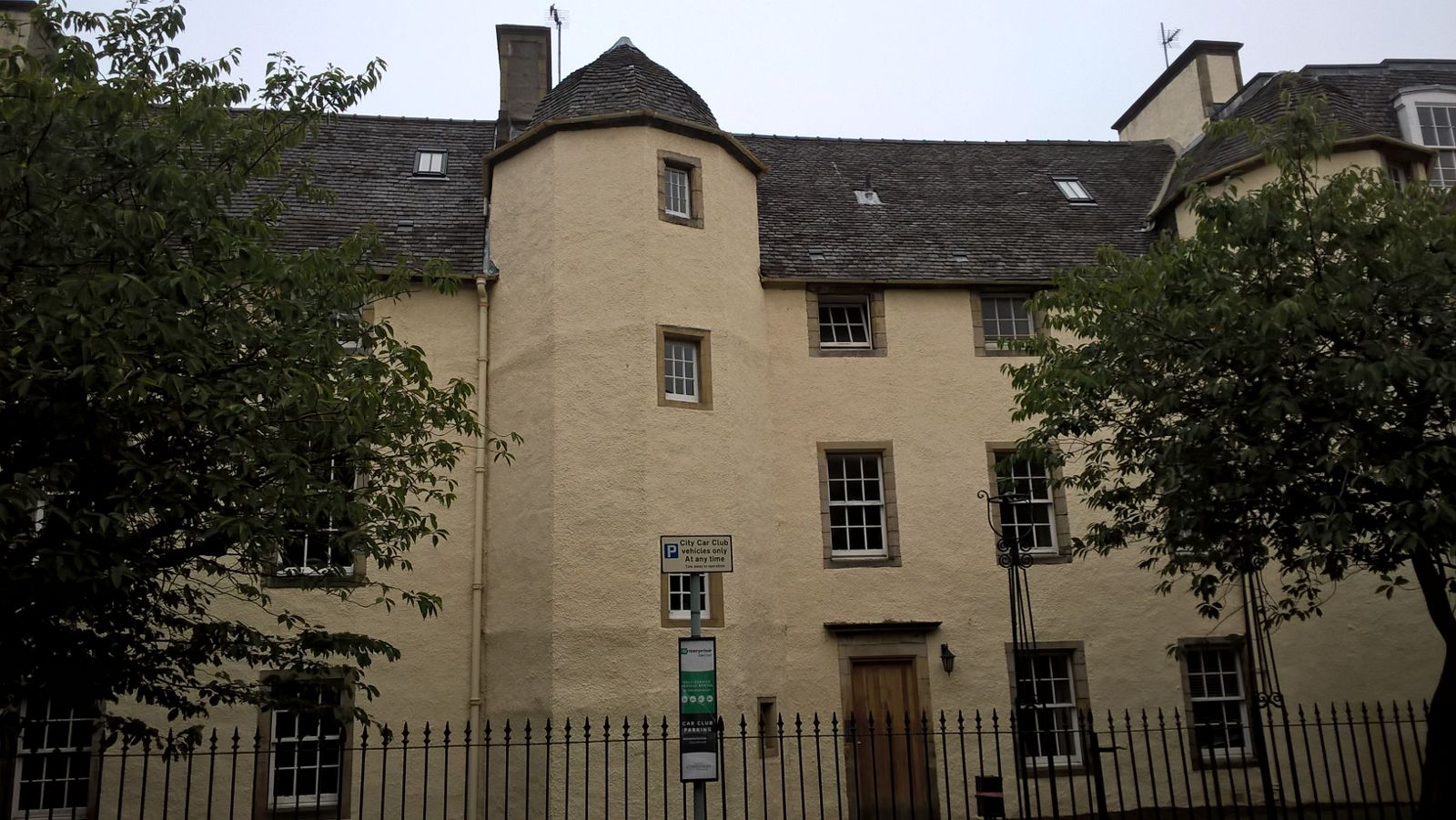
Dalry House, Edinburgh

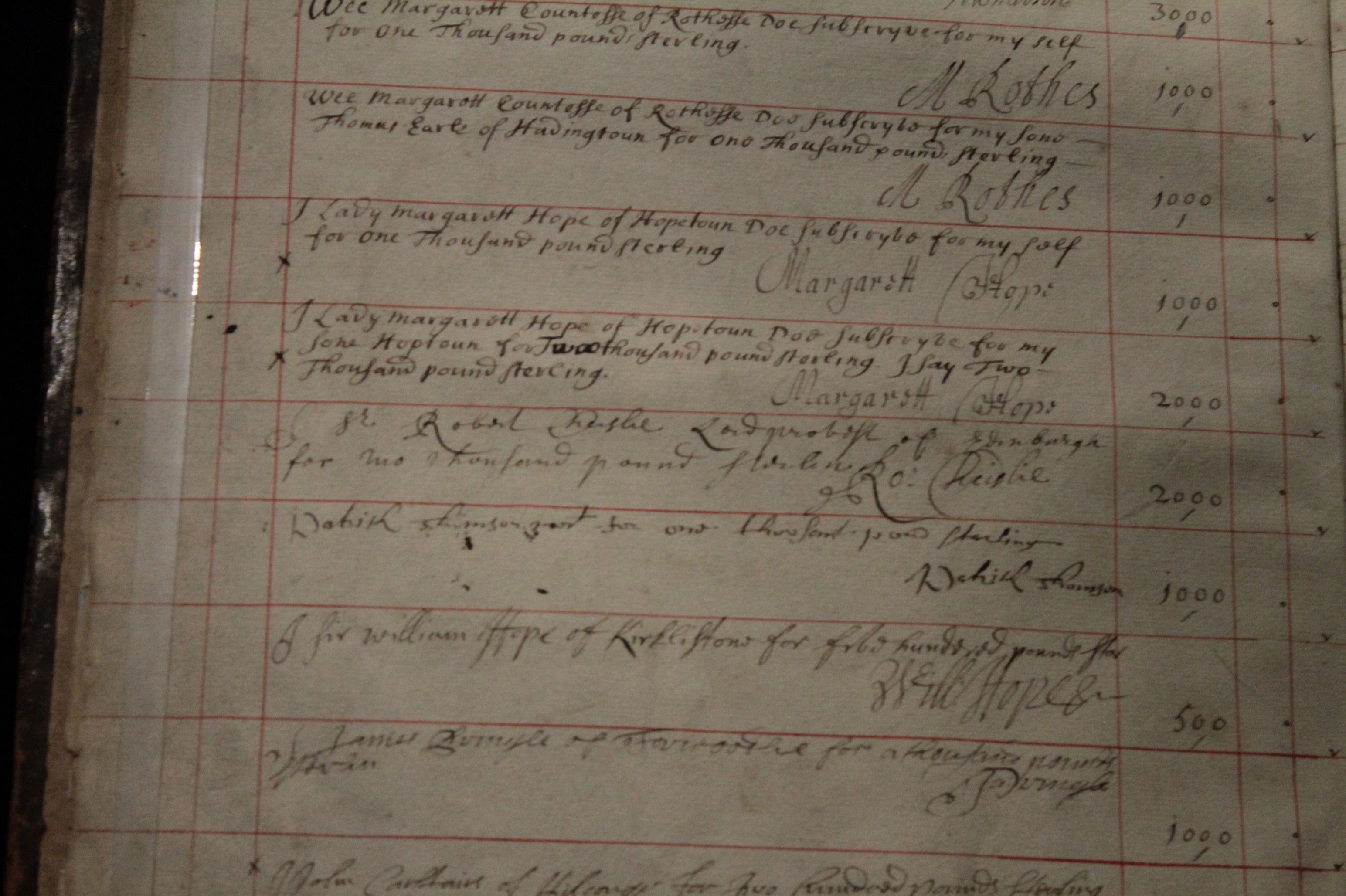
Robert Chieslie's name in the records of the Company of Scotland, giving 2000 Scots pounds to the Darien venture

He was the son of Walter Chieslie of Dalry, a wealthy Edinburgh burgess and his wife, Katherine Tod (d.1679), daughter of Sir Archibald Tod, twice Provost of Edinburgh in the mid 17th century.

In 1661 his father built Dalry House, around a mile west of the city (now enveloped by the city and standing on Orwell Place). Contemporary plasterwork in the house shows allegiance to King Charles II. In 1675 Walter ran paper mills in Dalry on the banks of the Water of Leith.

In 1694 Robert succeeded Sir John Hall of Dunglass as Lord Provost of Edinburgh. He was succeeded in turn in 1696 by Sir Archibald Muir.

Although usually titled "Chieslie of Dalry" a 1695 Act of Parliament names him as "Chiesley of Bonnington", apparently referring to Bonnington House near Ratho. The document, setting up the "Company of Scotland Trading to Africa and the Indies", lists Robert and his brother James Chiesley (a merchant in London) together with around 30 other stockholders, in creating the company, which was involved in the slave trade. Other signatories include Adam Cockburn, Lord Ormiston.

These investors were all bankrupted by the Darien scheme. Chieslie is thought to be one of the handful who lost his mind due to the huge loss. The Edinburgh Bedlam was nicknamed "Darien House" from 1700 as it is said to have had at least two occupants linked to the scheme. As Robert Chieslie disappears from all records after 1698 but is not recorded as dead he fits the bill as one of the inmates leading to the legend. This also links to a history of mental health issues in his family (see below).

He died in the early 18th century and is buried in Greyfriars Kirkyard in the tomb of his mother, Lady Chieslie.

Had he lived until the Union of 1707 he would have been richly compensated for the Darien loss.

== Family ==
He was brother to John Chieslie or Chiesley, who murdered George Lockhart, Lord Carnwath by shooting him in the back in 1689, Chieslie being unhappy regarding a legal judgement he gave awarding his wife a large sum of money.

His niece, John's daughter, was Rachel Chiesley, Lady Grange, wife of James Erskine, Lord Grange and an outlandish figure in her own right. As his nearest relative, she would have received the agreed compensation "owed" to the Company of Scotland in 1707 as agreed in the Act of Union 1707.

His brother James Chiesley moved to London and traded there as a merchant. He was one of the "English" signatories to the Company of Scotland in 1685 (all but two of the signatories were Scots by birth).

He appears to be grandfather or great uncle of Rev John Chieslie, minister of Corstorphine from 1768 to 1789.
