= Basil Hall (Royal Navy officer, born 1788) =

British naval officer (1788–1844)

Captain Basil Hall FRS
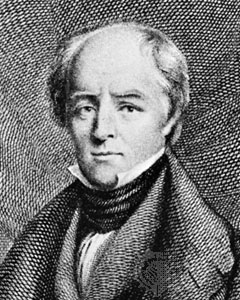
- Born: 31 December 1788; Edinburgh, Scotland
- Died: 11 September 1844 (aged 55); Royal Hospital Haslar, Portsmouth, England
- Military career
- Branch: Royal Navy
- Service years: 1802–1823
- Rank: Captain

Basil Hall FRS (31 December 1788 – 11 September 1844) was a British naval officer from Scotland, a traveller, and an author. He was the second son of Sir James Hall, 4th Baronet, an eminent man of science.

== Early life ==
Although his family home was at Dunglass, Haddingtonshire (now East Lothian), Basil Hall was born in George Square, Edinburgh, at his aunt's house. He was educated at the Royal High School and joined the Royal Navy in 1802, being commissioned a Lieutenant in 1808, and later rising to the rank of captain.

Hall served aboard many vessels involved in exploration and scientific and diplomatic missions. From the beginning of his naval career he had been encouraged by his father to keep a journal, which later became the source for a series of books and publications describing his travels.

== Service in the Napoleonic Wars ==
While serving aboard HMS Endymion, Hall witnessed Sir John Moore being carried dying from the Battle of Corunna. It was also aboard the Endymion that Hall met William Howe De Lancey, who later married Hall's sister Magdalene. De Lancey was struck by a cannonball at the Battle of Waterloo, and it was for her brother that Magdalene wrote A Week at Waterloo in 1815, a poignant narrative describing how she nursed him in his final days.

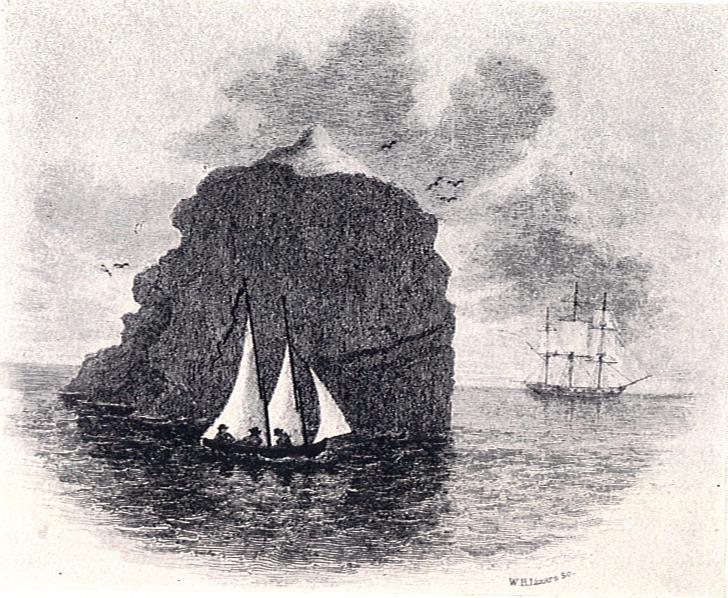
Basil Hall landing on Rockall in 1811

In 1810, he voyaged to Rockall aboard the Endymion and in 1811 was part of the first landing party there. His hazardous exploits in returning with this party were described in Fragments of Voyages and Travels, first published in 1831.

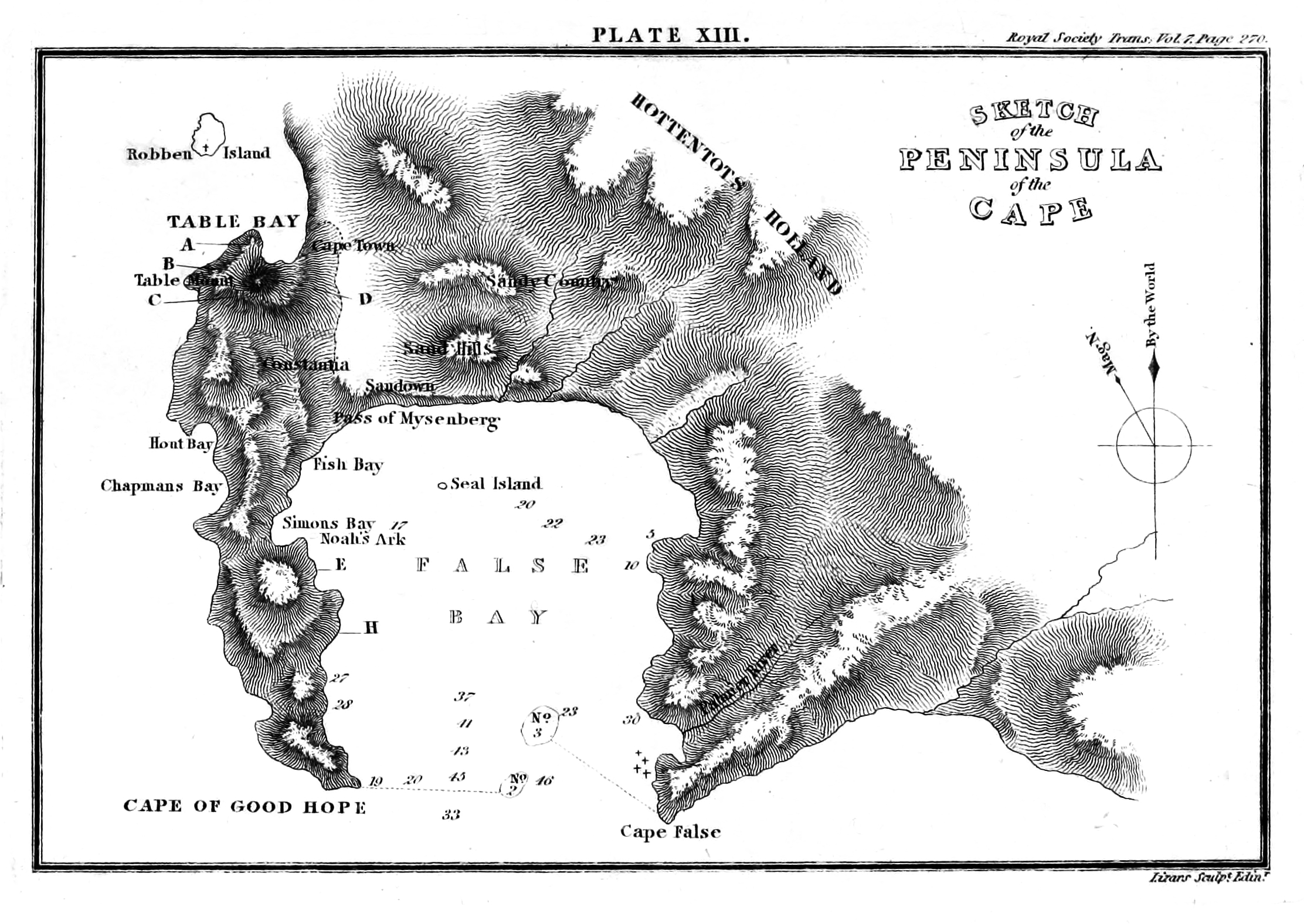
Hall's map accompanying his geological notes (1813)

== Publication on the geology of the Cape of Good Hope ==
In 1813, Hall published, along with Professor John Playfair a description of the granitic intrusions within the sedimentary sandstone structures that he saw in the Platteklip Gorge near the Table Mountain in the Cape of Good Hope. The phenomenon was re-examined at another location called as the Green Point Contact by Charles Darwin in 1836.

== Travels to Java, China, Korea, and the Ryukyu Islands ==
Hall explored Java in 1813 and, as a part of a diplomatic mission to China under Lord Amherst in 1816 undertook surveys of the west coast of Korea and the outlying Ryukyu Islands. This resulted in his book Account of a Voyage of Discovery to the West Coast of Corea and the Great Loo-Choo Island in the Japan Sea (1818), which was one of the first descriptions of Korea by a European.

== Description of an 1815 shipwreck ==
Hall's journals also provide one of the few accounts of the wreck of the Arniston in 1815, which gave its name to the seaside town of Arniston, South Africa. As a captain, he was very critical of the fact that this ship did not have a marine chronometer with which to calculate longitude, and attributed the great loss of life directly to this false economy.

== Interviewing Napoleon ==
In 1817 he also took the opportunity to interview Napoleon (who had been an acquaintance of his father) on St. Helena.

== Travels to Chile, Peru, and Mexico ==
Hall took command of HMS Conway in May 1820 and in August he sailed her to the west coast of South America. He returned to England in spring 1823 and Conway was paid off. His journals of this period became the book, Extracts from a Journal Written on the Coasts of Chile, Peru and Mexico (1823).

== Marriage ==
Following his retirement from the navy in 1823, Hall was married on 1 March 1825 to Margaret Congalton (d. 1876), the youngest daughter of Sir John Hunter, Consul-General in Spain, by his spouse Elizabeth Barbara, sister to Sir William Arbuthnot, 1st Baronet. Hall and Congalton also had a daughter, Eliza, who married Admiral William Charles Chamberlain.

== Travels to South Carolina and Georgia ==
In 1826, when Sir Walter Scott was sunk in depression following his wife's death and financial ruin, it was Hall who organised a trip to Naples for Scott, managing to persuade the government to place a ship at his disposal. In 1828 he was elected into the National Academy of Design as an Honorary Academician. Also that year, Hall and his wife embarked on a two-year tour of North America. In 1828, part of their route saw them travel over land from Charleston, South Carolina, then along the Savannah River by canoe from the ferry landing. They stayed at City Hotel in Savannah, Georgia, a city that Hall found "showy". He "liked the view of the city from the river, the plentiful trees, but did not approve of the wide streets that afforded so little shade".

== Publications about his travels ==
In 1829 Hall published Travels in North America, which caused some offence due to his criticisms of American society. His best-known work was The Fragments of Voyages and Travels (9 volumes, 1831–1840), originally released as a three-yearly series of eight volumes each. He also contributed to the Encyclopædia Britannica and wrote scientific papers on subjects as varied as trade winds, the geology of Table Mountain and a comet he observed in Chile.

== Travels to Styria and influence on Carmilla ==
In 1834, Hall apparently accepted an invitation from Jane Cranstoun, the Countess of Purgstall, to visit her estates in Styria, which she bequeathed two years later to the eminent historian and Orientalist, Joseph von Hammer-Purgstall. The result was Schloss Hainfeld; or, a Winter in Lower Styria, a Gothic travel account, which may have inspired Sheridan Le Fanu's Carmilla.

== Detention and death in a hospital ==
Suffering from mental illness, Hall was detained in the Royal Hospital Haslar in Portsmouth, where he died in 1844, aged 55.

== Bibliography ==
- Account of a Voyage of Discovery to the West Coast of Corea and the Great Loo-Choo Island in the Japan Sea (1818)
- Extracts from a Journal Written on the Coasts of Chili, Peru, and Mexico in the years 1820, 1821, 1822 (1824)
- Travels in North America in the Years 1827 and 1828 (1829)
- Fragments of Voyages and Travels (1831–1833)
- Schloss Hainfeld; or, a Winter in Lower Styria (1836)
- Spain and the Seat of War in Spain (1837)
- Patchwork (3 vols., 1841)
- Travels in India, Ceylon and Borneo

== See also ==
- Hendrick Hamel
