= Hall baronets =

There have been four baronetcies created for persons with the surname Hall, one in the Baronetage of Nova Scotia and three in the Baronetage of the United Kingdom. Three of the creations are extant as of 2026.

- Hall baronets of Dunglass (1687)
- Hall baronets of Llanover (1838): see Benjamin Hall, 1st Baron Llanover
- Hall baronets of Burton Park (1919)
- Hall baronets of Grafham (1923)
