= William Howe De Lancey =

British Army officer (1778–1815)

Colonel Sir William De Lancey KCB
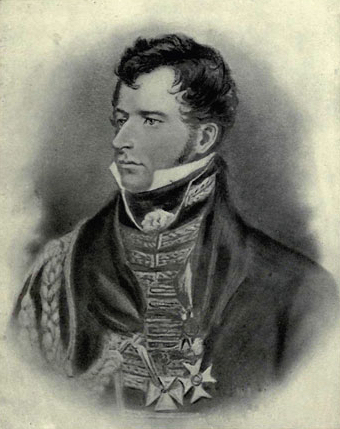
- Sketch of William Howe De Lancey, about 1813
- Born: William Howe De Lancey; 1778; New York City, New York
- Died: 26 June 1815 (aged 37); Mont-Saint-Jean, United Netherlands
- Burial place: Evere, Belgium
- Military career
- Allegiance: United Kingdom
- Branch: British Army
- Service years: 1792–1815
- Rank: Colonel
- Conflicts: French Revolutionary Wars; Peninsular War; Hundred Days (DOW)

Colonel Sir William Howe De Lancey KCB (1778 – 26 June 1815) was an officer in the British Army during the Napoleonic Wars. He died of wounds he received at the Battle of Waterloo.

== Early life ==
De Lancey's paternal ancestors were Huguenots who had emigrated from Caen, France, to America following the revocation of the Edict of Nantes in 1685. His paternal grandmother Phila Franks De Lancey was an Ashkenazi Jew whose parents had immigrated from London to New York in the early eighteenth century.

Born in New York City during its occupation by the British, De Lancey was the only son of Stephen De Lancey (1748–1798), who was clerk of the city and county of Albany in 1765, lieutenant-colonel of the 1st New Jersey loyal volunteers in 1782, afterwards chief justice of the Bahamas, and in 1796 governor of Tobago; and who married Cornelia, daughter of the Rev. H. Barclay of Trinity Church, New York. He was the grandson of Major-General Oliver De Lancey Sr. (1708–1785) and a great-grandson of Etienne de Lancey, who became known as Stephen Delancey (1663–1741).

He married in Edinburgh, on 4 April 1815, Magdalene (1793–1822), one of the three daughters of Sir James Hall of Dunglass, fourth baronet (1761–1832) and Lady Helen Douglas (1762–1837), a daughter of Dunbar Douglas, 4th Earl of Selkirk. De Lancey and Magdalene had been married less than three months when he died. They had no issue.

De Lancey's father, Stephen, and many other members of the De Lancey family of New York, were supporters of King George III during the American Revolution. The United States and Great Britain signed the Treaty of Paris officially ending the war in 1783, and as a result the De Lancey property was confiscated and the family was forced to flee to England.

A number of De Lanceys and their friends, including Stephen's family, moved to Beverley, Yorkshire, where William Howe De Lancey attended Beverley Grammar School. The family later resided in London. William attended Harrow School from 12 December 1789 until December 1791. In 1798, his father, who was serving as Governor of Tobago, died at Portsmouth, New Hampshire, while travelling to England to rejoin his family.

== Early military service ==
De Lancey obtained a cornetcy in the 16th Light Dragoons on 7 July 1792, and was promoted Lieutenant on 26 February 1793. His name appears in the returns for a short time as adjutant at Sheffield. He purchased an independent company on 25 March 1794 and was transferred to the newly raised 80th Regiment of Foot, which he accompanied to the East Indies in 1795. On 20 October 1796 he was transferred to a troop in the 17th Light Dragoons, of which his uncle, General Oliver De Lancey, was then colonel, but appears to have remained some time after in the East Indies.

In 1799 he was in command of a detached troop of the 17th Light Dragoons in Kent, and on 17 October in that year was appointed major in the 45th Regiment of Foot, the headquarters of which were then in the West Indies. He appears to have been detained on service in Europe until the return home of the regiment, soon after which, in 1802, he was transferred to the permanent staff of the quartermaster-general's department as deputy-assistant quartermaster-general. No departmental record of his services is extant.

== Peninsular War ==
De Lancey was stationed for some time at York and in Ireland, and afterwards proceeded to Spain, and as assistant quartermaster-general, and later as deputy quartermaster-general, with various divisions of the Peninsular Army, rendered valuable service throughout the campaigns from 1809 to 1814. He was mentioned in despatches for his conduct at the passage of the Douro and capture of Oporto in 1809; at the siege and capture of Ciudad Rodrigo in 1811; and at the Battle of Vittoria in 1813, when he was deputy quartermaster-general with Sir Thomas Graham. After the peace he was created K.C.B. On 4 April 1815 he married Magdalene, second daughter of Sir James Hall, 4th Baronet of Dunglass, and sister of Captain Basil Hall.

== Waterloo Campaign and death ==
On the return of Napoleon Bonaparte from Elba, De Lancey was appointed deputy quartermaster-general of the army in Belgium, replacing Sir Hudson Lowe, whom the Duke of Wellington disliked. He arrived in Brussels on 9 May. From the moment news reached Wellington that the French had crossed the border De Lancey was busy. Although invited, he and his wife, who had arrived a day or two before, were unable to go to the Duchess of Richmond's ball. On the 17th when the allied army retreated from Quatre Bras to Waterloo he allocated the positions that the troops were to occupy by ordering stakes placed in the ground where the regiments were to be for the next day's battle, which according to S. G. P. Ward writing in the Oxford Dictionary of National Biography was "to the rear, apparently, of the ground originally chosen by the duke".

On 18 June 1815, during the Battle of Waterloo, while he was talking to the Duke of Wellington, De Lancey was struck in the back by a ricocheting cannonball leaving his skin unbroken but causing fatal internal injuries. Believing him dead, Wellington wrote in his dispatch of the battle that his death was "a serious loss to His Majesty's service, and to me". The Duke of Wellington gave the following version of the occurrence to Samuel Rogers:

De Lancey was with me, and speaking to me when he was struck. We were on a point of land that overlooked the plain. I had just been warned off by some soldiers (but as I saw well from it, and two divisions were engaging below, I said "Never mind"), when a ball came bounding along en ricochet, as it is called, and, striking him on the back, sent him many yards over the head of his horse. He fell on his face, and bounded upwards and fell again. All the staff dismounted and ran to him, and when I came up he said, "Pray tell them to leave me and let me die in peace." I had him conveyed to the rear, and two days after, on my return from Brussels, I saw him in a barn, and he spoke with such strength that I said (for I had reported him killed), "Why! De Lancey, you will have the advantage of Sir Condy in 'Castle Rackrent'——you will know what your friends said of you after you were dead." "I hope I shall," he replied. Poor fellow! We knew each other ever since we were boys. But I had no time to be sorry. I went on with the army, and never saw him again.

De Lancey was taken to a peasant's cottage in the village of Waterloo, where, after a delay of 24 hours due to the misinformation that he was dead, he was tenderly nursed by his young wife. A week later, on 26 June, he succumbed to his injuries, which included eight broken ribs. Magdalene de Lancey left a manuscript account of his last days, which was published in 1906 under the title of A Week at Waterloo in June 1815. De Lancey was buried in the Saint Josse Ten Noode cemetery, on the Louvain road, a mile from Brussels, and when that cemetery was destroyed in 1889 his remains were reinterred in the crypt under the British Waterloo Campaign Monument in the cemetery of Evere, three miles north-east of Brussels.

"Fair lady's love, and splendid fame,

De Lancey did enthral. His loyal heart alike they claim,

They sigh to see him fall."

== Family ==
Magdalene de Lancey married again in 1817 Captain Henry Harvey, Madras infantry, who retired in 1821. She died in 1822 giving birth to her third child. A sister of De Lancey, widow of Colonel Johnston, 28th Regiment of Foot, married on 16 December 1816 Lieutenant-general Sir Hudson Lowe, and was mother of Major-general Edward W. De Lancey Lowe.

== Character ==
De Lancey was described by the military writer David Howarth as a remarkable staff officer; "young, brilliant, handsome and likeable". He spent almost the entire night before Waterloo writing and dispatching Wellington's orders, while his young wife Magdalene watched in silence. After the battle she cared for him for six days, in a cottage at Mont St. Jean, until he died of his wounds.

== Cultural references ==
William Howe De Lancey was played by Ian Ogilvy in the 1970 epic film Waterloo.

De Lancey also featured in the BBC's 2015 adaptation of Jonathan Strange & Mr Norrell, played by Mark Edel-Hunt.
