= Hall baronets of Grafham (1923) =

The Hall baronetcy, of Grafham in the County of Surrey, was created in the Baronetage of the United Kingdom on 5 March 1923 for the businessman and Conservative politician Frederick Hall.

== Hall baronets, of Grafham (1923) ==
- Sir Frederick Hall, 1st Baronet (1864–1932)
- Sir Frederick Henry Hall, 2nd Baronet (1899–1949)
- Sir (Frederick) John Frank Hall, 3rd Baronet (1931–2013)
- Sir David Christopher Hall, 4th Baronet (born 1937)

The heir apparent is the present holder's son John Christopher Hall (born 1965).
