= Hall baronets of Burton Park (1919) =

The Hall baronetcy, of Burton Park, in the parish of Burton in the County of Sussex, was created in the Baronetage of the United Kingdom on 18 September 1919 for the Conservative politician Douglas Hall. He was the son of Bernard Hall, the first ever Mayor of the City of Liverpool.

== Hall baronets, of Burton Park (1919) ==
Hall baronets of Burton Park
- Crest: A talbot's head erased Sable ears Argent gorged with a chaplet Or garnished with roses Gules between two cross crosslets fitchee Gold.
- Shield: Vert on a fess Or between in chief a cross crosslet fitchee between two talbot's heads erased Argent collared and ringed Gules and in base a like talbot's head three escallops Sable.
- Motto: In Deo Fides

- Sir Douglas Bernard Hall, 1st Baronet (1866–1923)
- Sir Douglas Montgomery Bernard Hall, 2nd Baronet (1891–1962)
- Sir John Bernard Hall, 3rd Baronet (1932–2018)
- Sir David Bernard Hall, 4th Baronet (born 1961)

There is no heir to the title.
