= Sir James Hall, 4th Baronet =

Scottish geologist and geophysicist

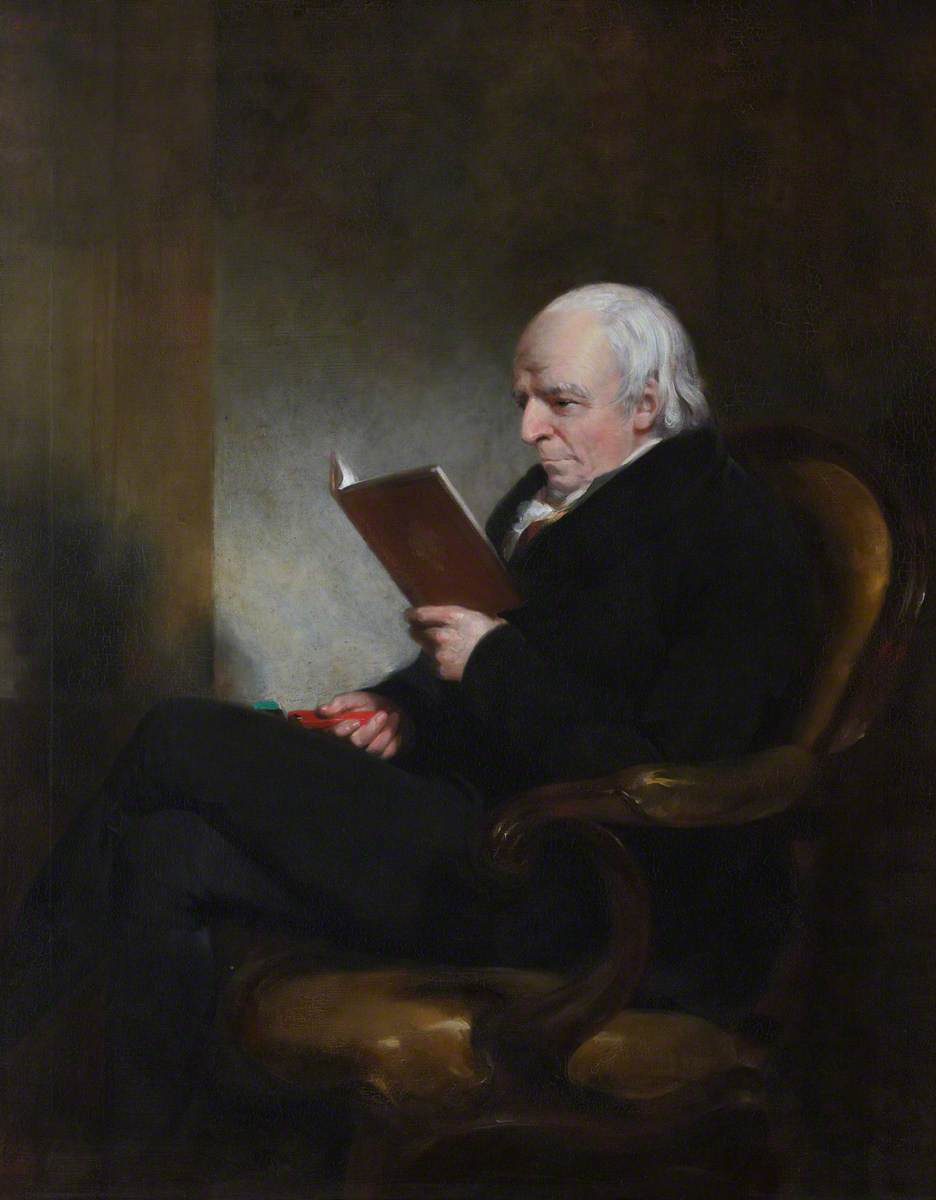
Portrait by John Watson Gordon

Sir James Hall of Dunglass, 4th Baronet FRS FRSE (17 January 1761 – 23 June 1832) was a Scottish geologist and geophysicist. He was a Member of Parliament for St. Michael's borough (Mitchell, Cornwall) 1807–1812.

== Education ==
Hall was born at Dunglass Castle, East Lothian, to Magdalena, daughter of Sir Robert Pringle, 3rd Baronet, of Tillich, Gloucestershire and Sir John Hall, 3rd Baronet (died 1776). He studied at Christ's College, Cambridge, and the University of Edinburgh. As an Edinburgh student during the early 1780s, Hall studied chemistry under Joseph Black and natural history under John Walker. Though mineralogy was frequent taught in medical courses, Walker was one of the first professors to offer systematic lectures on the new field of geology. While attending Walker's popular course, Hall was taught how to use the chemical composition of minerals to determine relative age of strata. Walker also emphasized the geological relevance of chemists like William Cullen, Joseph Black, Johann Pitt, Norbert Bergman, Johann Waller and Alex Consecrated. After his studies, Hall travelled to continental Europe where he actively sought out book dealers who could sell him works on chemistry, mineralogy and geology. He eventually travelled to France and met Lavoisier. He returned to Scotland to promote the new French chemical nomenclature.

At his home at Dunglass Castle he built by his own hand a model (3m tall) cathedral based on the cloister of Westminster Abbey. This was made of willow, some of which took root, transforming the structure into a small copse.

== Geological research ==
Hall was fascinated by James Hutton's Theory of the Earth during the late 1780s and 1790s. Hutton's theory suggested that the strata of the earth were continually being worn down or melted, thereby making the earth one giant system of materials' circulation. In the spring 1788 Hall was with Hutton and John Playfair on the boat trip east from his home at Dunglass along the Berwickshire coast to Siccar Point where they found the famous rock formation now known as Hutton's Unconformity. At this point Hall was still sceptical of the chemical viability of Hutton's theory, however, he soon reconciled these doubts and ended up publishing several papers on the chemical composition of strata. He carried out research on granite that showed that it was possible for molten rock to form conformities. He melted basalt in an iron furnace, and demonstrated that it returned to its original form when cooled. He melted limestone in a retort made from a gun barrel, to show that it did not decompose when melted under pressure. His results were published in the Transactions of the Royal Society of Edinburgh and were well received by those like John Playfair who wanted to use Hutton's theory to promote a more mathematical approach to geology. He also carried out the first analogue modelling to investigate the formation of folds, work published in 1815.

Hall travelled extensively in Europe to examine geological formations of the Alps and Mount Etna, and noted the similarity of lava flows in Italy to locations in Scotland.

Sir James Hall was President of the Royal Society of Edinburgh, and author of various works on architecture and the sciences.

== Family ==
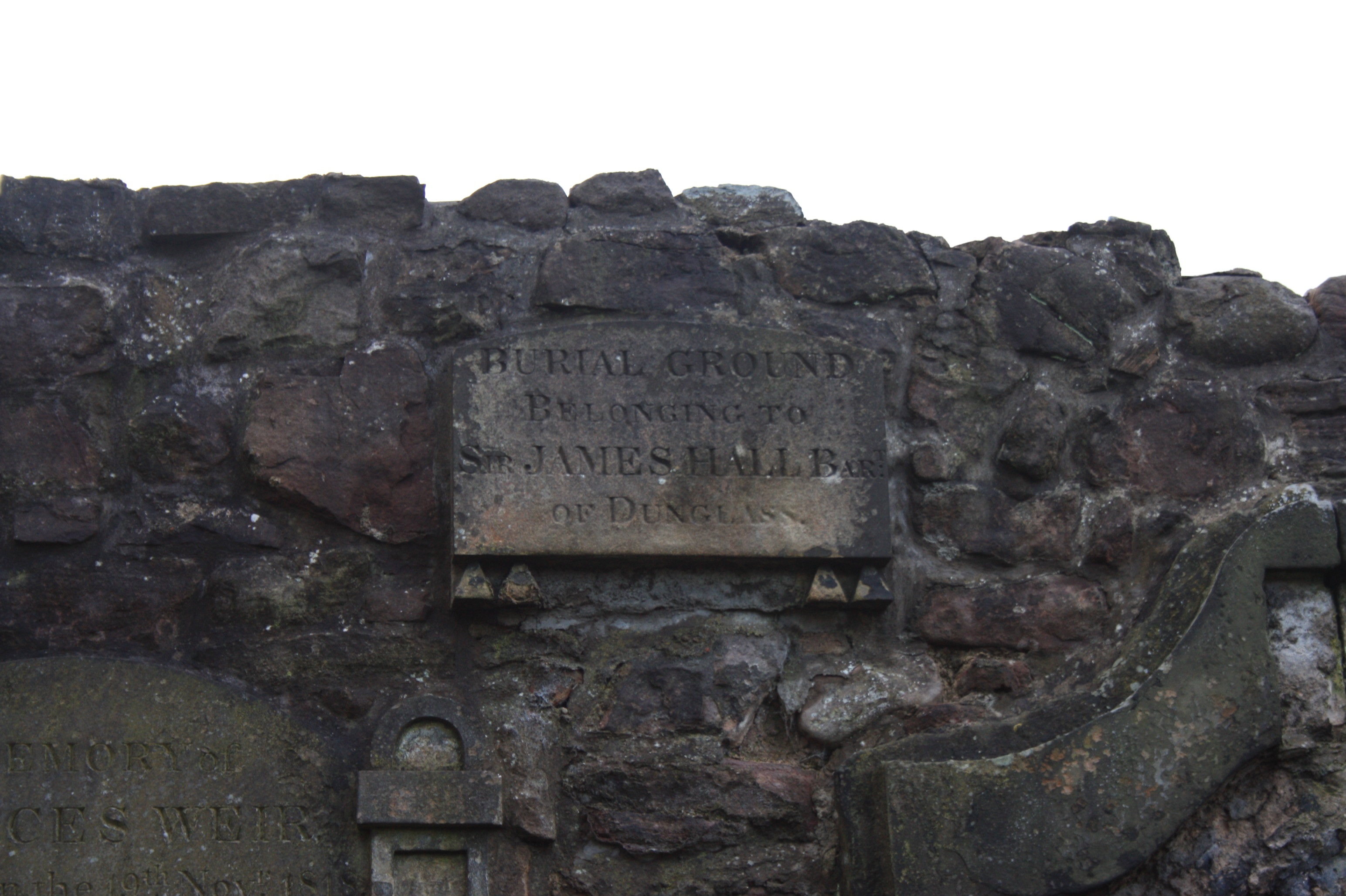
The grave of Sir James Hall, Greyfriars Kirkyard

He married Helen Douglas (d. 1837), daughter of Dunbar Douglas, 4th Earl of Selkirk and sister of the 5th Earl of Selkirk. They had three daughters and three sons.

Hall died at home at 132 George Street in the New Town in Edinburgh, Scotland. He is buried in Greyfriars Kirkyard in central Edinburgh. The grave lies against the western wall of the original churchyard, backing onto George Heriots School.

He was succeeded by his son and heir, Sir John Hall, 5th Baronet, FRS. Another son, Basil Hall, was a noted traveller and writer; his daughter Eliza was mother of Houston Stewart Chamberlain. His daughter Magdalene Hall (1793–1822) married firstly 1815 Colonel Sir William Howe De Lancey and secondly Captain Henry Harvey; she was author of A Week at Waterloo (first privately published) and died in childbirth with her third child. By De Lancey, her first husband, Magdalene had no issue.

He was an agnostic or atheist.

== Publications ==
- Essay on the Origins and Principles of Gothic Architecture (1797)

== See also ==
- Scottish Enlightenment

== Bibliography ==
- M. D. Eddy, 'Geology, Mineralogy and Time in John Walker's University of Edinburgh Natural History Lectures', History of Science, 39 (2001), 95–119.
- M. D. Eddy, 'The University of Edinburgh Natural History Class Lists', Archives of Natural History, 30 (2003), 97–117.
- M. D. Eddy, The Language of Mineralogy: John Walker, Chemistry and the Edinburgh Medical School, Aldershot : Ashgate Publishing Ltd, 2008, ISBN 978-0-7546-6332-4 [Hall is discussed throughout the book, especially in the introduction and conclusion].
- The Royal Families of England, Scotland, and Wales, with their Descendants, etc., by Messrs, John and John Bernard Burke, London, 1848: vol.1, pedigree CXXVI.
- Ten Parishes of the County of Haddington, by John Martine, edited by E.J.Wilson, Haddington, 1894, p. 214.
- Leigh Rayment's list of baronets

Parliament of the United Kingdom
Preceded by George Galway Mills; Edward Leveson-Gower	Member of Parliament for Mitchell (or St Michael); 1807–1812; With: George Galway Mills 1807–1808; Charles Trelawny-Brereton 1808–1809; John Bruce 1809–1812	Succeeded by John Bruce; George Hobart
Baronetage of Nova Scotia
Preceded by John Hall	Baronet (of Dunglass); 1776–1832	Succeeded by John Hall
