= Dunglass Castle, East Lothian =

Demolished castle in Scotland

Coordinates: 55.9386°N 2.3754°W

Designations

Inventory of Gardens and Designed Landscapes in Scotland
- Official name: Dunglass
- Designated: 30 June 1987
- Reference no.: GDL00154

Dunglass Castle was a castle at Dunglass in East Lothian, Scotland. It was a seat of the Home family and frequently visited by the Stewart kings. A fortification was built during the war known as "Rough Wooing". There are no upstanding masonry remains of the castle. A more recent mansion has also been demolished. The medieval Dunglass Collegiate Church at the site is maintained by Historic Environment Scotland.

== Origins ==
The first medieval castle at Dunglass was built by the Pepdie family in the 14th century. On the marriage of Nicola Pepdie to Sir Thomas Home of Home, the castle and lands passed to the Home family. James IV stayed at Dunglass in December 1496, and played cards. He gave a tip, also known as "drinksilver", to masons working on the building and enjoyed a banquet which included spices brought from Edinburgh.

== Regent Albany ==
Alexander Home, 3rd Lord Home was allied with Margaret Tudor against John Stewart, Duke of Albany, Regent of Scotland. Albany brought his army to Dunbar and Dunglass in October 1515. The Earl of Home was persuaded to meet Albany at Dunglass and was arrested. Home was able to make an alliance with the Earl of Arran against Albany. Home was executed in 1516 and the family were forfeited, and for a time the castle passed to Archibald Douglas, 6th Earl of Angus. Dunglass was besieged and slighted by the English under the command of Henry Percy, 6th Earl of Northumberland in the winter of 1532.

== Rough Wooing ==
In September 1547, during the war now known as the Rough Wooing, Dunglass was captured by the forces of the Duke of Somerset from George Douglas of Pittendreich, and was refortified and garrisoned by the English. According to the English journalist of the campaign, William Patten, the Scottish captain of the castle, Matthew Home, had only 21 soldiers, and surrendered without a fight. John Brende led 300 workmen, called "pioneers" to demolish the old fortifications. The walls had solid foundations in the craggy bedrock. Some of the stone was taken to Eyemouth, where Richard Lee was building an artillery fort on a new site. Richard Lee seems to have been the designer of the new English fort at Dunglass, with his assistant William Ridgeway.

In January 1549, the French landed two boat loads of ladders at Dunbar, intending to attack the English garrison, but they did not make an assault. The English soldiers were entertained by two Irish minstrels on 9 July 1549. The garrison was commanded by Sir Thomas Holcroft.

A new artillery fortification was built on new a site nearby overlooking the remains of the older castle of the Home family, set out by Richard Lee. He also enclosed the village of Dunglass with a rampart. The Earl of Shrewsbury envisaged the fortified site would be a base for the whole English army, but Protector Somerset objected to the increasing cost. During September 1549, Holcroft reported the "fort now groweth in a great strength". He described his men's "continual labour of carrying baskets, sods, and going to the wood, watching", despite sickness in the camp. The captains were Christopher Asheton, followed by Francis Aslaby. It was one of the most expensive works undertaken during the war, costing £2,300.

The French diplomat in London, Odet de Selve, heard news of the building of the fort on a hill near the sea. He obtained a plan made by a spy in December 1548, and commented that the fort itself was small, and had no battery of guns on one side which was defended only by the steep valley of the Dunglass water. According to Jean de Beaugué, the new site was hard to defend and had no water.

On 31 January 1550, soldiers from Dunglass fired two barn yards at the Place of Nether Keith and burnt houses in the village. The English raiders were chased back to Dunglass. Regent Arran gave orders for cannon to be shipped to bombard the fort on 11 April 1550. The Earl of Rutland was at Dunglass in May 1550 and took the opportunity to have his mail armour scoured in a bag of bran and had his pistol mended. He bought white fabric in the camp at Dunglass to modify his hose for the hot weather in July.

The fort at Dunglass was surrendered to the French in March 1550. In June, after the Treaty of Norham, the remaining cannon were taken to Dunbar Castle and the villagers in the area were summoned to slight the fort. In France, Henry II organised a triumphal entry to Rouen on 1 October 1550. Mary of Guise and Mary, Queen of Scots took part. The entertainment included verses and banners and representing Dunglass and the other surrendered fortresses in Scotland.

== Earls of Home ==
After going to Jedburgh to hold justice courts, and viewing the English town of Berwick-upon-Tweed from Calf Hill in April 1588, James VI rode to Dunglass Castle to banquet with Lord Home.

Lord Home invited an English official, John Carey, to come from Berwick to meet James VI at Dunglass in January 1595, but Carey refused to make the trip. James VI made a hunting trip to the area in February, planning to visit Dunglass, Spott, Beil, Waughton, and Seton.

In October 1595 Christian Douglas, Lady Home moved her best household goods from Dunglass to Fife, sparking rumours of a marital separation. James VI stayed with Lord Home at Dunglass Castle on 13 March 1596, for his "sports". King James alarmed the English garrison by coming to hunt near Berwick-upon-Tweed, staying a night the house of the laird of Billie, six miles from Berwick, and then returning to Dunglass.

The castle was rebuilt, in an enlarged and improved form, and gave accommodation on 5 and 6 April 1603 to King James, and all his retinue, on his journey to London to take up the English throne at the Union of the Crowns.

The castle and gardens, including the "Priest's Yard", were improved by Mary, Countess of Home and her husband, Alexander Home, 1st Earl of Home. Some of the luxurious furnishing of the castle and its long gallery are recorded in inventories made by the Countess of Home. On 13 May 1617, the Earl of Home escorted King James from Berwick to Dunglass, where an entertainment including flattering poems by William Struthers and David Hume of Godscroft delivered by Alexander Hume, the schoolmaster of Prestonpans. David Hume of Godscroft wrote a Latin verse to be said on this occasion which contrasted Mary's rebuilding of the earl's houses with the destruction wrought by her grandfather during the war of the Rough Wooing. He refers to the improving work of her English hand;

Mentiar; aut nullis horrendam ducimus Anglam,
Judice te; vultum respice, sive animum.
Nec fera miscemus, truculento, proelia, Marte:
Sed colimus, casti, foedera sancta, thori.
Hinc surgunt mihi structa palatia, diruit Angla
Quae quondam, melior iam struit Angla manus:
Hinc quam fausta tibi procederet UNIO, si sic
Exemplo, saperes Insula tota, meo.

Either I'm a liar, or we think that an Englishwoman is not terrible in any respect, as you judge: just consider her countenance or her mind. Nor shall we join battles in cruel war, but rather we are observing the sacred laws of a chaste marriage. Hence a castle, built for me, which an English hand had once demolished, a better English hand is now rebuilding. Hence this union will go prosperously for you and your entire island, if you grow wise after my example.

The King stayed at Dunglass another day, and then rode with the Earl of Home to Pencraig by East Linton Bridge, to meet the Earl of Winton. According to some sources, on the second day at Dunglass, the King may have visited "Cavard" or Cavers Castle, where he knighted William Fenwick.

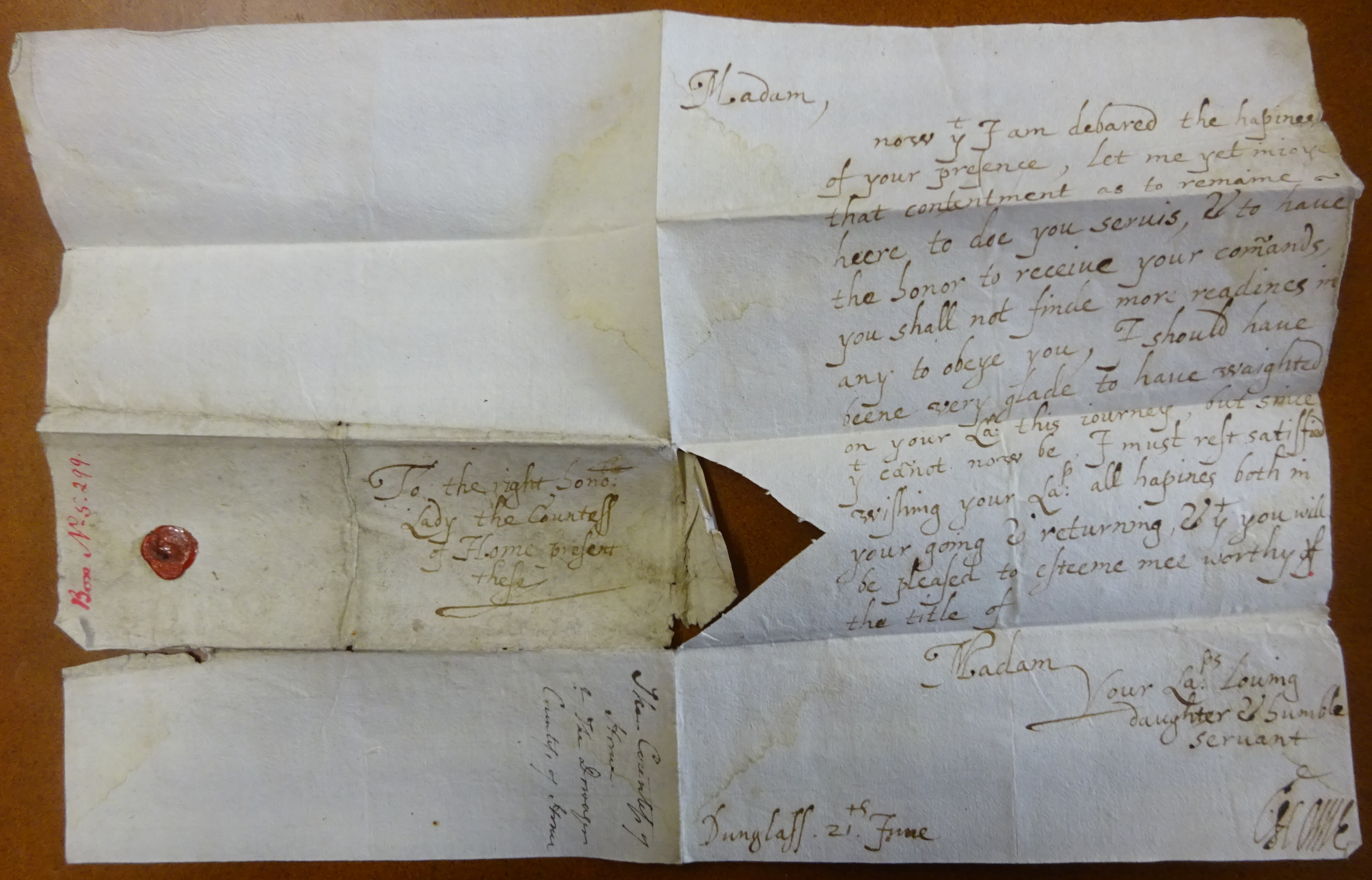
A letter from Grace Fane, Countess of Home to the Dowager Countess of Home, written at Dunglass Castle

James Home, 2nd Earl of Home married Grace Fane (died 1633). She was living at Dunglass in 1630 and her mother, Mary Mildmay Fane, Countess of Westmorland, wrote to her from Apethorpe with family news and concerns for her health. It was intended that Charles I would stop at Dunglass during his progress to Scotland in 1633, but the plan was changed after the death of the owner James Home, 2nd Earl of Home. The King was escorted from Berwick to Dunglass on 12 June by 600 Home family followers wearing green satin doublets and white taffeta scarfs. He stayed the night at Dunglass, but "at his own charge", and went on to Seton Palace the next day. In 1636 William Brereton noted that the castle was "pleasantly seated, and seems to be in good repair".

== Explosion in 1640 ==
This castle was destroyed on 30 August 1640 when held by a party of Covenanters under Thomas Hamilton, 2nd Earl of Haddington. According to Scotstarvet, an English page, Edward Paris, vexed by an insult against his countrymen, thrust a red-hot iron into a powder barrel. He was killed, with the Earl, his half-brother, Richard, and many others. Archibald Campbell of Glencarradale survived and help organise the earl's funeral. A pamphlet with a verse account of the explosion and a list of casualties was published by the author and poet William Lithgow. He named thirty nine dead including five women, and John White, an English plasterer working for Lady Home.

The diplomat Thomas Roe and Elizabeth Stuart, Queen of Bohemia mentioned the explosion in their correspondence. The sister of the Countess of Home, Mistress Anne Dudley had been her childhood companion. Roe heard there had been sixty casualties, forty of them gentlemen of quality. Elizabeth of Bohemia wished her brother Charles I would be speedily delivered from his troubles.

The Hall family acquired the estate in 1687. The Rough Wooing artillery fort, which survives in outline earthworks, was repurposed as a garden feature with a summerhouse and bowling green by Sir John Hall before 1760 when the antiquarian Richard Pococke saw it.

== Final phase and demise ==
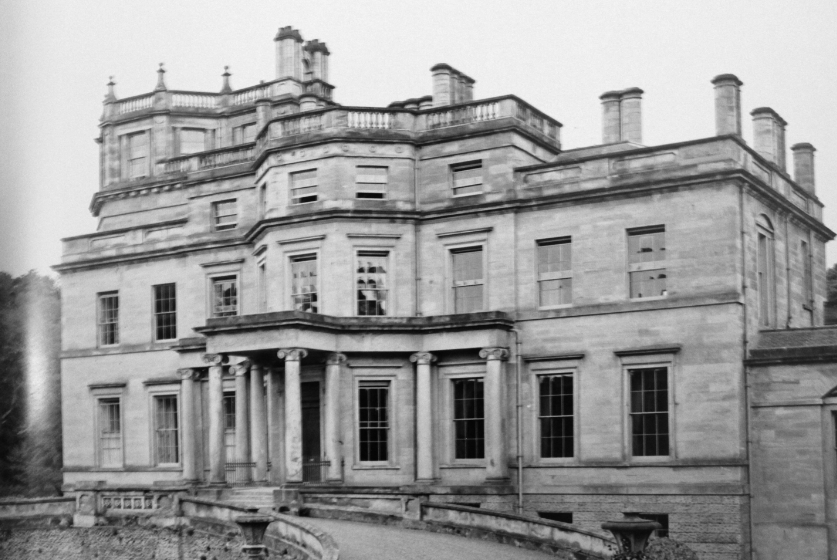
Dunglass Castle c.1920

Sir James Hall of Dunglass, who inherited the estate in 1776, commissioned architect and artist Alexander Nasmyth to design a new building on the site. The design included elements copied from Castle Howard and also had a tall belvedere for viewing over the estate.

Francis James Usher bought the house and gardens from Sir John Richard Hall in 1918 or 1919, and the wider estate remains in the Usher family ownership. In 1920 Usher employed Ernest Auldjo Jamieson to modernise the house (and add electricity). New furniture was commissioned from Whytock & Reid in Edinburgh. The First world War caused huge problems in terms of loss of the vast staff required (not just through death but through reluctance to return to such poor wages) and despite its recent modernisation the house fell into rapid decline. The house was photographed by Country Life magazine in 1925, creating a record of its grandeur in use as a house. It was requisitioned for use as a school during the Second World War and had a fire in 1947. It was destroyed by a controlled explosion in 1958. A smaller house was built on the site.

The estate site is now known as Dunglass Dean.
