= Oliver De Lancey (American loyalist) =

American politician (1718–1785)

- Born: September 17, 1718; New York City, Province of New York, British North America
- Died: October 27, 1785 (aged 67); Beverley, Yorkshire, England
- Relatives: Etienne Delancey (father); Anne Van Cortland (mother); James DeLancey (brother)
- Military career
- Allegiance: Kingdom of Great Britain
- Branch: New York Provincial Militia (1755–1763); British Army (1776–1783)
- Service years: 1746–1748; 1755–1766; 1776–1777
- Rank: Brigadier General
- Nickname: Outlaw of the Bronx
- Units: Rogers' Rangers; DeLancey's Brigade; Queen's Rangers; King's Rangers
- Conflicts: French and Indian War; Battle of Carillon (1758); American Revolutionary War

Oliver De Lancey (September 17, 1718 – October 27, 1785) was a merchant and Loyalist politician and soldier during the American Revolutionary War. His surname is also sometimes written as de Lancey or Delancey.

== Career ==
The son of Etienne Delancey and Anne Van Cortland, De Lancey was born on September 17, 1718, in New York City, Province of New York. The De Lancey family was of Huguenot descent. From 1754 to 1757, De Lancey served as a New York alderman for the Out Ward and was a member of the New York assembly from New York County from 1756 to 1761.

During the French and Indian War, he was selected by the New York Assembly, with the support of his brother James, then acting Governor, to provide provisions for New York provincial units. During the war, De Lancey commanded the New York Provincial Militia, 1755–1763, and commanded a provincial detachment in the Ticonderoga campaign of 1758. In 1766, De Lancey was one of the judges in the Pendergast case, in which the alleged leader of the Dutchess County land rebels was convicted and sentenced to death.

De Lancey was a member of the provincial executive council from 1760 until the American Revolutionary War. In 1768, he allied himself with Isaac Sears and the Sons of Liberty. De Lancey spoke out against the Boston Port Act of 1774 but did not support nonimportation. He was one of the persons responsible for the creation of the Committee of Fifty. In 1773, he was appointed colonel in chief of the Southern Military District.

During the war, De Lancey was a senior officer in the Loyalist irregular military hierarchy. He joined Sir William Howe on Staten Island in 1776, and he and his nephew raised and equipped the three battalions of De Lancey's Brigade, consisting of fifteen hundred Loyalist volunteers from the Province of New York. He served as the brigade's commanding officer on Long Island. His property was plundered by Patriots in November 1777 and confiscated in October 1779.

De Lancey left New York for England in 1783 and died on October 27, 1785, in Beverley, Yorkshire. He was buried in Beverley Minster, where his grave and memorial can be visited.

== Family ==
In the fall of 1742, Oliver De Lancey secretly married Phila Franks, the colonial-born daughter of prominent and successful London-born, New York Ashkenazi Jewish immigrants. For six months, they kept the match secret, but in the spring of 1743, Phila announced the union and went to live with her husband. The letters of Abigail Franks, Phila's mother, to her son Naphtali in England speak of her sense of betrayal and her pain, and she never spoke to Phila again. Phila's father, on the other hand, accepted the marriage.

Phila and Oliver de Lancey had at least two sons and two daughters:

- Stephen (1748–1798) became clerk of the city and county of Albany in 1765, Lieutenant Colonel of the 1st New Jersey Loyal Volunteers in 1782, afterwards Chief Justice of the Bahamas, and in 1796 Governor of Tobago. He married Cornelia, daughter of the Rev. H. Barclay of Trinity Church, New York. They had several children, including William Howe De Lancey, a British staff officer mortally wounded at the Battle of Waterloo.
- Oliver (ca. 1749–1822) became a general in the British Army, and who also had a son called Oliver (1803–1837), who served as a British Army officer and was killed in action while fighting for the British Legion during the First Carlist War.
- Philadelphia (Phila) de Lancy (1758–1785) married Stephen Payne-Gallwey, son of the Governor and Chief Justice of St Kitts, Leeward Islands, in 1774, and they settled in West Tofts, Norfolk, England.
- Susanna De Lancey married William Draper

De Lancey's nephew James served in De Lancey's Brigade and later commanded his own ranger unit, De Lancey's Cowboys.
