= De Lancey's Brigade =

- Country: Great Britain
- Allegiance: British Army
- Branch: British Provincial unit
- Type: infantry, dragoons (mounted infantry), (auxiliary troops)
- Role: intelligence, special operations, maneuver warfare, guerrilla warfare, light infantry, cavalry, cattle raiding
- Size: three battalions (500 each), brigade (1,500)
- Garrison/HQ: Oyster Bay, Huntington, Brookhaven, Long Island, Kingsbridge, Bronx (Province of New York)
- Nicknames: De Lancey's Volunteers, De Lancey's Corps, De Lancey's Provincial Corps, De Lancey's Refugees, Refugees, Cowboys, Cow-boys
- Engagements: American Revolutionary War: New York Campaign (1776); Battle of Brooklyn (1776); Siege of Ninety-Six (1781); Battle of Eutaw Springs (1781); Battle of Pine's Bridge (1781)

Commanders
- Notable commanders: Brigadier General Oliver De Lancey

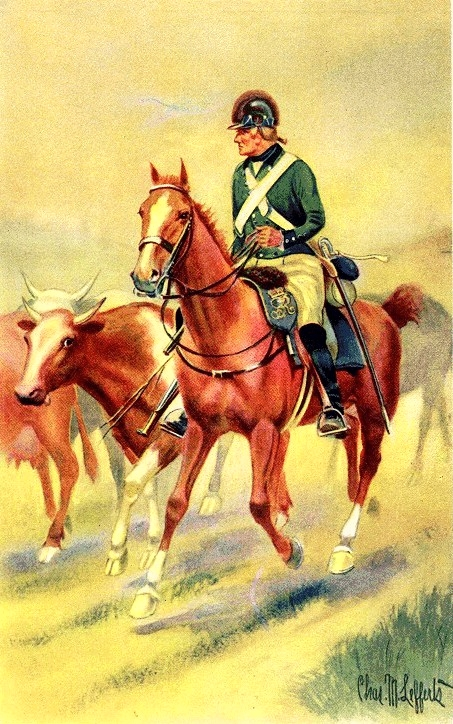
Private, De Lancey's Westchester Light Horse Battalion, 1780, by Charles M. Lefferts.

De Lancey's Brigade, also known as De Lancey's Volunteers, De Lancey's Corps, and De Lancey's Provincial Corps, was a British Loyalist provincial military unit, raised for service during the American War of Independence. Its commander was Brigadier General Oliver De Lancey.

Oliver's nephew, James De Lancey, commanded his own unit of rangers or partisans. That unit, known as De Lancey's Raiders, De Lancey's Refugees, Westchester Refugees, and the "Cowboys" or "Cow-boys," harassed the enemy near New York City and procured supplies for the British army by conducting cattle raids. James acquired the sobriquet “Outlaw of the Bronx” (he had his headquarters near the Bronx River.) It was James De Lancey's Cowboys who ambushed and brutally killed Col. Christopher Greene in the Battle of Pine's Bridge. The Cowboys often operated under the broader umbrella of the De Lancey name and worked closely with the Brigade.

== History ==
De Lancey's Brigade was raised in September 1776 on Long Island, New York, after the Patriot forces had lost the Battle of Brooklyn during the British New York Campaign. The Brigade consisted of three battalions of five hundred men each, with De Lancey serving both as brigadier general and colonel of the 1st Battalion.

In the winter of 1776–1777, De Lancey's three battalions were stationed (one each) at Oyster Bay, Huntington, Brookhaven, Long Island, and Kingsbridge, Bronx. In May 1777, the 1st and 2nd Battalions moved to the Kingsbridge area, north of Manhattan. The following month, the 1st returned to Long Island, while the 2nd remained at Kingsbridge. In the spring of 1778, the forts that had been erected at Huntington and Brookhaven were abandoned, and the 1st and 3rd Battalions were removed to encamp near New Town.

Brigadier General Oliver De Lancy conducted regular military operations in the region north of New York City, in Westchester County, New York, between Morrisania and the Croton Rivers, which was known as the Neutral Ground. Guerrilla warfare was carried out by James De Lancey's Cowboys and their compatriots, Brigadier General Cortlandt Skinner's Greens, known by their nickname, "Skinner's Skinners" (the term "skinners" was also applied to all marauders, including Patriot-aligned guerrilla bands). Both were groups of Loyalist marauders who stole cattle, looted, and gathered military intelligence in the New York countryside.

In November 1778, although the Brigade had originally been formed "for the defense of Long Island", the 1st and 2nd Battalions were ordered South, where they served under Lt. Col. Archibald Campbell. The 1st and 2nd Battalions fought successfully in the Siege of Ninety-Six and at the Battle of Eutaw Springs and other battles in the Carolinas. The 3rd Battalion remained on Long Island for the entire war, as did De Lancey himself.

The entire brigade was disbanded in Woodstock, New Brunswick in 1783. Many of the regiment settled in Nova Scotia after the war. A detachment of the 2nd regiment was shipwrecked off the coast of Nova Scotia on 27 April 1783, killing 99 of 174 on board.
