= Sir John Hall, 3rd Baronet =

Sir John Hall of Dunglass, 3rd Baronet (died 3 July 1776), was one of the Grand Jury for the trial of the Jacobite rising of 1745 rebels at Edinburgh, 1748.

He was retoured heir of line and conquest on 4 January 1750, to his uncle, William Hall of Whitehall, near Chirnside, one of the Principal Clerks of the Court of Session. (National Archives, GD206/1/63).

Sir John married Magdalen (d. 1763), daughter of Sir Robert Pringle, 3rd Baronet, of Stitchill, and was succeeded by his son and heir Sir James Hall, 4th Baronet.

Hall made his home at Dunglass Castle, East Lothian, building a summerhouse and bowling green on the site of an artillery fort constructed during the war known as the Rough Wooing.

Baronetage of Nova Scotia
Preceded by James Hall	Baronet (of Dunglass); 1742–1776	Succeeded by James Hall
