= James De Lancey (politician) =

American politician

Member of the New York Provincial Assembly

Personal details
- Born: 1732 New York City, Province of New York, British America
- Died: April 8, 1800 (aged 67–68) Bath, England, United Kingdom
- Spouses: Mary Livingston (died 1770) Margaret Allen (after 1771)
- Relations: Stephen De Lancey (grandfather)
- Parent(s): James De Lancey; Anne Heathcote
- Education: Eton College
- Alma mater: Corpus Christi College, Cambridge

James De Lancey Jr. (1732 – April 8, 1800) was a colonial politician, turfman, and the son of Lieutenant Governor James De Lancey and Anne Heathcote.

== Early life ==
Coat of Arms of James de Lancy

He was born in 1732 in New York City in a house built by his grandfather, Stephen De Lancey. This house later became famous and known as Fraunces Tavern. He had two sisters, Martha and Susan De Lancey.

James was sent abroad for his education, first to Eton, and, in 1750, to his father's college, Corpus Christi College, Cambridge.

== Career ==
Following the footsteps of his father, he was admitted to Lincoln's Inn in 1753, where he pursued his studies in law in company with other wealthy provincials who found this method of legal education more attractive than a pedestrian apprenticeship to a colonial attorney at home. However, he never practiced law.

=== French and Indian War ===
The French and Indian War broke out immediately upon his return to America, so upon leaving the university he entered the army, reaching the rank of captain. He is said to have served aide to James Abercrombie in the Lake George campaign of 1758 and was involved in the capture of Fort Niagara in 1759. His military activities ended with the death of his father. The news of his father's death on July 30, 1760, reached him after he had left Oswego in the vanguard of the army headed for Crown Point. This left James with the responsibilities of the headship of one of the wealthiest and most powerful families of the provincial aristocracy. De Lancey was, with the possible exception of Frederick Philipse, the wealthiest man in the Province of New York, and for a number of years devoted himself to increasing his landed properties.

During his young manhood in England, he acquired the sporting tastes of the period. After obtaining his great property he imported what are said to have been the first English race-horses, or thoroughbreds ever brought to New York. After a few years he assembled the largest and most select stud and stable of running horses in the colony if not the whole country. He was said to have been the "Father of the New York Turf." His chief opponent in racing and politics was Lewis Morris Jr., who was later a signer of the Declaration of Independence.

=== Political career ===
His responsibilities as head of the family comprehended not only the development of the extensive De Lancey estates and the conduct of the family mercantile business, but also the continuation of the political influence of the De Lancey interest. At first, the political fortunes of the De Lancey family suffered a decline under James Jr., who lacked his father's dominant official position and his powerful influence in London. At the Assembly elections in 1761, the Livingstons triumphed, but only temporarily, for in the decade following James De Lancey skillfully strengthened his own influence and that of his party.

=== The De Lancey political faction ===
Although a leader of the court party, James De Lancey won favor with the general public by his opposition to the Stamp Act, but he was opposed to the use of mob violence to protest British measures and alarmed at the increasing activity of the unenfranchised. Apparently, De Lancey's position at the time of the Stamp Act left him in good standing with the masses. The De Lancey party won the city delegation to the Assembly in 1768, James receiving the second highest number of votes of the group, which defeated the Whig lawyer combination. The De Lancey's preferred the more conservative, traditional methods of opposition to the British Law: non-importation and a boycott of violators of the non-importation agreement. The De Lancey's thus sided with the prevailing merchant desire to keep the artisans from developing the clout they had wielded in the Stamp Act crisis.

However, in October 1769 De Lancey's faction came under attack from the artisan community. The De Lanceys' support declined even more when the De Lancey-controlled Assembly passed a special tax to raise funds to implement the Quartering Act. The De Lanceys were aware that by passing the tax they would probably lose their earlier artisan support, but trade had declined to an alarming point and there was little available currency. James De Lancey was a member of the New York committee of correspondence, which in 1774 sent a letter to Edmund Burke protesting against the acts of the British government. De Lancey acknowledged the authority of the acts of Parliament not contrary to the rights of Englishmen, but he denied the right to tax without consent.

=== Flight to England ===
As late as April 1, 1775, he was put on a committee to correspond with other colonies, but by this time the masses had little confidence in the De Lancey controlled Assembly. Realizing that his influence in the province had been virtually destroyed, he left the colony in April of that year, following the Battle of Lexington; journeying via Fort Stanwix to Canada, he sailed for England in May 1775.

Until the evacuation of the city, he could still live in comfort from the rents his Lower East Side tenants continued to pay. De Lancey took steps at once to realize as much money as he could from his holdings while the British still held New York. In 1780, he appointed his brother-in-law and his attorneys to sell his New York holdings. From the year of the passage of the Act of Attainder, De Lancey's income, now greatly curtailed, was supplemented by a grant of £200 a year from the British Treasury. Of total claims for compensation amounting to £56,781, De Lancey was finally paid £29,842, second only to Frederick Philipse in awards made to New Yorkers.

De Lancey's impressive social connections stamped him as a natural leader of the Loyalist cause in England. Throughout his later days, De Lancey continued to frequent the highest social circles abroad. As late as 1791, James Rivington addressed him "at Lord Southampton's, Westminster".

== Personal life ==
On August 19, 1771, De Lancey was married to Margaret Allen, daughter of Chief Justice Allen of Pennsylvania. Together, they were the parents of five children who survived him:

- Charles Stephen De Lancey (d. 1840), who served in the Royal Navy.
- Margaret De Lancey, who in 1794 married Sir Juckes Granville Juckes-Clifton (1769–1852), the High Sheriff of Montgomeryshire.
- Ann De Lancey, who never married.
- Susan De Lancey (d. 1866), who never married.
- James De Lancey (d. 1857), a Lieutenant-Colonel in the First Dragoon Guards.

None of the five had children. There are speculations with supporting evidence of tombstone inscriptions that De Lancey had a previous union with a connection of the Livingston family. Only her Christian name, Mary, is known. She died in 1770 leaving three children: John, James, and Mary. Through funds believed to have been indirectly provided by De Lancey from his London exile, these children were reared and educated.

De Lancey's death at Bath, England, is recorded in The Gentleman's Magazine for April 8, 1800.

=== The De Lancey Estates ===
James De Lancey built himself a mansion north of Broadway and Thames Street, a large brick edifice with a semicircular driveway leading through a row of magnificent shade trees, an outstanding feature of his extensive estate. The house fronted the Bowery and stood near the present site of Christie Street between De Lancey and Rivington Streets. The interior of the house compared in lavishness of appointment with the residences of wealthy Londoners of the day and the more costly Williamsburg, Virginia mansions. To the rear, the house looked out upon a formal garden—a showplace of the town. The East and West De Lancey Farms ran from the Bowery, facing the Bayard Estates, to the East River and from Division Street north to Stanton Street, where they bordered the lands of Pierre Van Cortlandt, Peter Stuyvesant, and Messrs Bayard, Watts, and Rutgers. When, in 1765 his sister Ann married the judge and Loyalist historian, Thomas Jones, James De Lancey gave them a two-acre estate known as "Mount Pitt", at the highest part of Grand Street. The rentals from this lower East Side property made up the chief part of De Lancey's income, which he invested in the acquisition of numerous other parcels of real estate.

Fifteen years of accumulation added to his holdings a thirty-acre farm at Bloomingdale, running from the southern boundary of Central Park to the North River. With his boyhood friend James Duane, he was one of the Socialborough Proprietors, holding an area obtained by grant in 1771 and located on both sides of Otter Creek in the present towns of Pittsford and Rutland, Vermont.

He had large holdings in the Minisink Patent, a grant so worded as to extend far into New Jersey, and considerable acreage in Northampton County, Pennsylvania. He also had extensive properties in the Cherry Valley area and at other points in Albany County, notably Canajoharie and Hosack, and in Tryon County, including Mohawk Valley lands. Some of these he conveyed to his brother-in-law, John Watts, in 1765. The estate of James De Lancey is often regarded as a classic illustration of the democratic effects of the Revolution, as his East Side property alone was repurchased from the Commissioners by some 275 owners.

=== De Lancey Horse-racing ===
On First Street stood De Lancey's stables, on Second Street a paddock for the horses, and nearby a private track to train them. From Wildair, Lath, and Cub Mare, imported by De Lancey, were descended most of the great race horses of America prior to the Civil War. De Lancey was not content with entering his racers at the local tracks—at the Church Farm, or the Newmarket on Hempstead Plain, and at Harlem—although in these local contests he faced stiff competition from Lewis Morris. In 1769 his horse Lath came in the winner of the £100 purse at the Center Course at Philadelphia, and on another occasion, in a race in Maryland, he lost a half-bushel of silver dollars when a horse bearing the Dulany colors came in ahead of his entry. It is significant that one of the earliest resolves of the Continental Congress was one urging that, in view of the approaching conflict, horse-racing be discontinued. When De Lancey left America in 1775 he sold out his entire stable.

Ancestors of James De Lancey

16. Pierre de Lancey, Seigneur de Niville
8. Jacques de Lancy
4. Stephen Delancey
9. Marguerite Bertrand
2. James De Lancey
20. Captain Olof Stevense Van Cortlandt
10. Stephanus Van Cortlandt
21. Annetje "Anna" Loockermans
5. Anne van Cortlandt
22. Colonel Philip Pieterse Schuyler
11. Gertrude Schuyler
23. Margaretta Van Slichtenhorst
1. James De Lancey
24. Gilbert Heathcote, Mayor of Chesterfield
12. Gilbert Heathcote
25. Elizabeth Outram
6. Caleb Heathcote
26. Gerorge Dickens
13. Ann Dickons
3. Anne Heathcote
28. John Smith
14. Colonel William "Tangier" Smith
29. Mary
7. Martha Smith
30. Henry Tunstall
15. Martha Tunstall
31. Elizabeth Hutchinson
