= Stephen Delancey =

French-born American businessman & politician (1663-1741)

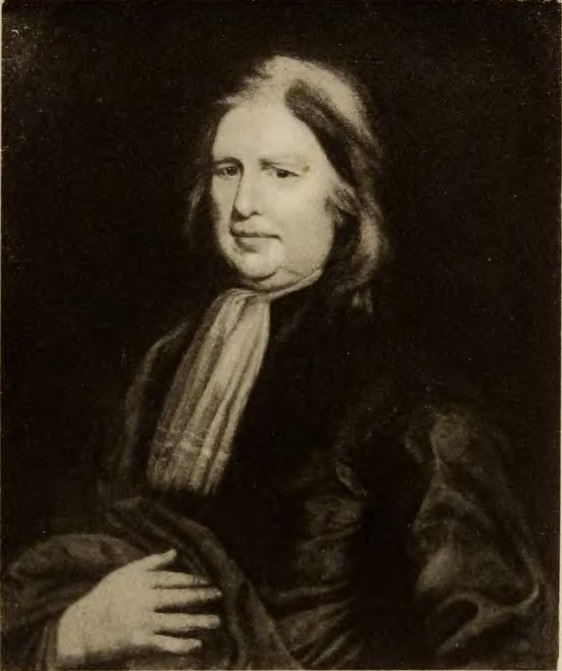
- Born: Étienne de Lancy; October 24, 1663; Caen, France
- Died: November 18, 1741 (aged 78); New York City, Province of New York, British America
- Spouse: Anne van Cortlandt (m. 1700; died 1724)
- Children: 10, including James, Oliver
- Relatives: Oliver De Lancey (son); James De Lancey (grandson); Stephen Delancey (grandson); Oliver De Lancey (grandson); John Watts (grandson); Alice De Lancey Izard (granddaughter); Peter Warren (son-in-law)

Stephen Delancey (born Étienne de Lancy; October 24, 1663 – November 18, 1741) was a French-born American merchant and politician in colonial New York who served as a member of the New York General Assembly and the Executive Council. His children, including James De Lancey and Oliver DeLancey, continued to wield great influence until the American Revolution.

== Early life ==
Delancey was born in Caen, France, on October 24, 1663 as Étienne de Lancy, the only son of Jacques de Lancy, Esq. and Marguerite Bertrand. His great-grandfather was Jacques de Lancy, a crown prosecutor, and his great-great grandfather was Charles de Lancy, 5th Viscount of Laval and Nouvion.

=== Ancestors ===
Coat of Arms of Stephen (Étienne) de Lancy

Coat of arms of the House of de Lancy

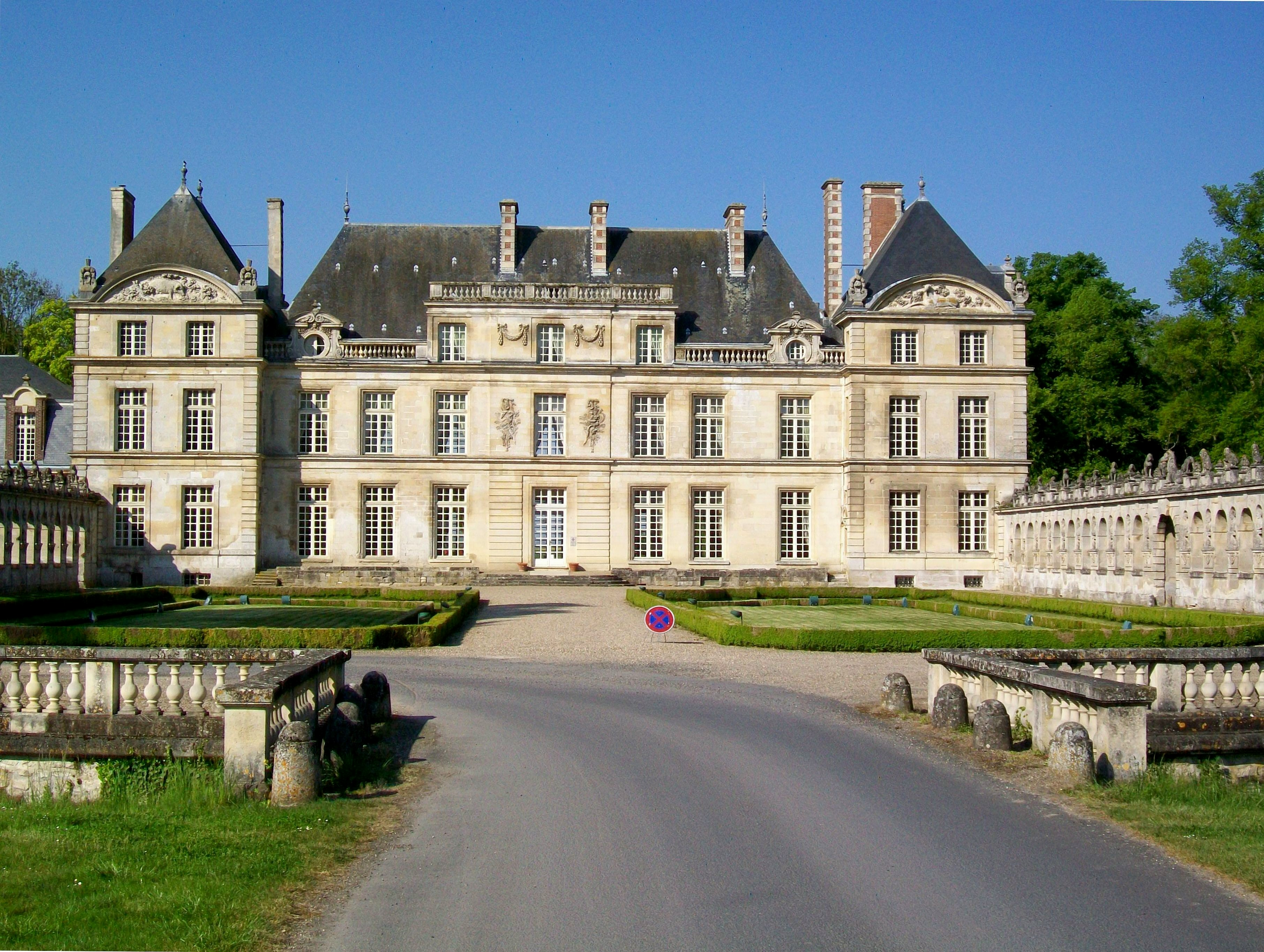
The castle of Raray in Picardy

The de Lancy family were minor French nobility (fr: la noblesse française) and, despite being of the Huguenot faith, served the French Crown as administrators and bureaucrats for over two hundred years. Dating back to the early 15th century, successive generations of the de Lancy family (or de Lanci in older texts) held the titles of Viscount of Laval and of Nouvion, Baron of Raray, Lord of Nery and of Faverolles, Verines, Ribecourt and Haramont. (Vicomte de Laval et de Nouvion, Baron de Raray, et Seigneur de Néry et de Faverolles, Vérines, Ribécourt, et Haramont) The family coat of arms is blazoned: Or an Eagle Sable displayed beaked and membered Gules, overall an escutcheon Azure in pale three spears erect Or. (Armes : d'or à l'aigle de sable becqué et membré de gueules chargé en coeur d'un écusson d'azur surchargé de trois lances d'or posées en pal.)

Jacques De Lancy, was descended from Guy de Lancy (d. 1436), the 1st Viscount of Laval and of Nouvion, which was created in 1432 during the reign of Henry VI. Guy was succeeded in 1436 by his son, Jean de Lancy, 2nd Viscount. He was succeeded by his son, Jean de Lancy, 3rd Viscount (born 1470), who was succeeded by his son, Charles de Lancy, 4th Viscount in 1525. Ten years later, in 1535, Charles was succeeded by Charles de Lancy, 5th Viscount of Laval, who was the eldest of his two sons from his second marriage to Marie de Villiers. On April 15, 1534, Charles, the 5th Viscount, married Isabeau Branche, daughter of Fourcy Branche, Lord of Bréau, with whom he had three sons: Charles de Lancy, Jacques de Lancy, and Claude de Lancy. The second son, Jacques, crown prosecutor in the provost, had a son Pierre de Lancy, Lord of Niville. His son, Jacques de Lancy, was Étienne de Lancy's father.

Around 1600, the land of Raray was sold to Nicolas de Lancy, advisor to the King, war treasurer, Chamberlain of Gaston, Duke of Orléans. He built of the present castle of Raray along with the two outer buildings. In 1945, Raray Castle was the filming location for scenes from the film Beauty and the Beast by Jean Cocteau. In 1654, de Lacey was created Marquis de Néry-Raray by Louis XIV, a title which is currently held by the Marquis de la Bédoyère who married into the family.

== Fleeing from France ==
In 1686, de Lancy was forced to flee bitter persecution by French Catholics following the October 18, 1685 revocation of the Edict of Nantes by Louis XIV, in which some two hundred thousand Huguenots left their native land. Escaping first to Rotterdam with a portion of the family jewels which his mother had given him sewn into his clothing, de Lancy sailed to England, obtaining an "Act of Denization" (naturalization) from King James II on March 3, 1686.

=== Life in New York ===
Soon afterwards, de Lancy sailed for the English Colonies in America, landing in New York City on June 6, 1686. Almost exactly one month later (July 7), he obtained additional letters of denization in New York from Governor Dongan, and on September 9, 1687, took the Oath of Allegiance to the British Crown under the Colonial Act of 1683. It was at this time that he anglicized his name, becoming Stephen Delancey. He sold his portion of the family jewels for £300 (equivalent to £62,098 in 2025) and became a merchant.

Delancey was to become one of the most successful merchants in the colony of New York with his well-known granary, warehouse and retail store, known to all as "Delancey and Co." During Queen Anne's War, letters of marque against the French served as a cover for DeLancey to engage in trade as an interloper with Red Sea Pirates of Île Sainte-Marie. This also entailed his engagement in the trade in enslaved Malagasy people. By the 1730s, he had become such a prosperous merchant that he was able to build a large mansion on Broadway, just above Trinity Church. The mansion was eventually demolished in 1792 to build the City Hotel, and the site is now occupied by the United States Realty Building. Stephen Delancey played an active role in the life of the city, serving as an Alderman for several years, and both a member of the New York General Assembly and the Executive Council. He is also credited with having presented as gifts to the city its first Town Clock and its first Fire Engine.

== Family ==
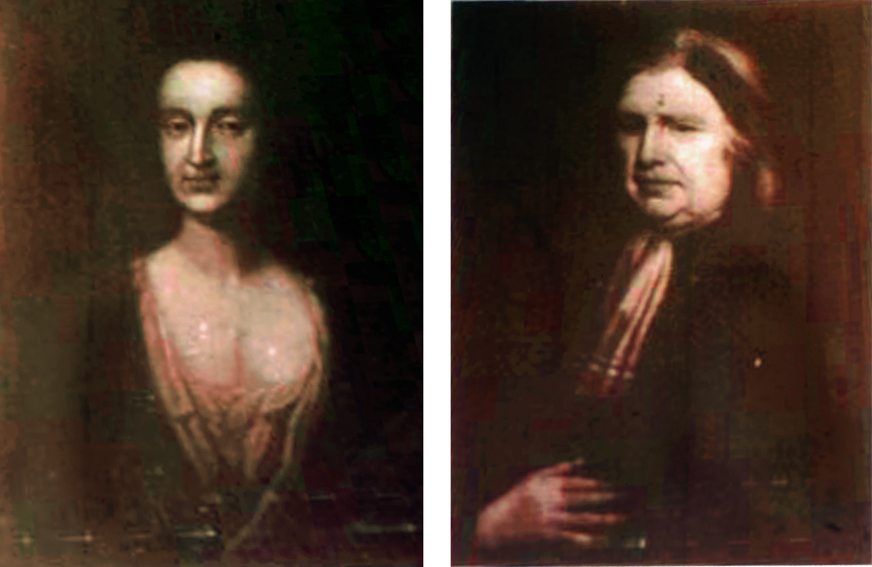
Stephen Delancey and his wife, Anne van Cortlandt

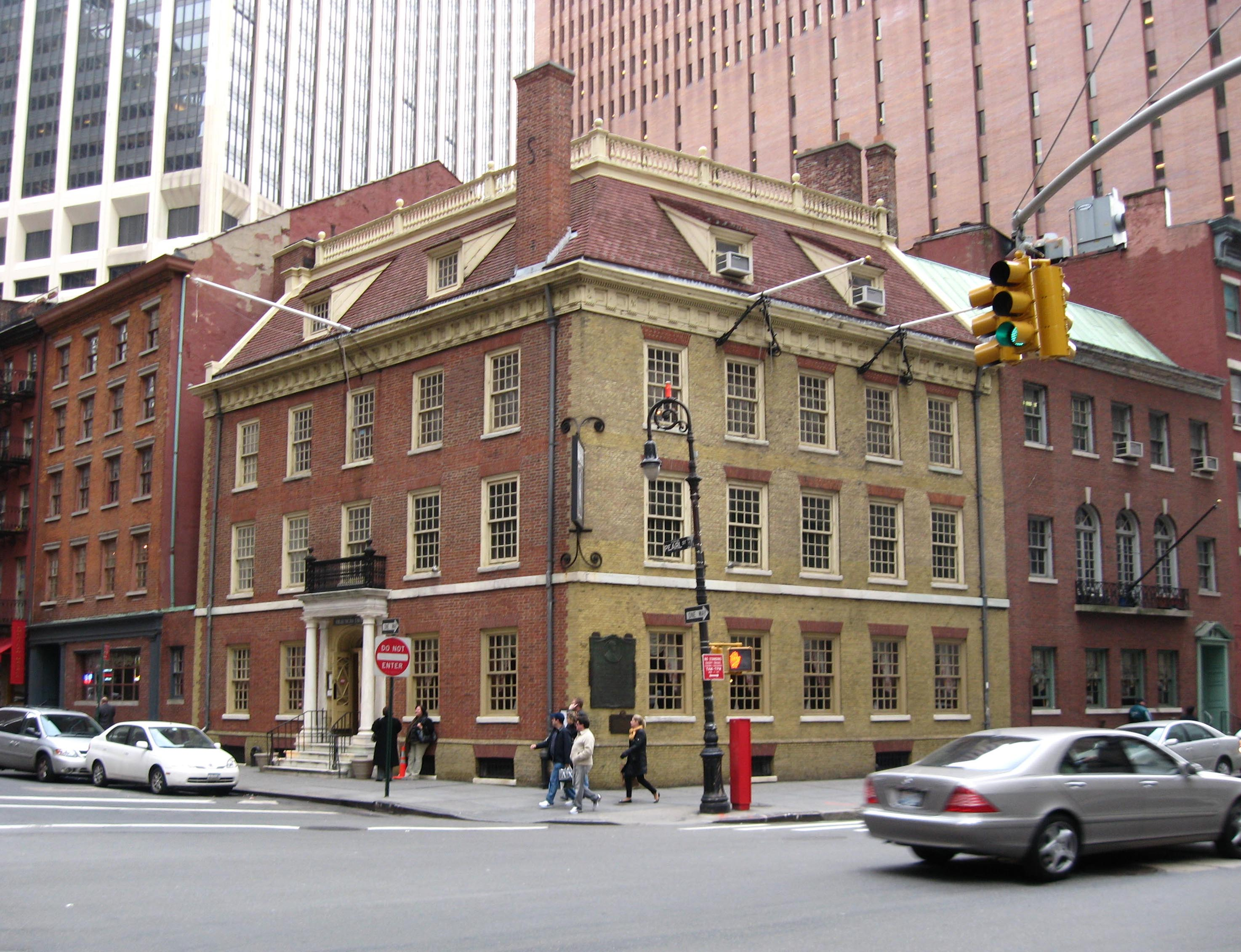
Delancey's home at 54 Pearl Street

On January 23, 1700, Delancey married Anne van Cortlandt (1676–1724), third child of Gertrude Schuyler (born 1654) and Stephanus van Cortlandt (1643–1700), the Chief Justice of the Province of New York. They had ten children, only five of whom survived infancy, all of whom married and had issue. They were:

- James DeLancey (1703–1760), who married Anne Heathcote, daughter of Caleb Heathcote, and who became Chief Justice of the Supreme Court for the Province of New York, in addition to serving as Lt. Gov. of New York.
- Peter DeLancey (1705–1770), who married Elizabeth Colden, daughter of Cadwallader Colden and became a merchant in what is now the Bronx, and served in the New York Provincial Assembly for many years.
- Susannah DeLancey (1707–1771), who married Admiral Sir Peter Warren (1703–1752), who was an MP for Westminster.
- Oliver DeLancey (1718–1785), who married Phila Franks and who also became a merchant, serving as a brigadier general in the British Army during the American Revolution
- Anne DeLancey (1723–1784), who married John Watts (1715–1789), a prominent businessman of the day.

In the summer of 1700, Delancey began construction of a house at 54 Pearl Street in New York City, on land given to his wife by her father as a wedding gift to the young couple. In 1762, the house was sold at auction by Stephen's heirs to Samuel Fraunces, who converted it into the Queen Charlotte Tavern. The house still stands today, and is known as Fraunces Tavern.

At the time of his death on November 18, 1741, de Lancey left an estate valued in excess of £100,000 British Pounds (approximately $18,000,000 in US dollars today).

=== Descendants ===
Through his eldest surviving son James, he was the grandfather of James De Lancey (1732–1800), a colonial politician and turfman, and Anna De Lancey (1746–1817), who married a Recorder of New York City, Thomas Jones.

Through his son Peter, he was the grandfather of Susan DeLancey (1754–1837), who married Thomas Henry Barclay, a lawyer who became one of the United Empire Loyalists in Nova Scotia and served in the colony's government. His other granddaughter Jane (1750–1809) married John Watts, her first cousin. The sisters married in a double-wedding ceremony.

Through his son Oliver, he was the grandfather of Stephen Delancey (1748–1798), who served as Chief Justice of the Bahamas and Governor of Tobago and was the progenitor of the Bahamian branch of the De Lancy family; Oliver De Lancey (c. 1749–1822), a British Army officer who served as a Member of Parliament for Maidstone from 1796 to 1802; and Susanna De Lancey who married Sir William Draper, a British military officer who conquered Manila in 1762.

Through his daughter Anne, he was the grandfather of John Watts (1749–1836), a lawyer and politician from New York City who represented New York in the U.S. House of Representatives.
