= Magdalene De Lancey =

Scottish memoirist (1793–1822)

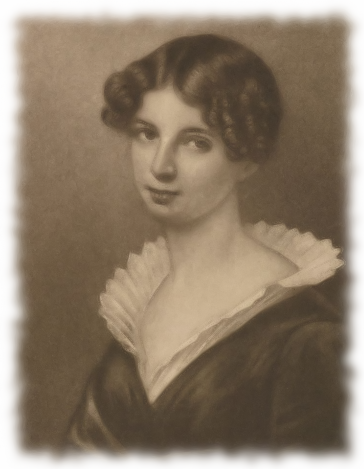
Magdalene De Lancey from a miniature after J. D. Engleheart

Magdalene, Lady De Lancey (née Hall; 22 March 1793 – 12 July 1822) was a Scottish memoirist who wrote A Week in Waterloo, her account of the days surrounding the Battle of Waterloo, during which her husband Colonel Sir William Howe De Lancey died of his wounds.

== Early life ==
Magdalene was born in East Lothian, Scotland on 22 March 1793. She was the fourth of six children of Sir James Hall of Dunglass, 4th Baronet (1761 -1832) and Lady Helen Douglas (1762-1837), a daughter of Dunbar Douglas, 4th Earl of Selkirk. Magdalene was baptised at Oldhamstocks, East Lothian. Her father was a geologist, inventor and President of the Royal Society of Edinburgh.

Her brother Basil Hall was a noted traveller and author. He rose to post-captain in the Royal Navy and while a lieutenant on HMS Endymion (1797), a ship sent to Portugal at the time of the battle of Corunna, he met and became friendly with William Howe De Lancey, who was then serving in the army with Sir John Moore. On their return, Basil introduced William to his family.

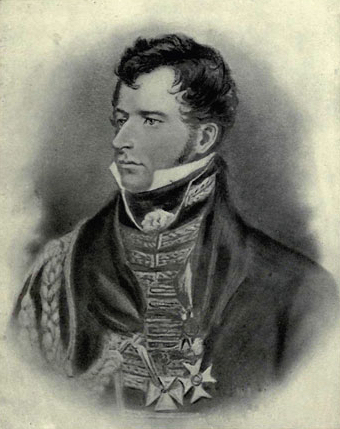
Willian Howe De Lancey

In 1814 William was posted to Scotland and married Magdalene in Edinburgh on 4 April 1815. Their honeymoon would be cut short by the escape of Napoleon from Elba. Soon after, her husband was summoned to London and then ordered to Brussels.

== Waterloo ==
Her husband was appointed deputy quartermaster-general in the Duke of Wellington's army. On 8 June 1815, Magdalene and her husband arrived in Brussels where they were billeted in the house of the Comte de Lannoy at the Impasse du Parc. They expected to "remain quietly there for a month at least" and agreed that "upon the commencement of hostilities [Magdalene] should go to Antwerp, and there remain till the end of the campaign." She witnessed the flurry of activity as an aide de camp arrived in Brussels on 15 June and her husband galloping to the Duke of Wellington's house where he found the Duke "standing looking over a map with a Prussian general, who was in full-dress uniform—with orders and crosses, etc.—the Duke was in his chemise and slippers, preparing to dress for the Duchess of Richmond's ball."

She continues, "The reveille was sounded all night, and the troops actively prepared for their march. I stood with my husband at a window of the house, which overlooked a gate of the city, and saw the whole army go out. Regiment after regiment passed through and melted away in the mist of the morning. At length my husband was summoned." At six in the morning on Friday 16 June she relocated to Antwerp "to avoid the alarms that [Sir William] knew would seize everyone the moment the troops were gone" but also so that if the battle was lost, she could return to England. She writes about the confusion and rumours in Antwerp and hearing the noise of the cannon, which shook the house.

On the battlefield, at about 3 P.M. on Sunday 18 June, when talking to the Duke of Wellington, a cannonball struck William and he fell to the ground. Wounded, he was moved to a cottage. Magdalene learned on Monday morning that he was alive; a few hours later that he was wounded. The route to find her husband was "entangled in a crowd of wagons, carts, horses, wounded men, deserters or runaways, and all the rabble and confusion, the consequence of several battles". Encountering Mr. William Hay of Duns Castle, she was told William had died, but the following morning she was told his wounds were being attended by surgeons. A carriage took her to Brussels and then it took three hours to cover the nine miles from Brussels to the cottage where William was lying at Mont St. Jean.

The road to Nivelles fronted the cottage, "and every waggon going to and from the army, and all the wounded and prisoners, passed along that road."

She nursed William for six days, rarely sleeping, tearing her petticoat to provide dressings, applying leeches to his wounds and "sat down to watch the melancholy progress of the water in his chest, which I saw would soon be fatal". His funeral took place on 28 June. On 4 July, 3 months after her wedding, Magdalene visited her husband's grave and then departed for England.

=== A Week in Waterloo ===
At her brother's request, Magdalene wrote a serial narrative account of her, "A Week in Waterloo", in June 1815. Her brother lent the narrative to Sir Walter Scott, Charles Dickens and others. A condensed account was found amongst the papers of her nephew, General De Lancey Lowe, after his death in 1880. His widow published it in 1888. Her account was published in full with an explanatory preface in 1906.

Sir Walter Scott wrote on 13 October 1825 that he considered the narrative "as one of the most valuable and important documents which could be published all illustrative of the woes of war ... I never read anything which affected my own feelings more strongly."

Charles Dickens wrote on 16 March 1841 " ...To say that the reading that most astonishing and tremendous account has constituted an epoch in my life—that I shall never forget the lightest word of it—that I cannot throw the impression aside, and never saw anything so real, so touching, and so actually present before my eyes, is nothing. I am husband and wife, dead man and living woman, Emma and General Dundas, doctor and bedstead—everything and everybody (but the Prussian officer—damn him) all in one."

== Later life ==
In 1817 at Dunglass House, Magdalene de Lancey married Captain Henry Harvey, Madras infantry, who retired in 1821. She died on 12 July 1822 at Sidmouth while giving birth to her third child, aged 29. She was interred in Salcombe Regis in Devon on 19 July 1822.

== Cultural references ==
"Her description of the battle and surrounding areas is said to have contributed to WM Thackeray's seminal Brussels scene in Vanity Fair."

Thomas Moore, who was lent a copy by Magdalene's brother, wrote I "took the narrative to bed with me to read a page or two, but found it so deeply interesting, that I read till near two o'clock, and finished it; made myself quite miserable, and went to sleep, I believe, crying.

Earl Stanhope wrote: "I mentioned with much praise Lady De Lancey's narrative of her husband's lingering death and of her own trials and sufferings after Waterloo. The Duke told me that he had seen it—Lord Bathurst having lent it him many years ago." This conversation took place on 12 October 1839.

In the 1970 film Waterloo, directed by Sergey Bondarchuk, Veronica De Laurentils played Magdalene Hall.

== References and external links ==
- A Week at Waterloo at Project Gutenberg
- The manuscript can be viewed as part of the National Army Museum Online Collection
- A Week at Waterloo, Lady Magdalene De Lancey - webpage at Waterloo200.org
- Waterloo Day: Even the horses were screaming. Daily Telegraph
- Reminiscences, by Samuel Rogers, under the heading: "Duke of Wellington,"
- Memoirs, Journal, and Correspondence of Thomas Moore, edited by Lord John Russell, Journal of 29 August 1824, vol. iv., p. 240.
- Notes of Conversations with the Duke of Wellington, by Earl Stanhope, p. 182.
