= Lancey =

Lancey is a surname. Notable people with the surname include:

- De Lancey Nicoll (1854–1931), New York County District Attorney
- James De Lancey (loyalist) (1746–1804), political figure in Nova Scotia
- Oliver DeLancey (disambiguation) (also known as Oliver DeLancey and Oliver de Lancey) may refer to:
  - Oliver De Lancey (American loyalist) (1718–1785), merchant, a New York Loyalist politician and Major-general during the American War of Independence
  - Oliver De Lancey (British Army general) (1749–1822), British Army officer who took served in the American War of Independence and the French Revolutionary Wars
  - Oliver De Lancey (British Army and Spanish Legion officer) (1803–1837), British Army officer who volunteered for the Spanish Legion and died fighting in Spain during the First Carlist War
- Stephen De Lancey (1738–1809), lawyer and political figure in New York state and Nova Scotia
- William Howe De Lancey, (1778–1815), British Army officer of the Napoleonic Era, died of wounds received at the Battle of Waterloo

== See also ==
- La Combe-de-Lancey
- Lance
- De Lancie (disambiguation)
- Delancey (disambiguation)

Media related to Lancey at Wikimedia Commons
