= Battle of Oriamendi =

Battle of the First Carlist War

Coordinates: 43.2667°N 1.9667°W

- Part of First Carlist War
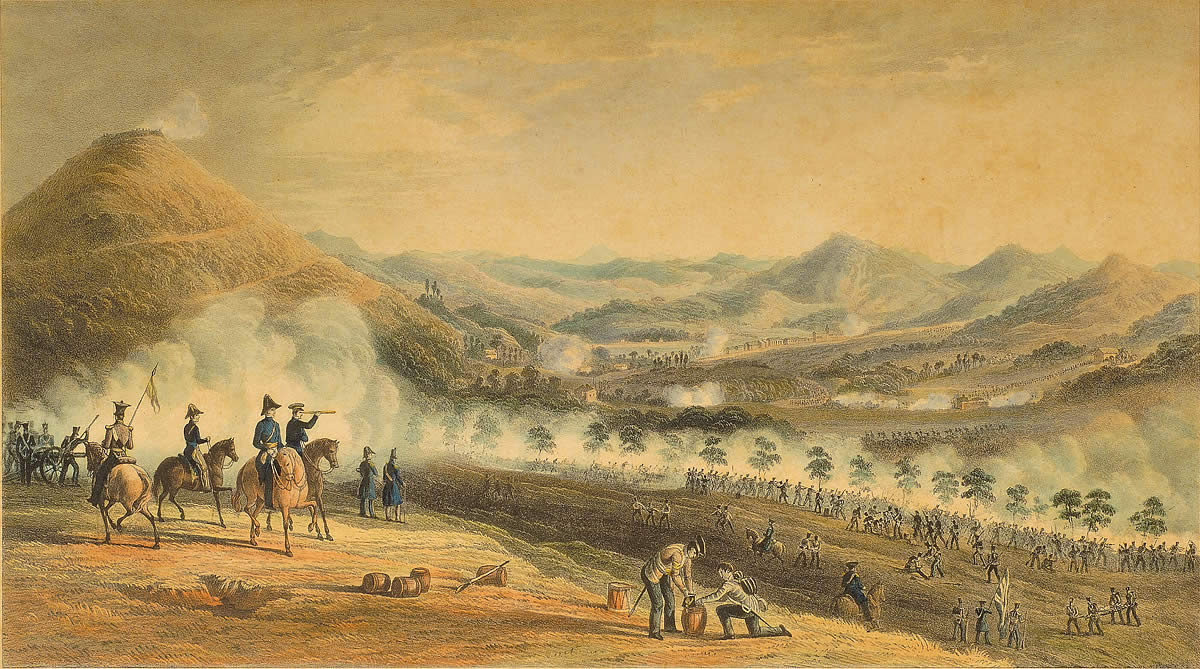
- View of the Hernani from the Venta de Oriamendi plateau. The Carlists are attacking the position defended by General Evans, on 16 March 1837, and the last position of the soldiers of the British Auxiliary Legion.
Date	16 March 1837
Location	Oriamendi hill, south of San Sebastián, Basque Country, Spain
Result	Carlist victory

Belligerents
Carlists	Liberal Christinos; British Auxiliary Legion

Commanders and leaders
Sebastian de Borbón	Baldomero Espartero; Pedro Sarsfield; (United Kingdom) De Lacy Evans; (United Kingdom) Oliver De Lacey †

Strength
	9,300 (½ Spanish)

Casualties and losses
	~1,000–1,500 killed, wounded, captured or missing

The Battle of Oriamendi (Basque: Oriamendiko Gudua) was fought on 16 March 1837, during the First Carlist War, a civil war in Spain from 1833 to 1840, the first of the three Carlist Wars, fought between two factions over the succession to the throne and the nature of the Spanish monarchy. The battle was an overwhelming victory for the Carlist faction.

== Prelude ==
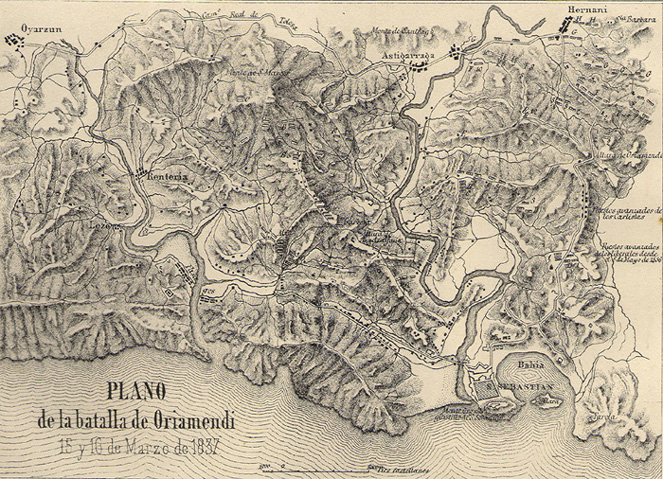
Plan of the battle of Oriamendi

The battle was part of a campaign in spring 1837 when the liberal army, the supporters of the claim of Isabel II tried to chase the Carlists out from the Basque Country.

Liberals' General Pedro Sarsfield, marching from Pamplona, was supposed to threaten the Lecumferri pass, while General Espartero was to advance from Bilbao with the purpose of distracting the Carlists. It was planned that the combined British-Spanish force, starting at San Sebastián, led by George de Lacy Evans would attack the Carlist-held town of Hernani. This concentric attack was planned by General Sarsfield with the goal of annihilating Carlist forces.

== Battle ==
On 15 March 1837, the British Auxiliary Legion attacked and overtook the fortification known as Oriamendi, on a strategic hill near San Sebastián, defended by Carlist Guipuzcoans.

The next day, the Carlists, under Sebastian de Borbón, counterattacked and routed the liberal forces, who were supported by the British Legion, both of which suffered heavy losses of between 1,000 and 1,500 casualties, while only covering fire from Royal Navy ships prevented their withdrawal from becoming a disastrous rout. After their defeat, the British/liberal army retreated to their trenches outside San Sebastian.

The success of the Carlist troops laid in their defence-in-depth tactic and their infantry's higher mobility.

== Aftermath ==
After the battle, the Carlists tightened their grip around San Sebastián, but never succeeded in taking the city.

The defeat caused an outrage at the British parliament. The battle was a significant boost for Carlist morale, and is commemorated in the "Marcha de Oriamendi," which became the anthem of the Carlist movement.

== See also ==
- Battle of Andoain
- Oliver de Lancey
- Maurice O'Connell

== Sources ==
- Alison, Archibald (1871). "XXXV – Spain, from the Death of Zumalacarregui in 1835, to the termination of the Carlist War in 1840.". History of Europe 1815-1852. Vol. 5. William Blackwood and Sons.
- Coverdale, John F. (2014). The Basque Phase of Spain's First Carlist War. Princeton Legacy Library. Princeton University Press. ISBN 9780691612096.
- de la Cuesta, Julio Albi (7 May 2017). "Carlistas contra británicos. La batalla de Oriamendi" [Carlists against the British. The battle of Oriamendi] (in Spanish).
- Esposito, Gabriele (2017). Armies of the First Carlist War 1833–39. Bloomsbury Publishing. ISBN 9781472825247.
- Jaques, Tony (2007). Dictionary of Battles and Sieges: F-O. Greenwood Press. ISBN 9780313335389.
- Thieblin, Nicolas Leon (1874). Spain and the Spaniards. Hurst and Blackett.
- Thomas, Neil (2012). "8 – The Battle of Oriamendi (16 March 1837)". Wargaming: Nineteenth Century Europe, 1815–1878. Casemate Publishers. ISBN 9781781594063.
