= Delancey =

Delancey may refer to:

- Delancey (company), British property firm
- Delancey (surname), a surname
- Delancey Street, a street in Manhattan, New York
- Delancey Street, Camden, a street in Camden Town, London
- Delancey Place, a street in Philadelphia, Pennsylvania
- Crossing Delancey, a 1988 film

== See also ==
- De Lancie (disambiguation)
