= Battle of Aranzueque =

Battle of the First Carlist War on 19 September 1837

- Part of First Carlist War
Date	19 September 1837
Location	Aranzueque, province of Guadalajara, Spain 40°29′36″N 3°04′36″W
Result	Liberal victory

Belligerents
Carlists supporting Infante Carlos of Spain	Liberals (Isabelinos or Cristinos) supporting Isabella II of Spain and her regent mother Maria Christina

Commanders and leaders
	Baldomero Espartero
- Location within Spain

The Battle of Aranzueque was a military confrontation at the village of Aranzueque, Spain, on 19 September 1837, during the First Carlist War.

The battle pitted the troops of the pretender to the Spanish crown, Carlos V, against the troops of the Queen Regent Maria Christina, led by the general Baldomero Espartero.

The loyalist troops had attacked the Carlists at Alcalá de Henares and pushed them through Alcarria towards Aranzueque. On September 19, the loyalists pressed a final attack upon the tired and depleted Carlists at Aranzueque. Espartero succeeded in taking the village, with the artillery bombardment causing the full rout of the Carlists. This victory for the loyalists definitively ended the Carlist campaign known as the Expedición Real.
