= Louis Gardent =

French cyclist (1878–1917)

Personal information
- Born: 18 August 1878 Auris, France
- Died: 10 December 1917 (aged 39) Saint-Égrève, Isère, France
- Height: 1.56 m (5 ft 1 in)

Cycling career
- Sport: Cycling
- Discipline: Road
- Role: Rider

Professional teams
- 1907: Alcyon
- 1908-1909: Salomon

Louis Gardent (18 August 1878 – 10 December 1917) was a French road cyclist.

Gardent had not an easy childhood and adolescence, but nevertheless he went on to participate in major cycling events. He participated in three editions of the Tour de France, in the 1907 edition, 1908 edition and 1909 edition, finishing the 1909 edition in 40th place. He died during World War I in 1917.

== Biography ==
=== Early life ===
Louis Gardent was born on 18 August 1878 at Les Prénards in Auris, in Oisans, the fifth of eleven children, nine of whom survived. Like his brothers and sisters, he attended school during the winter. In spring, the boys were placed with local families to tend livestock or assist with agricultural work.

Gardent later worked at the papermills of Lancey. He used what little leisure time he had to train, cycling with friends on the steep roads of the region. According to an account of his training, he would sometimes buy a bundle of wood at the top of the Laffrey climb and attach it to the back of his bicycle with a rope, using it as a brake during the dangerous and dusty descent.

He subsequently moved to the Paris region, where he worked in printing. In letters to his brothers, he advised them and helped them find employment, and he also provided particular assistance to his parents.

=== Cycling career ===
Gardent participated in the 1907 Tour de France, riding for the Alcyon team and being listed 38th among 109 entrants. In 1908 and 1909 Gardent was sponsored by Salomon and was listed to live in Grenoble. He participated in the 1908 Tour de France as an independent rider. He joined the new formed organization of Marcel Dozol that helped independent riders during the Tour. He was listed 90th among 162 entrants, of whom 115 started. He reached the eighth stage after crossing several of the race's major climbs, including the Ballon d'Alsace, Côte de Cerdon, Col de la Porte, Côte de Laffrey and Col Bayard. In the eighth stage, from Nîmes to Toulouse, a distance of 303 km, he was eliminated after several punctures and a crash because he finished outside the time limit.

In 1909, Gardent also took part in the 1909 Tour de France. He left Paris on 5 July and finished in Paris on 1 August. The race consisted of 14 stages, with the longest covering 424 km and was the longest Tour de France in history. There were 193 entrants, 156 starters and 55 riders who reached the finish. Gardent competed as an individual rider and finished 40th overall.

=== Military service and death ===
Gardent was mobilized in 1914, as were four of his brothers. He served in the 340th Infantry Regiment and died on 10 December 1917 at the Saint-Robert psychiatric asylum in Saint-Égrève, Isère, from general debility following an illness that had been aggravated during his military service. He died one year after his brother Marius, who was killed in the Ardennes on 20 June 1916.
