= Lord Elliott =

Lord Elliott may refer to:

- Archie Elliott, Lord Elliott (1922–2008), Scottish judge
- Tom Elliott, Baron Elliott of Ballinamallard (born 1963), Ulster Unionist Party politician
- Matthew Elliott, Baron Elliott of Mickle Fell (born 1978), British Conservative political strategist
- William Elliott, Baron Elliott of Morpeth (1920–2011), British Conservative politician

== See also ==
- Baron Eliot, a subsidiary title of the Earl of St Germans
- Lord Eliot Convention, an 1835 agreement in the First Carlist War
- Baroness Elliott (disambiguation)
- Edward Eliot, 3rd Earl of St Germans (1798–1877)
