= Baroness Elliott =

Baroness Elliott or Baroness Elliot may refer to:

- Katharine Elliot, Baroness Elliot of Harwood (1903–1994), British public servant
- Julie Elliott, Baroness Elliott of Whitburn Bay (born 1963), British Labour Party politician

== See also ==
- Lord Elliott (disambiguation)
