= Carlist Wars =

Series of civil wars in 19th-century Spain

The Carlist Wars (Spanish: guerras carlistas, Basque: karlistadak, Catalan: guerres carlines) were a series of civil wars that took place in Spain during the 19th century. The contenders fought over claims to the throne, although some political differences also existed. Several times during the period from 1833 to 1876 the Carlists—followers of Don Carlos (1788–1855), an infante, and of his descendants—rallied to the cry of "God, Country, and King" and fought for the cause of Spanish tradition (Legitimism and Catholicism) against liberalism, and later the republicanism of the Spanish governments of the day. The Carlist Wars had a strong regional component (Basque region, Catalonia, etc.), given that the new order called into question region-specific law arrangements and customs kept for centuries.

While some historians count three wars, other authors and popular usage refer to the existence of two major engagements, the First (1833–1840) and the Second (1872–1876) Carlist Wars, treating the 1846–1849 events as a minor episode.

== Background ==
In the decades prior to the French Revolution and Napoleonic Wars, the Spanish crown had repeatedly tried to reassert the control over the periphery and tried to clamp down on the autonomies. Napoleon's invasion of Spain also brought with itself increased government intervention and centralization efforts.

When King Ferdinand VII of Spain died in 1833, his widow, Queen Maria Cristina, became regent on behalf of their two-year-old daughter Queen Isabella II. The country splintered into two factions known as the Cristinos (or Isabelinos) and the Carlists. The Cristinos supported Queen Maria Cristina and her government, and were the party of the Liberals. The Carlists advocated for Infante Carlos of Spain, Count of Molina, a pretender to the throne and brother of the deceased Ferdinand VII. Carlos denied the validity of the Pragmatic Sanction of 1830 that abolished the semi Salic Law (he was born before 1830). The Carlists wanted a return to autocratic monarchy.

The Carlists were primarily composed of rural and traditionalist elements, and were more successful initially due to their use of guerrilla warfare tactics. However, they were ultimately defeated by the liberal forces led by General Baldomero Espartero.

== First Carlist War ==
First Carlist War (1833–1840) lasted more than seven years and the fighting spanned most of the country at one time or another, although the main conflict centered on the Carlist homelands of the Basque Country and Aragon, Catalonia and Valencia. The war was fought between the supporters of two factions: liberals, who wanted to create a centralised constitutional monarchy who supported the regent, Maria Christina and her daughter Isabella II of Spain, and conservatives from the non-Castilian Catalonia and Basque country, who wanted to stop the liberal reforms and centralizations efforts, headed by Carlos de Borbón, the brother of the late Spanish king.

The war is considered one of the bloodiest in Spanish history and more than 120,000 or 5% of the pre-war Spanish population dying as the result of it.

== Second Carlist War ==
Second Carlist War (1846–1849) was a minor Catalan uprising. The rebels tried to install Carlos, Count of Montemolín on the throne. Initially the war started with the small scale uprisings, and guerilla attacks all around Catalonia. In Galicia, a smaller-scale uprising also started but was quickly put down by General Ramón María Narváez.

At the same time when the revolts started, the French detained Don Carlos, so he was unable to join the uprising, which ultimately doomed the Carlist war effort, and resulted in their defeat.

== Third Carlist War ==
Third Carlist War (1872–1876) began in the aftermath of the deposition of one ruling monarch and the abdication of another. Queen Isabella II was overthrown by a conspiracy of liberal generals in 1868, and left Spain in some disgrace. The Cortes (Parliament) replaced her with Amadeo, the Duke of Aosta (and second son of King Victor Emmanuel II of Italy). Then, when the Spanish elections of 1872 resulted in government violence against Carlist candidates and a swing away from Carlism, the Carlist pretender, Carlos VII, decided that only force of arms could win him the throne. Thus the Third Carlist War began; it lasted for four years, until 1876, when he was defeated and Alfonso XII was installed as a new King of Spain.

== Aftermath and legacy ==
The Carlist Wars had a significant impact on the development of Spain during the 19th century. This period has been characterised by serious instability and political turmoil, that slowed down the economic development and diminished the international status of Spain. Though Carlist violence was unable to stop or reverse the liberal reforms, they nonetheless managed to slow down their implementation, so even in the early 20th century Spain was not completely centralized despite the government's efforts.

The Carlist Wars also laid down a foundation for many future internal conflicts that had occurred in Spain, as the tensions that initially caused the Carlist Wars were never completely resolved and even magnified due to the rise of nationalism and economic hardships that Spain had to undergo in the early 20th century.

== See also ==
- The two Spains – Phrase about the political division of Spain up to the Spanish Civil War
- War of the Aggrieved
- Spanish Civil War
