= Delancey (surname) =

Delancey (also De Lancey and de Lancey) is a surname. Notable people with the name include:

- James De Lancey, British colonial Governor of New York between 1753 and 1760
- James De Lancey (disambiguation), other people of that name
- Oliver De Lancey (disambiguation), multiple people
- Etienne de Lancey (1663-1741), a French nobleman
- William Howe De Lancey (1778-1815), Wellington's Chief of Staff at the Battle of Waterloo.
- DeLancey W. Gill (1859–1940), American photographer
- Scott DeLancey (born 1949), American linguist
