= Royal Expedition =

1837 operation of the First Carlist War in Spain

- Part of First Carlist War
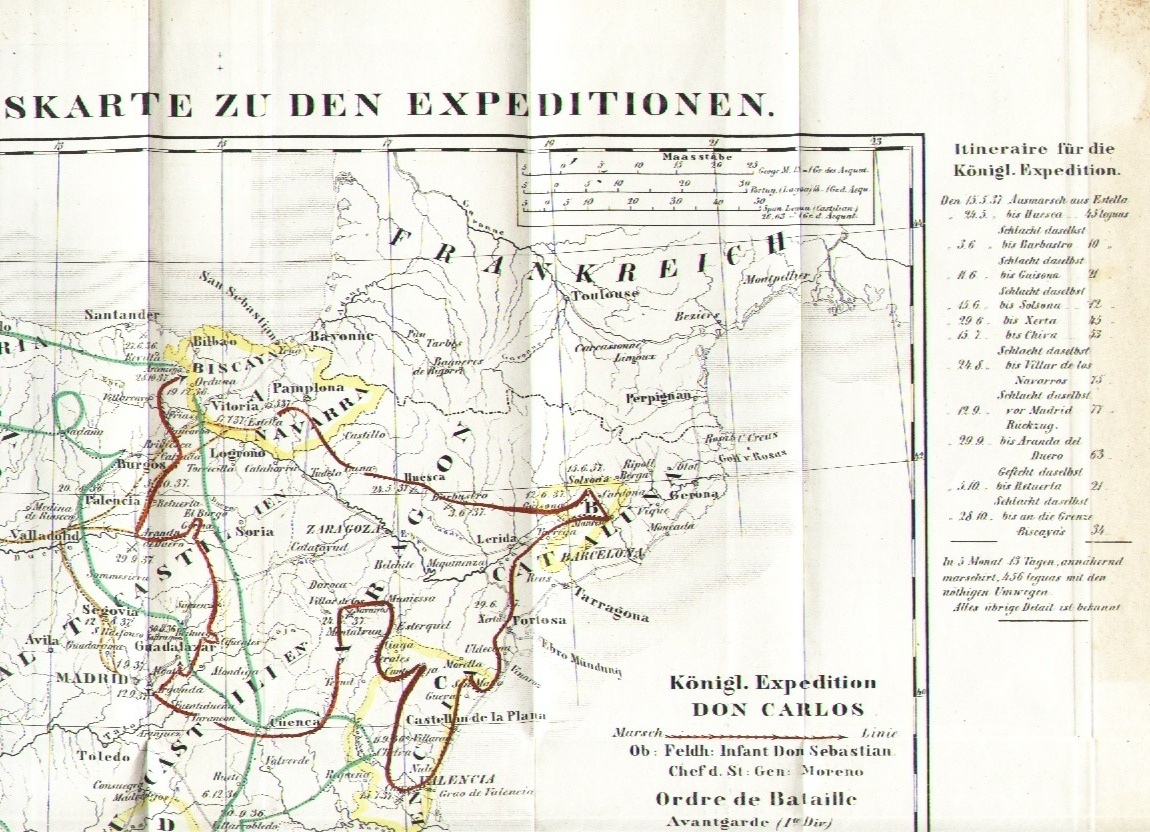
- Contemporary map showing the path of the Expedition
- Operational scope: Strategical
- Commanded by: Don Carlos, Infante Sebastian, Vicente González Moreno
- Objective: Control of Madrid and land south of the Ebro river
- Date: 15 May 1837 – 4 October 1837
- Outcome: See Aftermath

The Royal Expedition (Spanish: Expedición Real), also known as Don Carlos' Expedition, was an 1837 operation in the late stages of the First Carlist War undertaken by the Carlist insurgents. Marking the highest point of Carlist control, it ended with a humiliating defeat and laid the groundwork for the end of the war in 1839.

== Background ==
On 15 May, the Carlists launched from their capital in Estella-Lizarra what was termed the Royal Expedition: a massive raid on Madrid. There were multiple causes for this, both diplomatic and economic. By then, both the Basque region and the Maestrazgo had been strained after years of militarization and living in a war economy, which forced the Carlists to resort once again to the raids that had characterized the first years of fighting.Due to the Basque blockade, Carlists had difficulties paying soldiers and had faced mutinies in March. Advisors told the pretender that the Basque army could only sustain 15 more days of operations. In addition, Klemens von Metternich told the Carlists that the Austrians would stop financial support if the insurgents could not establish themselves past the Ebro, while the French suggested that they'd back them if they were able to take control of the Franco-Spanish border. Similarly, the "northern powers" of Europe had informed Carlos they would recognize him if he sent an official decree from Madrid. Finally, Maria Cristina was rumored to be willing to strike a peace involving her exile and marriage of her daughter to a Carlist prince, an agreement that would necessitate Carlos renouncing his claim in favor of his son. A letter she sent to him also asked for all of those who had fought on her side to be pardoned if included in a list she would compile herself.

A Carlist officer later recounted in his memoirs that the insurgents were confident in the possible success of the raid on Madrid due to a recent victory in Aguirre, the size of Baldomero Espartero's Maestrazgo army, and doubts regarding other strategies being planned combined with the desires of many in the Carlist ranks of a large attack on the seat of the Crown.

== Expedition ==
At the start of the expedition, the Carlists had no artillery with them and had to wait until they marched for some days to get artillery units when joining up with other Carlist forces. A large group of priests and administrative officials, expecting to take up roles as part of the Royal Court once Madrid was taken, accompanied the Carlist army and put a heavy pressure on their logistics and especially their lodgings. The Cristino army was debilitated by this point by a year of mutinies. Furthermore, the Cristinos territories had been the source of widespread anti-clericalism, with over 400 parishes closing in the first half of 1836 due to lack of ministers, giving the Carlist troops a religious fervor that increased their morale.

Both the expedition and a 12,000-strong contingent of the Cristino National Militia and the Army of the North under Espartero met at the Battle of Huesca on 25 May. A victory for the Carlists in which they killed or captured over a thousand Cristinos allowed them to then occupy the city. Three days later the Carlists took Barbastro without fighting. All throughout, underfed Carlist soldiers "resorted to routine excesses against the villages". On 2 June, the Cristinos attacked the town in the Battle of Barbastro, where they were once again defeated. The Carlists defeated the equally sized army of 12,400 infantry and 1,400 cavalry and artillery under the command of General "Grey Fox" Oraá, though "vastly" outnumbered in artillery. As it had been throughout the war, their superior knowledge of terrain proved a dominant advantage.

The British ambassador to the Cristino court outlined the Carlist strategy in Aragon as follows: "The same as in Navarra: to deceive the Queen’s generals by false information, and to harass the troops by constant marches and counter-marches and then to beat them in detail". This was additionally effective by the revolutionary crisis the Cristinos faced, as instead of being able to field significant troop numbers to fight against Carlist raids they instead kept them in population centers to prevent radical citizens from rebelling.

The Carlists crossed the Ebro on 29 June, linking up with Cabrera's forces at Xerta and preventing a Cristino counter-insurgency in Catalonia. The only places Carlists were unable to take control of were major towns and the coastline. The Carlists were now beginning to strain their supply lines and their armies grew exhausted from marching. On 15 July, they suffered their first defeat of the expedition at the Battle of Chiva, where the bulk of the Carlist forces were almost routed by a smaller Cristino force. This forced the expedition to retreat northwards, with villages on the path being then raided by both sides. On 24 August, while retreating, the Carlists managed to defeat the equally sized Cristinos at the Battle of Villar de los Navarros, taking prisoners and badly needed supplies.

At the same time as the expedition was underway, the Carlist launched another raid from the Navarre under the leadership of Juan Antonio de Zaratiegui. While originally intended as a diversion, they made such rapid progress through exposed and badly defended Cristino territory that they conquered Segovia early in August. Thus, both expeditions were closing in on Madrid at approximately the same time. The Cristino frontline "appeared to be evaporating across Castille", leading to panic in the capital. In response, on 6 August the Liberals declared Madrid in a state of siege decreeing a wide range of pro-Carlist activities as punishable by council of war. The Cristinos offered token resistance as they surrendered the towns and cities surrounding Madrid in order to regroup their forces. In Valladolid, for example, the double-administration common throughout the war allowed for a peaceful taking of the city as the Cristino leaders resigning to Madrid and pro-Carlists taking their place in a "gentlemanly manner". This calm transition spared the city from the pillaging and other atrocities exemplified by other frontline cities, until a later Cristino counter-attack forced Zaratiegui to abandon the city and join the Royal Expedition in its south. Meanwhile, politically charged mutinies started to occur within the Cristino ranks outside Madrid, which were not punished by their officers as the indiscipline was much less threatening than the Carlist raid.

On 10 September, the Carlists had reached the walls of Madrid while a possible diplomatic solution was rumoured. Some members of the Madrid community called for siege warfare preparations. However, all this proved unnecessary as Espartero's Army of the North was able to force the Carlist vanguard to retreat via a show-of-strength march as the march made Carlos fear the worst. The Carlists retreated to Alcalá de Henares and then again farther back, removing any threat from Madrid and outraging some of their troops. The retreat greatly spurred Cristino morale, and the Carlists suffered a string of rear-guard defeats as they retreated, having lost all momentum they gained in the months prior. They lost increasing numbers of weapons and manpower to desertions and the prestige they had cultivated in the villages they conquered was "shattered". Carlos attempted to convince Cabrera to replace Moreno as Commander-in-chief, but he refused "in thinly-veiled disgust at the failure of the king's leadership". Cabrera had supported a very fast raid on Madrid to last two weeks rather than the leisurely "throne-and-altar" march that the Carlists had undertaken under the command of Infante Sebastian and Carlos. The foreign auxiliaries like Von Rahden were also angry: they "did not understand the decorative time-wasting of the Carlist political community" which had wasted many opportunities for decisive victories with "masses and festivals of grace".

The retreat to the Basque Country was ruthless, with Carlists that fell out from fatigue would be shot by their own army in order to discourage desertions. Espartero was equally harsh in his treatment of the civilian populations of Castille. Many of them had defected to the Carlists during the Expedition, and were now facing the situation common in areas that had been in the frontline during the war. Large food shortages, double administrations, and armies that repressed the towns they crossed. Such was the situation that Espartero promised a death penalty to those that were found hoarding food and drink. His soldiers did not fare much better, even if they now had the advantage, with the clothing of his army in a bad state (shoes, for example, would sometimes have cardboard heels that would break apart within weeks). On 4 October, the Cristinos won a close Battle of Retuerta by using the last of their reserves, thereby pushing the Carlists back to the other side of the Ebro and signaling the end of the Royal Expedition.

The villagers on the Carlists' path feared the pursuing Cristinos more than the fleeing insurgents and so refused to make shoes or equipment for them. Thus, they were forced to pillage and steal, and thus Villiers reported that "every village through which the [Cristino] army has passed has been found barefooted". However, the Liberals were also in a dire logistical situation as their system (based on private contractors) was often intercepted by Carlists and consequently were only able to supply less food and clothing that was needed by Espartero's army.

== Aftermath of the Royal Expedition ==
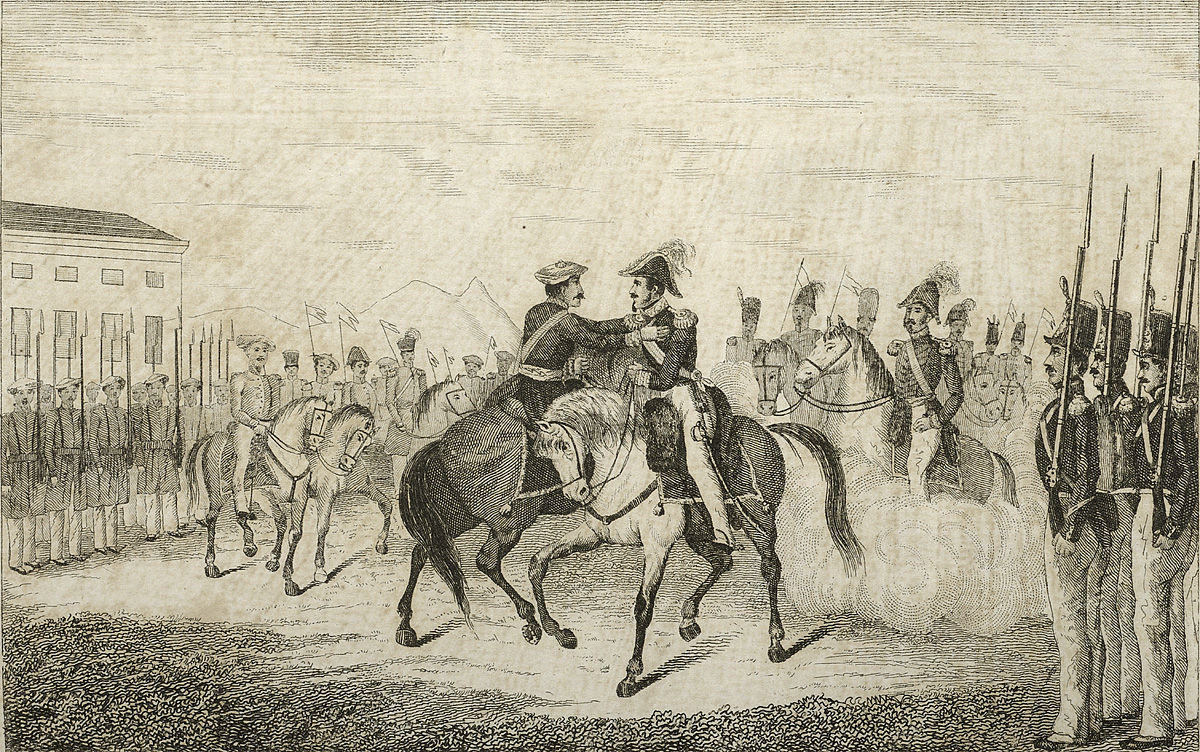
The Embrace of Bergara put an end to the First Carlist War in the Basque Country (1839)

The expedition showed that the Carlists were too weak to decisively carry out military operations deep within Cristino territory and were only effective within areas already strongly under their control. Their failure to take the Capital resulted in significantly reduced international support and on 23 October the Manifesto of Arceniega led the path to purges. In a proclamation made at this town, the insurgent king Carlos said that the Expedition had been just a "promising dress rehearsal", back-tracking on claims that the previous march on Madrid would be the "definitive" end of the war, for a future offensive of "national liberation". Radical members of a political ideology called apostolicism (a branch of Spanish absolutism) started to dominate the Carlist court, "launch[ing] public proclamations describing the Expedition’s failure as the work of [a] hated peace faction". Moderates were removed from cabinet positions leading to leaders such as Teijeiro and Guergué to take over. These new cabinet members antagonized the army, especially the Commander-in-chief Rafael Maroto, resulting in deep division within the Carlist ranks.

Additionally, as most of the successes during the raid came from Cabrera's efforts in the Maestrazgo, the Expedition consolidated his leadership in the region. He gained veto powers on all matters, both political and military. Furthermore, the strong propaganda created from the local victories led to a growing enlistment of conscripts into the Carlist army in this region. As the Northern front stalled, the focus of the Carlist efforts thus shifted towards the Eastern regions commanded by Cabrera.

Carlist territory under Cabrera reached its peak expansion in 1838. He escalated reprisals against prisoners in a "villainous war to the death" and refused to expand the provisions of the Eliot Treaty to his territory. He took Morella on 25 January and turned it into his de facto capital. He began turning into a military dictator, over-ruling the Carlist junta and the Church's privileges. He began smelting church bells into weapons and demoted the Carlist Bishop of Mondoñedo after he complained to Carlos of Cabrera's expulsion of friars from Morella for refusing to take up weapons in its defense during a siege. In June he sent out envoys to Livorno to seek foreign support for a new operation in Catalunya but these were intercepted by British ships. In December a Carlist arms dealer was caught by the British seeking 15,000 firearms and consequently the British increased their efforts to intercept suspicious cargo on the Spanish Eastern coast, reducing the Carlist supply of weapons.

On 31 August 1839, the Basque provinces agreed to conditional surrender in the Convention of Vergara, freeing Espartero's army to use its full strength on the Maestrazgo. Cabrera's territory fell into a "reign of terror" and he fell gravely ill in February 1840. By his recovery in May most of the east had been lost to the Cristinos, and in June he went into exile to France. Thus, the First Carlist War was over.
