= Oliver De Lancey (British Army and Auxiliary Legion officer) =

Oliver De Lancey (1803–1837) was a British Army officer who volunteered for the British Auxiliary Legion and died fighting in Spain during the First Carlist War, in the battle of Oriamendi.

== Biography ==
Oliver De Lancey was the only son of General Oliver De Lancey (1749–1822), and was born in Guernsey in 1803. He was the grandson of American Loyalist Oliver De Lancey, a member of a prominent Huguenot family in the American Colonies and a descendant of the Schuyler family and Van Cortlandt family, and Phila Franks, daughter of a prominent Jewish family in New York.

De Lancey entered the army as a second lieutenant in the 60th Rifles on 30 March 1818, and joined the 3rd battalion of the regiment in India in the same year. He was promoted first lieutenant on 17 June 1821, and after serving as aide-de-camp to Lieutenant-general Sir Charles Colville, G.C.B., commander-in-chief at Bombay, was promoted captain on 7 August 1829, and joined the 3rd battalion at Gibraltar, where he learnt Spanish and took a keen interest in Spanish politics and in the crisis that was rapidly approaching. His battalion returned to England in 1832, but De Lancey still kept up his interest in Spain, and was one of the first English officers who volunteered to join the Spanish legion which was being raised to serve under the command of Major-general Sir De Lacy Evans, K.C.B., against the Carlists in the First Carlist War.

De Lancey sailed for Spain in 1835 with one of the first drafts from England, and on the way out showed his courage and presence of mind when his ship struck in a fog on the rocks off Ushant. On landing he was placed at the head of a regiment of the legion, and, after serving as acting adjutant-general at the action of Hernani, accompanied Lieutenant-colonel Greville in command of the expedition to relieve Santander, which was then hard pressed by the Carlists. The expedition was completely successful, and De Lancey received the cross of San Fernando and was appointed deputy adjutant-general to the legion.

De Lancey distinguished himself throughout the defence of San Sebastian, and especially in the action of 1 October, and was sent on a delicate mission to Madrid, which he carried out to the satisfaction of his general. Not long after his return to San Sebastian the Carlists made a determined attack upon the government defences around the town, on 15 March 1837, which resulted in the rebel victory of Oriamendi. De Lancey was killed at the head of his regiment, just as his more famous cousin, Sir William Howe De Lancey, Wellington's quartermaster-general, was fatally wounded at Waterloo. His tomb is on the fort at San Sebastian.
