= De Lancie =

de Lancie is a surname. Notable people with the name include:

- John de Lancie, character actor best known for his role as recurring guest star Q on the various Star Trek series
- John de Lancie (oboist), the principal oboist of the Philadelphia Orchestra for many years
- Keegan de Lancie, American actor and son of actor John de Lancie and Marnie Mosiman

== See also ==
- Lancié, French commune
- Delancey (surname)
