= Chapelgorris =

Volunteer unit during the First Carlist War

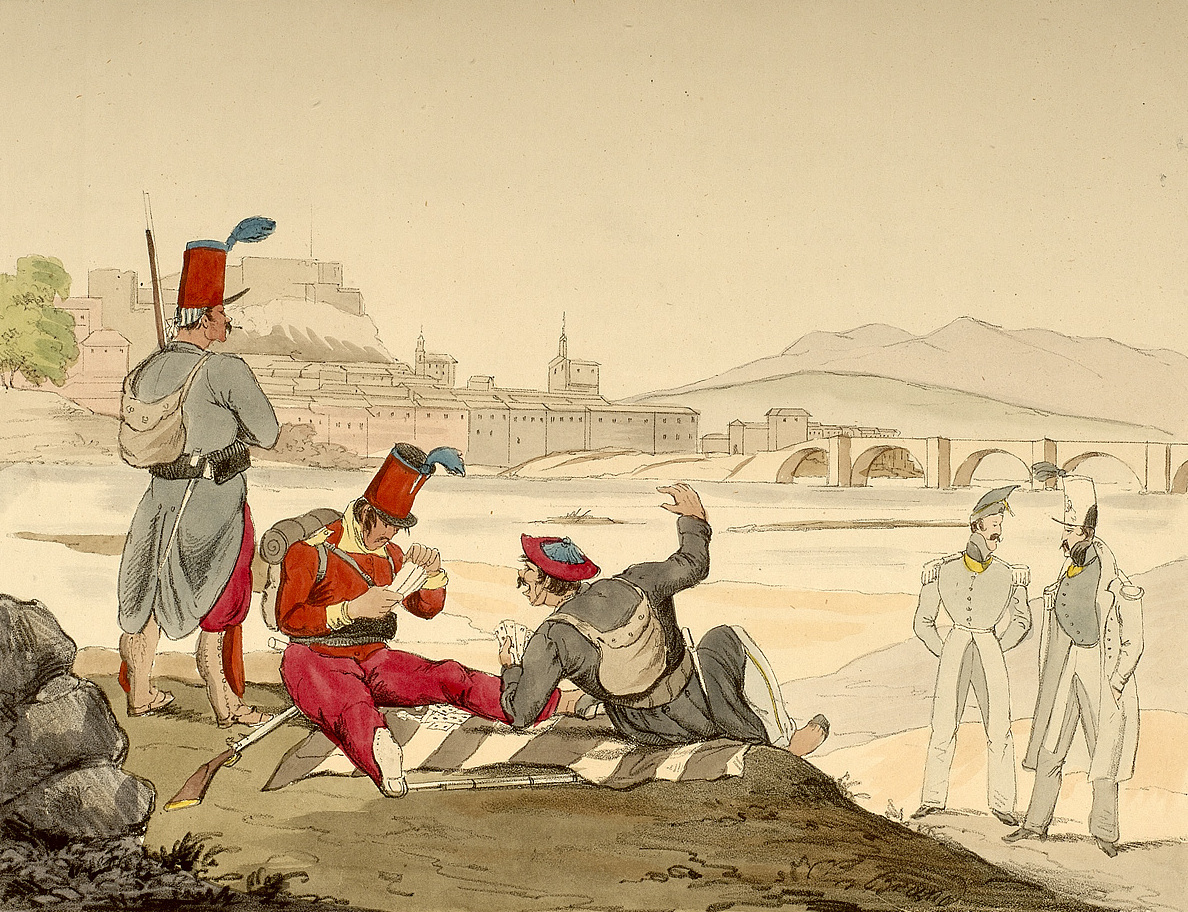
Chapelgorris at Miranda de Ebro

Chapelgorris (Spanish: [tʃapelˈɣoris]; Basque: txapelgorri, "Red Caps"), also called Peseteros, were a type of volunteer unit during the First Carlist War, raised at the beginning of the war in the province of Guipúzcoa. They fought against the Carlists.

A soldier of the British Legion called them a "half-wild soldiery" who "possess the same knowledge of the country, with the war-like habits and activity of the Carlists themselves, by whom they are held in considerable dread."

The Chapelgorris were formed in battalions of 700–800 men, and were officered mainly by Basques. At first irregular troops, they were later considered a regular corps.

They were called officially Free Troops (tropas francas) – for example, la Tropa franca de caballería de Ausejo (Free Troops of Cavalry of Ausejo) – but were disparagingly called Peseteros (which can be roughly translated as "money whores") by the Carlists, since they received one peseta per day, though this payment was not standard and varied in nature from province to province. When Baldomero Espartero received command of the Isabeline forces, he incorporated the Chapelgorris into his own troops; it is at that time that they received their red shakos.

They wore a long gray capote or cloak; a red cap or beret; a small canvas bag. For weapons they used a bandolier; a bayonet; and a carbine. While in full dress, they wore a high cylindrical red shako, as well as blue jackets embroidered with yellow lace and studded with silver bells and ornaments. However, after they became associated and attached with the British Legion, they adopted British uniforms, including the red coats of the British soldier. They are sometimes incorrectly called Carlist troops due to their red caps; however, the only Carlist troops who had permission to wear this was the battalion known as Guías de Navarra (Navarre Guides), an honor granted to them by Zumalacárregui.

An unflattering description of them states that:

They chose their own officers, owned by little obedience even to the generals, claimed the right of leading the advance, gave or took no quarter, and plundered unmercifully upon all occasions. These peculiar regulations, though rendering them terrible in war, were attended with certain inconveniences to the members of the corps. They were hunted like wild beasts by their enemies, often condemned and shot for mutiny by their own leaders, and stabbed in midnight brawls by one another.

A vivid description of a fight between a Carlist and a Chapelgorri survives: "They wrestled for a few moments, but the Chapelgorri was strongest and stabbed the Carlist, at the same time seizing the side of his face in his teeth, and tearing it like a wolf: even when he had torn one mouthful, and the Carlist still writhing, he bit again and shook the head of the vanquished foe till his own face was besmeared with blood.”

They participated in the First Battle of Arquijas (1834).

Chapelgorris and British troops captured by the Carlists were often tortured or immediately executed. In contrast, some Liberal troops of the line were saved by virtue of the Eliot treaty, which called for the exchange of prisoners rather than their immediate execution.

== See also ==
- Requetés - Carlist Red Berets
