= Lord Eliot Convention =

1835 treaty in the First Carlist War

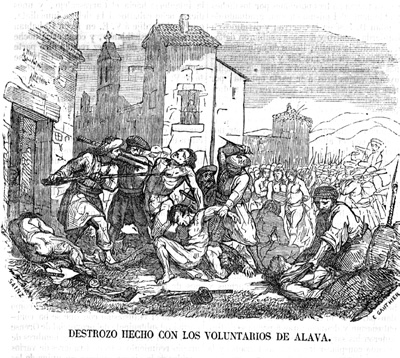
The Lord Eliot Convention sought to end indiscriminate executions by firing squad during the First Carlist War, such as those committed at Heredia, pictured here.

The Lord Eliot Convention, or simply the Eliot Convention or Eliot Treaty (Spanish: Convenio Lord Eliot), was an April 1835 agreement brokered by Edward Eliot, 3rd Earl of St Germans between the two opposing sides of Spain's First Carlist War. It had as its aim not to end the war itself but to end the indiscriminate executions of prisoners of war by firing squad that had been committed by both sides.

Edward Eliot had become Secretary of Legation at Madrid on 21 November 1821 and was styled Lord Eliot in 1826.

== Executions ==
During the First Carlist War, which began in 1833, Carlist prisoners who did not accept the Liberal Isabel II as their sovereign were executed by firing squad.

Early Isabeline executions include that of Santos Ladrón de Cegama on October 14, 1833 at Pamplona. On December 4, 1833, Vicente Genaro de Quesada, captain-general of Old Castile, executed five Carlists by firing squad at Burgos. The prisoners were given four hours to prepare for death, though the archbishop of Burgos requested, on December 6, 1833, that in future prisoners be given twenty-four hours to prepare for death. Quesada responded to this with: "...it would be pointless one way or another how much time we give before executing them" ("...será inútil la menor o mayor concesión de tiempo para ejecutarlos").

The Carlists inevitably reacted from their position of weakness by executing their prisoners in this way, not only as acts of reprisal but also due to limited facilities with which to house their prisoners. Not being able to take their prisoners with them on mountain campaigns, for example, the Carlists executed them before moving to a new location. Liberal soldiers found hiding in the aftermath of the Battle of Alegría de Álava (October 27, 1834), were not taken prisoner but shot or bayoneted on sight, and the Liberal commander during that battle, Manuel O'Doyle, was executed by firing squad on October 28, 1834.

A notorious incident was the execution of 118 Isabeline prisoners by the Carlists at Heredia (in Spain, called Fusilamientos de Heredia) by the order of Tomás de Zumalacárregui.

Espartero complained at Bilbao about the barbaric executions of the war, stating that it was prudent for the government to regulate the treatment of prisoners between the two opposing sides, in accordance with practices enacted between two opposing countries, "according to the general laws concerning the rights of men and of war."

== British intervention ==
The issue was discussed by the British government, which sent a commission to ensure that both sides reach an agreement to suppress indiscriminate executions, under Lord Eliot and Colonel John Gurwood. One historian has written that "the reciprocal massacre of prisoners had several times occurred, and the deadliest hatred and revenge was manifestly encouraged by both parties; in short, so savagely was the Spanish contest carried on, that the Duke of Wellington, from motives of humanity, sent Lord Eliot and Colonel Gurwood on a mission to Spain, to endeavour to put a stop to the cruelties practiced by the belligerents, and render the war less bloody and revengeful."

"They spoke perfect French and Spanish, and appeared to be admirably prepared for the job for which they were appointed, due to their conciliatory manner and their understanding of the country [i.e. Spain], which one man had acquired through the course of his diplomatic career, while the other through the course of his military career." Lord Eliot was described as "a person of graceful demeanor, of gentle and elegant proportions, thirty-four years old, and of modest dress, without any adornment. Colonel Gurwood accompanied him as secretary, and wore a uniform."

== Arrival of Lord Eliot and Gurwood at Spain ==
Lord Eliot arrived on April 5, 1835 at Bayonne, and got in touch with Francisco Espoz y Mina, commanding general of the Isabeline forces and based at Pamplona. Lord Eliot informed Espoz y Mina that he wished to communicate also with Don Carlos, and requested that Isabeline forces not stop him from doing so. Espoz y Mina had a British observer for the Isabeline army, a man named Wilde, escort Eliot and Gurwood across the border into Spain. On the way to escort the two men, Wilde met with Zumalacárregui and had dinner with the Carlist general on April 20, 1835 at Eulate. This gave Wilde an opportunity to tell Zumalacárregui about Eliot and Gurwood and their mission.

Eliot and Gurwood arrived at Segura on April 20, 1835 and met with Don Carlos. Don Carlos sent them to the quarters of Zumalacárregui, who would negotiate the convention. Eliot and Gurwood left Segura on April 23 and reached Alsasua; they were escorted by Colonel Serradilla.

== The agreement ==
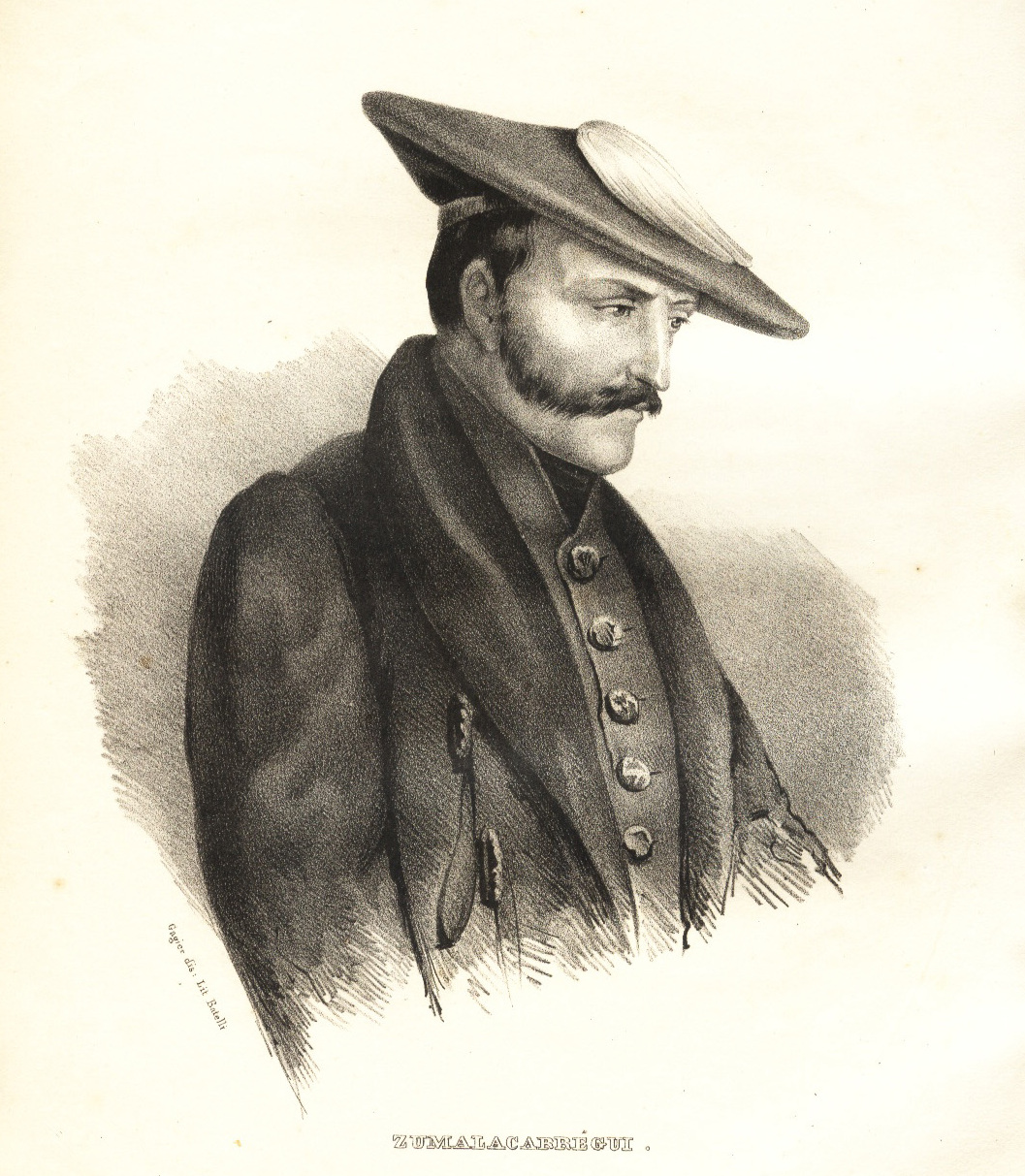
Tomás de Zumalacárregui

Meanwhile, the battle of Artaza (April 20–22, 1835) had resulted in the defeat of the Isabeline troops under Gerónimo Valdés, who took refuge at Estella.

Zumalacárregui stationed himself at the valley of Berrueza and met Lord Eliot there. Zumalacárregui agreed fairly quickly to the accord which he signed on April 24 at Asarta, thereby sparing the lives of 27 Isabeline prisoners who were about to be executed.

Lord Eliot wished to have an autograph of Zumalacárregui; the Carlist general, meanwhile, wrote that "at Asarta, located in the valley of Berrueza, celebrated for the various battles that have occurred there during this century, I had the honor to receive Lord Eliot on April 25, 1835, Lord Eliot - Tomás de Zumalacárregui." As a gift, Lord Eliot gave Zumalacárregui a telescope that Wellington had used during the War of Spanish Independence; the telescope is conserved today at the Museo Militar in Madrid.

The British commissioners traveled with Zumalacárregui from Asarta to Estella in search of the Isabeline general Gerónimo Valdés, in charge of the operations in the north of Spain after the resignation of Espoz y Mina, to sign the agreement. On the way there, they stopped at the Monastery of Irache; Zumalacárregui reported that at Irache "there were some very beautiful nuns who made an excellent chocolate."

Eliot did not find Valdés at Estella, but found him instead at Logroño. Valdés was not happy with the text that had been signed by Zumalacárregui, and made changes that he considered prudent. He signed the agreement at Logroño on April 27, 1835. A Carlist colonel who had accompanied the British commissioners to Logroño brought back the new text to Zumalacárregui, who signed the newly worded agreement on April 28, 1835 at Eulate.

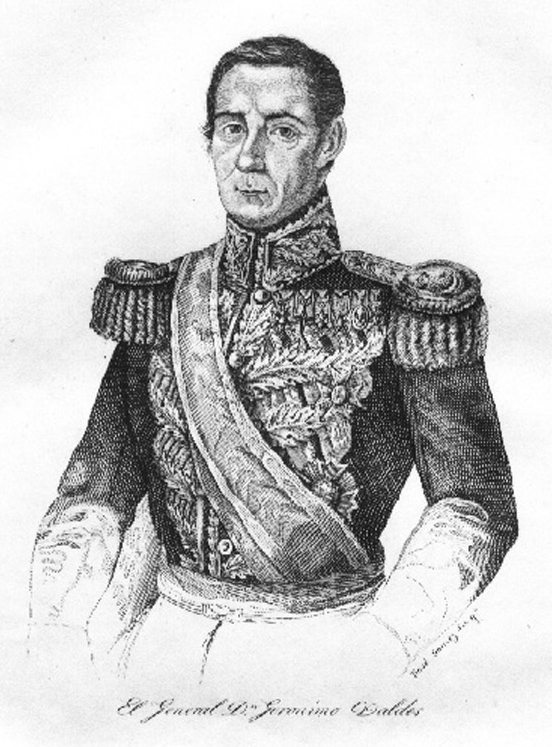
Jerónimo Valdés

The Convention contained the following nine stipulations:

- 1. Preservation of Lives of Prisoners
- 2. Periodical exchange of Prisoners
- 3. Number of Prisoners exchanged to be equal.
- 4. Exchange according to Rank
- 5. Towns selected for detention of Prisoners to be respected.
- 6. Political Prisoners to be tried in conformity with the Laws.
- 7. Sick and Wounded to be respected
- 8. Stipulations to be binding in all Provinces of the Monarchy.
- 9. Strict observance of Convention.

Article Six specifically stated:

During the present contest, no person, whoever he may be, civil or military, shall be deprived of life on account of his Political Opinions, without having been previously tried and condemned in conformity with the Laws, Decrees, and Ordinances in force in Spain. This is only to be understood in reference to those who are not in reality Prisoners of War; for as regards them, the stipulations contained in the preceding Articles shall be binding.

== Legacy ==
The treatment of prisoners of the First Carlist War was thus regulated. The positive effects were immediate. A soldier of the British Legion wrote that:

The British and Chapelgorris who fell into their hands [the Carlists], were mercilessly put to death, sometimes by means of tortures worthy of the North American Indians; but the Spanish troops of the line were saved by virtue, I believe, of the Eliot treaty, and after being kept for some time in prison, where they were treated with sufficient harshness, were frequently exchanged for an equal number of prisoners made by the Christinos.

Charles Frederick Henningsen, who had served with the Carlists, dedicated his book, Twelve Months' Campaign with Zumalacárregui, to Lord Eliot, whom he described as "one of the very few who have in any way interfered in the civil strife now desolating Spain, whose name will not be a curse to her people, but on whose head the blessings of all ranks of Spaniards will be showered."

However, though “it was mutually agreed upon to treat the prisoners taken on either side according to the ordinary rules of war, a few months only elapsed before similar barbarities were practiced with all their former remorselessness.”

== Primary sources ==
- Edward Granville Eliot St. Germans, Papers Relating to Lord Eliot's Mission to Spain in the Spring of 1835 (Bickers, 1871).

== Secondary sources ==
- La Aurora de España. - Madrid, domingo 15 de diciembre de 1833.
- C.F. Henningsen. – Campaña de doce meses en Navarra y las Provincias Vascongadas con el general Zumalacárregui. Buenos Aires, 1947.
- Panorama Español. - Tomo II. Madrid, 1842.
- Antonio Pirala. - Historia de la Guerra Civil. Madrid, 1984.
- J. Antonio Zaratiegui. – Vida y hechos de D. Tomás de Zumalacárregui. San Sebastián, 1946
