= Oliver De Lancey =

Oliver De Lancey may refer to:

- Oliver De Lancey (American loyalist) (1718–1785), merchant, New York Loyalist politician and major-general during the American War of Independence
- Oliver De Lancey (British Army officer, died 1822) (c. 1749–1822), British Army officer who took part in the American War of Independence and the French Revolutionary Wars
- Oliver De Lancey (British Army and Auxiliary Legion officer) (1803–1837), British Army officer, volunteered for Spanish Legion and died fighting in Spain during the First Carlist War
