= Aranzueque =

Aranzueque, Spain
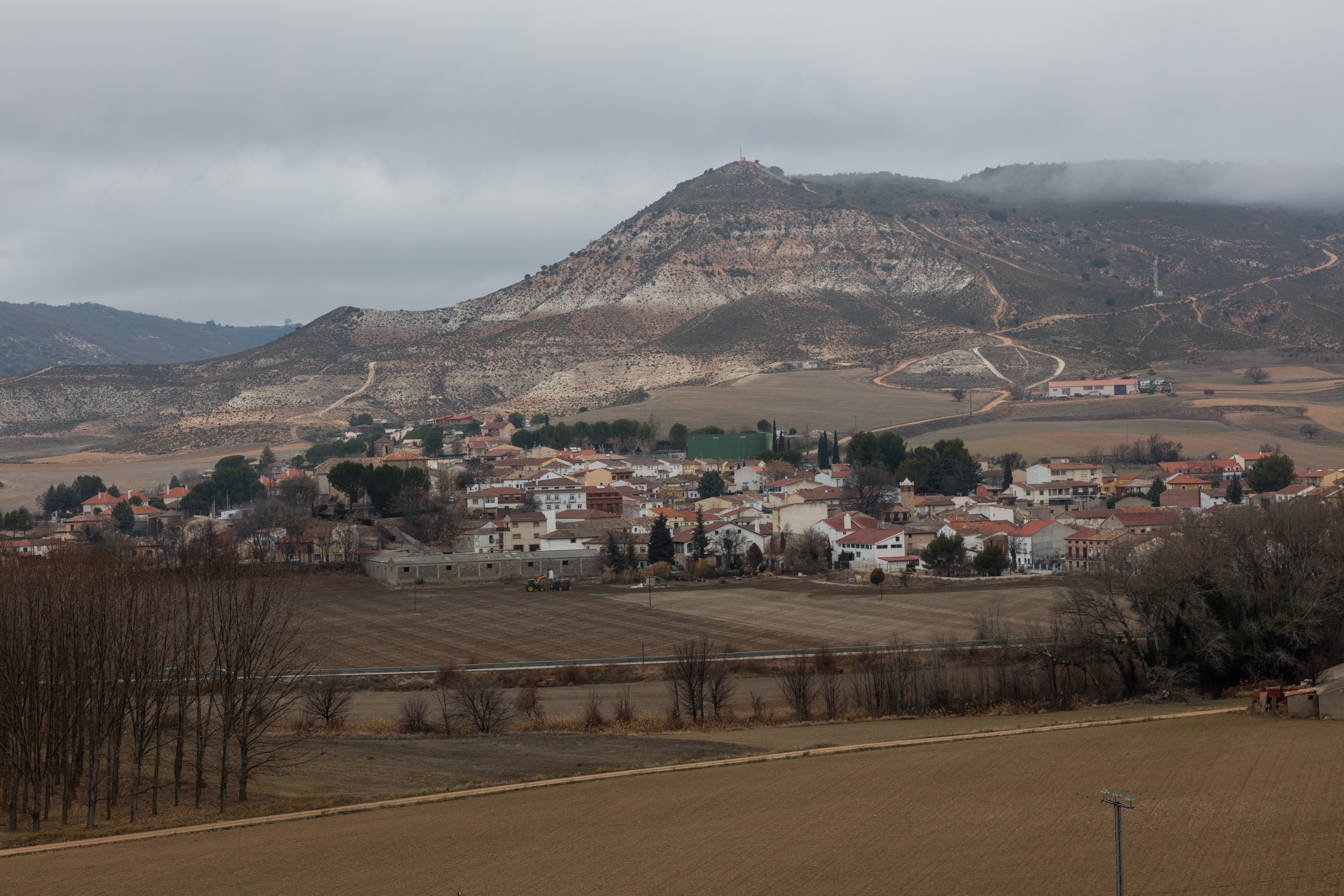

- Coat of arms

- Location within Province of Guadalajara Location within Castilla-La Mancha Location within Spain
- Coordinates: 40°29′36″N 3°04′36″W
- Country: Spain
- Autonomous community: Castile-La Mancha
- Province: Guadalajara
- Municipality: Aranzueque

Area
  - Total: 21.43 km^{2} (8.27 sq mi)
- Elevation: 696 m (2,283 ft)

Population (2025-01-01)
  - Total: 411
  - Density: 19.2/km^{2} (49.7/sq mi)
- Time zone: UTC+1 (CET)
  - Summer (DST): UTC+2 (CEST)

Aranzueque is a municipality located in the province of Guadalajara, Castile-La Mancha, Spain. According to the 2004 census (INE), the municipality had a population of 385 inhabitants.
