= Parties and factions in Isabelline Spain =

There were numerous political parties and factions in Isabelline Spain (Spain during the reign of Isabella II, who reigned 29 September 1833 – 30 September 1868). Some of them are known by multiple names, and in many cases the lines between these were fluid over time, both in terms of individuals moving from one party or faction to another and in terms of parties or factions changing their stances. Many of these factions are subgroups of parties, and groupings sometimes overlapped. Many factions (especially within the Moderate Party) were based on little more than political clientelism.

== Carlists and Christinos ==
When Isabella first became queen, she was only three years old. The queen mother, Maria Christina of the Two Sicilies, served as regent. The first and foremost political division of the Isabeline era was between Carlists and Christinos (or Isabelinos), the former being supporters of Infante Carlos, Count of Molina, a rival claimant to the throne and the latter being supporters of Maria Christina and Isabella. The former supported absolute monarchism and the traditionalism of the Antiguo Régimen ("Old Regime"); they were uniformly close to the Roman Catholic Church, and generally clericalist. The latter were generally supporters of constitutional monarchy (although some, including Maria Christina herself, were more inclined toward enlightened absolutism); they were liberals of one stripe or another, ranging from liberal conservatives and those whose liberalism was strictly economic to social liberals. In the 1830s, these two groups faced off in the First Carlist War, which the Cristinos won. The terms of surrender—notably the Convention of Vergara—left an opportunity for relatively moderate Carlists to continue to play a role in the country's politics, and many did so over the ensuing decades.

Another term strongly associated with the Carlist faction is apostólicos, a term deriving from their strong ties to clericalism. This term actually predates Carlist; this was already the name of a faction in the time of Ferdinand VII before they had settled on the Infante Carlos, Ferdinand's younger brother, as their champion

== Political parties ==
Leaving aside the Carlists, four groups within the Isabelino camp are generally considered to be political parties, although the two that came first chronologically did not have quite the formal organization that the term "party" may imply. These first two were the Moderates (moderados) and Progressives (progresistas), both of them with roots going back at least to the trienio liberal of 1820–1823. The latter two were the Democrats (demócratas, who established themselves as the Partido Progresista-Demócrata in 1849) and the Liberal Union (Unión Liberal, formally founded 1858). In keeping with the Praetorianism that was such a factor in the Spanish politics of the time—coups and coup attempts were routine—the Moderates, Progressives, and Liberal Union were each closely associated with a general, respectively Ramón María Narváez, Baldomero Espartero, and Leopoldo O'Donnell.

== Factions ==
Within these parties were numerous factions; as remarked above, many of these were rather fluid (as, at times, were the parties themselves). To begin with, there were the doceañistas, associated with the Cortes of Cádiz and the Constitution of 1812, and the veinteañistas or exaltados, slightly younger, somewhat farther to the left, associated with the trienio liberal (1820–1823). To a large extent, these corresponded to the Moderates and Progressives, respectively, though there were certainly exceptions. Furthermore, there were the afrancesados ("Frenchified"), a term that could refer to anyone associated with the Enlightenment, but especially to those who had supported the regime of Joseph Bonaparte during the Peninsular War / War of Independence.

After the moderate Maria Christina was ousted as regent in September 1840, a division arose that crossed party lines, but importantly split the Progressives. Those who wanted a three-person council of regency were known as trinitarios ("Trinitarians"), those who wanted a single regent as unitarios ("Unitarians"). The Moderates were nearly all unitarios.

The Moderates can generally be divided into puritanos and doctrinarios. The former, headed by Joaquín Francisco Pacheco and Nicomedes Pastor Díaz, favored strict constitutionalism according to the Constitution of 1837, even if it meant that the party was less likely to hold power continuously. The doctrinarios were more willing to use "illegality and subterfuge" to hold power for the party. The doctrinarios were further divided into fluid groups based on clientelism: narvaístas (around General Narváez), monistas (around Alejandro Mon), pidalistas (followers of Pedro Pidal), and polacos (around Luis Sartorius, and so named because of Sartorius's Polish ancestry.)

Also leagued with the Moderates were the vilumistas, led by the Marquess of Viluma, who wished to go back to the enlightened absolutism of the Royal Statute of 1834. The vilumistas, unlike most other Moderates, were open to a coalition with the Carlists.

Among the Progressives, the divisions were more ideological. The right wing of the Progressives overlapped the Moderates politically. This included the isturizta personal faction around Francisco Javier Istúriz, which at times allied with the Moderates against the rest of the Progressives. While some authors use exaltados almost interchangeably with progresistas, others view this as an anachronism. Left progresistas were also known as puros.

The Democrats also covered a wide range of views. Party leader Nicolás Rivero was a constitutional monarchist. Emilio Castellar and Francisco Pi y Margall were both republicans, but the former was more interested in winning the Progressives over to Republicanism and the latter with building a mass movement among the populacho. Sisto Sáenz de la Cámara was socialist along lines similar to Louis Blanc in France; in 1855–1856, Sáenz advocated revolutionary terror, undermining the loose Progressive-Democrat alliance of the bienio progresista.

Finally, Leopoldo O'Donnell's Liberal Union, founded 1858, attempted to bridge nearly all of these groups. Its members included doctrinarios, puritanos, Progressives and even some Democrats. Unsurprisingly, such a broad coalition eventually fragmented back into many separate pieces.
