= James De Lancey (disambiguation) =

James De Lancey (1703–1760) was chief justice and lieutenant governor of the Province of New York (uncle of James De Lancey (loyalist)).

James De Lancey may also refer to:

- James De Lancey (loyalist) (1746–1804), loyalist soldier in the American Revolution, Nova Scotia politician (nephew of James De Lancey)
- James De Lancey (politician) (1732–1800), colonial New York politician and soldier
