= British Auxiliary Legion =

British military force sent to Spain in the First Carlist War

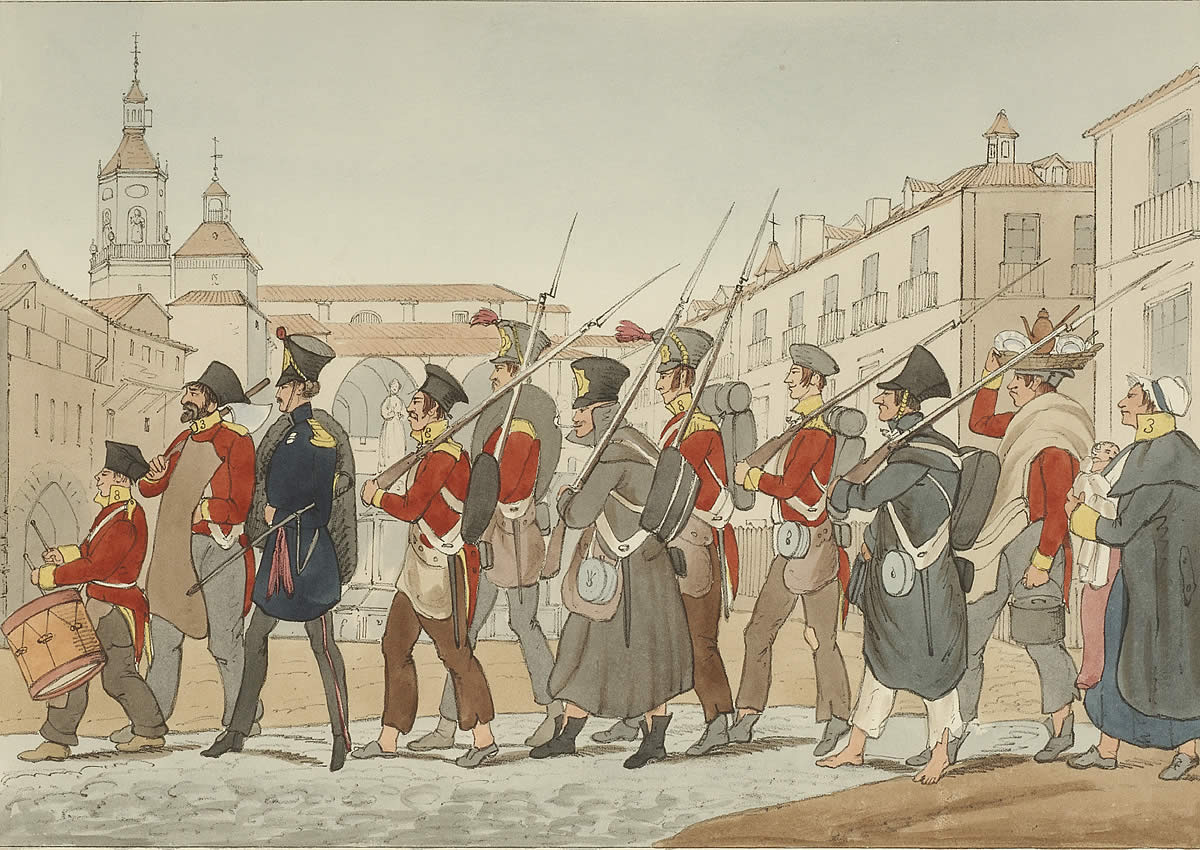
1837 lithograph of troops of the Legion at Vitoria

The British Auxiliary Legion, also called the British Legion (La Legión Británica) or Westminster Legion, existed from 1835 to 1837. It was a British military force sent to Spain to support the Liberals and Queen Isabella II of Spain against the Carlists in the First Carlist War.

== History ==
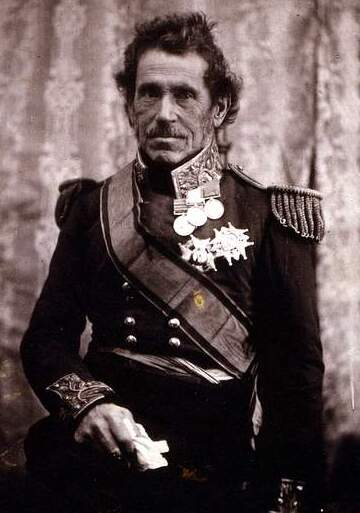
Sir George De Lacy Evans, 1st commander of the Auxiliary Legion

Under the Quadruple Alliance, Great Britain had controlled maritime traffic along the Cantabrian coast since the beginning of the war.

In 1835 the war was not going well for the Liberal side and they asked their allies to become more involved in the war. The French sent their Foreign Legion which landed at Tarragona on 17 August with around 4,000 men and was renamed the Spanish Legion. Although the British refused to send troops directly, in June 1835, they decided to form a "military volunteer corps", and that became designated an auxiliary to the Spanish Legion. The corps was to be funded and their soldiers paid by the Spanish crown.

By the end of the summer of 1836 a force of 10,000 men under the command of De Lacy Evans had assembled in San Sebastian (Basque Country). They fought near Hernani and Vitoria, but were pushed back and had to hold the fort on Mount Urgull de San Sebastian, to prevent the Carlists from taking the city.

In November 1836 they were put under the command of Baldomero Espartero and helped to lift the siege of Bilbao.

In 1837 the Legion suffered a serious defeat in the Battle of Oriamendi, but later they led a successful offensive on the Carlist rearguard along the Biscay coast, launched in response to the Expedición Real, an attempt by the Carlists main force to march on Madrid. In the course of the offensive, Legion and Spanish loyalist forces managed to take over Irun on 17 May.

The volunteers had signed on for a tour of two years and by July 1837 most of the men had returned home. The transport Prince Regent carried some 520 men to Greenock. The transport Parmelia carried 200 to Portsmouth.

Some 1,500–1,700 men remained under the name of New Legion, commanded by Brigadier-General Maurice Charles O'Connell. Their casualties were so heavy, especially during their defeat at the battle of Andoain on 14 September, that in practical terms the new unit ceased to exist as an operational force after this action. Prince Regent carried some 600 men to Cork and Greenock. The New Legion was formally disbanded on 10 December 1837.

In total a quarter of the force – some 2,500 men – died, only half of them in combat. Their presence had not been well received by the Carlists; one former soldier wrote

"To our foes, we of the British Legion were the most odious of all; strangers, mercenaries, heretics, scoffers, polluters of their sacred soil; so they did term us. For us there was no quarter; in the heat of battle, or by cold judicial form, it was all the same: to fall into their hands was certainly a tortured death."

== Organization ==
It would appear that most of the 9,600 men forming the Legion were volunteers from British Army line regiments. The only "regular" troops who served in the war were men of the Royal Navy, Royal Marines, Royal Artillery, and Royal Engineers. Recruiting and training began in 1835. The Legion was to comprise 8,500 infantry (in 10 battalions), 550 rifles, 700 cavalry and 300 artillery.

=== Units ===
==== Legion Units ====
Colour of the 5th Scotch Battalion

- Cavalry – Consisted of two Regiments:
  - 1st Reina Isabel Lancers – English
  - 2nd Queen's Own Irish Lancers – Irish
- Infantry – Consisted of ten battalions organised into "English", "Scottish" and "Irish" brigades. All foot units were single battalion regiments with six battalion/centre companies, one Light company, and one Grenadier company.
  - 1st English Battalion
  - 2nd English Battalion
  - 3rd Westminster Grenadiers – English
  - 4th Queen's Own Fusiliers – English
  - 5th Scotch – Scottish
  - 6th Scotch Grenadiers – Scottish
  - 7th Irish Light Infantry – Irish
  - 8th Highlanders – Scottish
  - 9th Irish Grenadiers – Irish
  - 10th Munster Light Infantry – Irish

Note - the 7th "the Irish Light Infantry", 9th Battalion, the Irish Grenadiers and 10th battalion, Munster Light Infantry, were brigaded together under Brigadier-General Charles Shaw, a veteran of 1815 and the Portuguese Civil War. The brigade quickly won a reputation for being one of the toughest units of the Legion.

- Light Infantry – The Rifle Brigade, British Auxiliary Legion
- Artillery – English
- Corps of Sappers and Miners – multiethnic
- Hospital Transport Corps – multiethnic

==== British regulars attached to the Legion ====
On occasion some regular British troops were attached to the Legion, including:

- Royal Marines – 400 men
  - Royal Marine Artillery
- Royal Artillery
- The Chapelgorris, a Cristino volunteer unit, was attached to the Legion from 1836.

The first British Marines under Lord John Hay (the British Commodore) landed to garrison Portugalete in April 1836. In May the Royal Marines were expanded to a full battalion under Major John Owen. Small detachments of Royal Marine Artillery, Royal Artillery and Royal Engineers were subsequently added.

In November 1836, 39 officers and men of the British Royal Artillery joined the naval force supporting the British Auxiliary Legion. 60 additional men arrived in January 1837. There were also 100 men of the Royal Marine Artillery. Cairns says all British Artillery used 9-pounder smoothbore field pieces and 5 1/2" howitzers, along with a few Congreve rocket launchers and light mountain pieces. Somerville (1995), however, gives the British Auxiliary Legion 6-pounders and short 12-pounders (presumably howitzers) and the Royal Artillery larger pieces including large howitzers.

Legion artillery organisation:

British Royal and Marine Artillery:

- 1 × Field Battery: 2 × light 6-pounders and 2 × 12-pounder howitzers in total; wagons drawn by mules
- 1 × Mountain Battery (Royal Artillery): 4 × 12-pounder mountain howitzers; some 12-pounder rockets; mules
- 1 × Royal Artillery Rocket detachment
- 1 × Reserve Artillery: 2 × 18-pounder guns

British Auxiliary Legion Artillery

- 1 × Field Battery with two light 6-pounders and two 12-pounder howitzers in total

Spanish artillery:

- 1 × Mountain Battery with 4 guns

== British Auxiliary Brigade (1838–39) ==
After the withdrawal of the British-commanded Auxiliary Legion and New Legion in 1837, a smaller 400-men unit of British volunteers was established in March 1838 within the ranks of the Spanish army. The battalion was led by Irish-born Spanish Colonel Federico Ricardo Lasaussaye and designed Brigada Auxiliar Británica ("British Auxiliary Brigade"). Early into its existence, the Brigade was struck by a fever outbreak, which left one soldier dead and 30 hospitalised. The Brigade was made up of the remainders of Reina Isabel Lancers and the Legion's field battery. The unit, specially its cavalry component, was part of the Spanish forces that captured the Carlist stronghold of Barasoain, and successfully engaged the Carlist cavalry at Sesma.

== See also ==
- Foreign legion
- Foreign volunteers

== Bibliography ==
- Brett, Edward M. (2005). The British Auxiliary Legion in the First Carlist War 1835-1838: A Forgotten Army. Dublin: Four Courts Press.
- Bullen, Roger and Strong, Felicity (eds.). Prime Minister Papers Series I. Palmerston: Private Correspondence with Sir George Villiers (afterwards 4th Earl of Clarendon) as Minister to Spain 1833–1837. London: Royal Commission of Historical Manuscripts, HMSO, 1985.
- Cairns, C. (1995). A Savage and Romantic War: Spain 1833–1840. Part 5: The Battle of Oriamendi. Wargames Illustrated, 99, pp. 24–30.
- Chant, R. H. (1983). Spanish Tiger: The Life and Times of Ramón Cabrera. New York: Midas.
- Coverdale, John F. (1984). The Basque Phase of Spain's First Carlist War. Princeton: Princeton University Press.
- De Porras y Rodríguez de León, Gonzalo. La Expedición de Rodil y las Legiones Extranjeras en la Primera Guerra Carlista. Madrid: Ministerio de Defensa, 2004.
- Duncan, F. (1997). The English in Spain: The story of the War of Succession between 1834 and 1840 (Vols. 1–6). UK: Pallas Armata. (Original work published 1877.)
- Evans, Sir George De Lacy (1840). Memoranda of the Contest in Spain. London: James Ridgway.
- Field, C. (1995). Some account of the British operations against the Carlists, 1836–1837. Tonbridge, UK: Pallas Armata. Reprinted from the Journal of the Royal United Service Institution LXII:446, May 1917, pp. 209–223.
- Holt, E. (1967). The Carlist Wars in Spain. London: Putnam.
- Parsons, P. (1996). The British Auxiliary Legion of the First Carlist War (The First Legion 1835–37). Wargames Illustrated 110, pp. 18–19.
- Pirala, Antonio (1984). Historia de la Guerra Civil. Madrid: Turner SA / Historia 16. (6 Volumes).
- Rodriguez, Moises Enrique (2009). Under the Flags of Freedom: British Mercenaries in the War of the Two Brothers, the First Carlist War, and the Greek War of Independence (1821-1840). Lanham, Maryland.
- Shaw, Charles (1837). Personal Memoirs & Correspondence of Col. Charles Shaw, comprising a Narrative of the War for Constitutional Liberty in Portugal and Spain. London: Henry Colburn Publishers. (2 Volumes).
- Shelley, Ronald G. (1975). The British Legion in Spain during the First Carlist War. Brighton: Spanish Philatelic Society.
- Somerville, A. (1995). History of the British Legion and War in Spain. Tonbridge, UK: Pallas Armata. Reprinted from the edition published by James Pattie, 1839.
- Spiers, E. M. (1983). Radical General: Sir George De Lacy Evans 1787–1870. Manchester University Press.
