= George de Lacy Evans =

British Army officer and politician (1787–1870)

General Sir George de Lacy Evans GCB
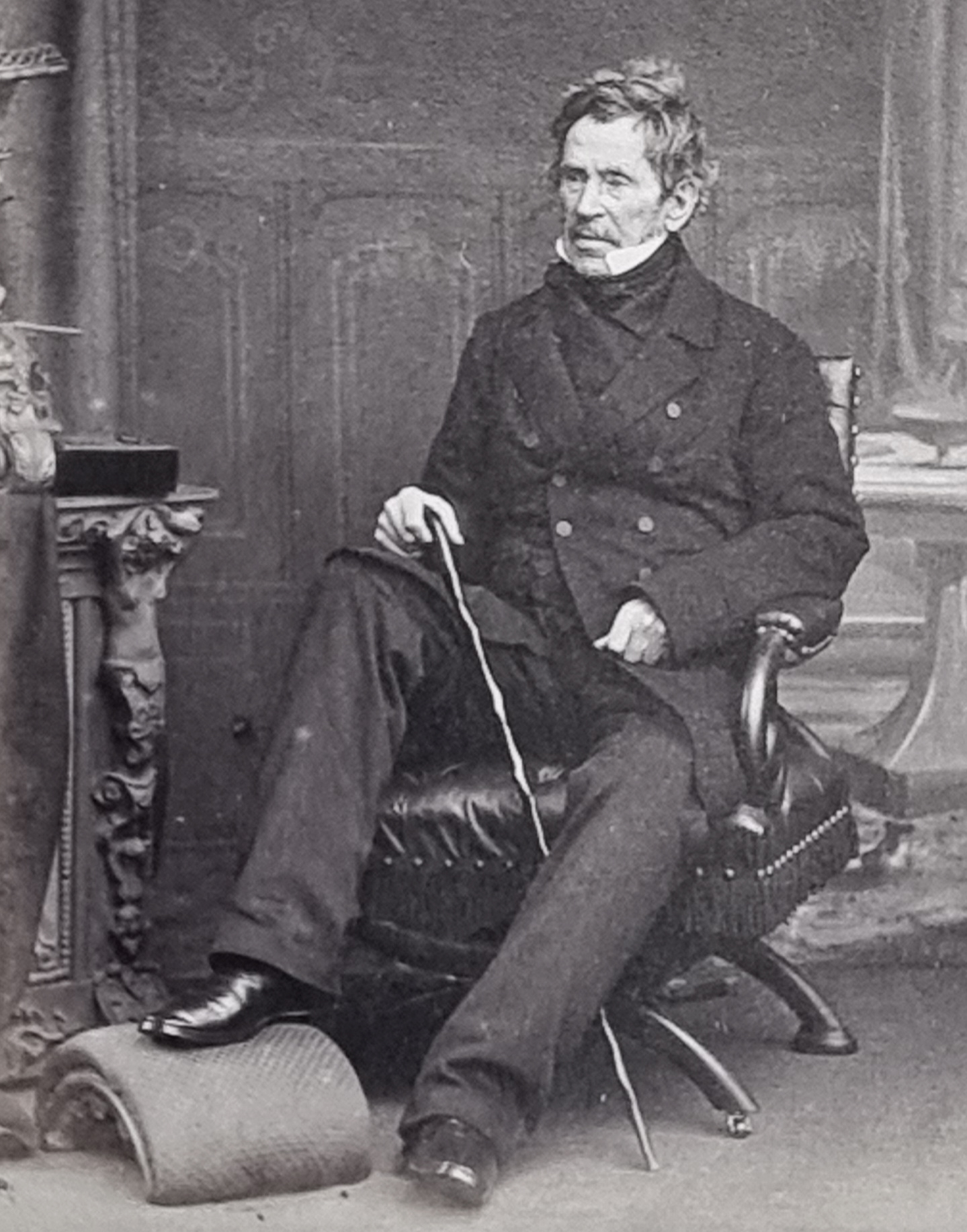
- Portrait of George de Lacy Evans, c. 1863
- Born: 7 October 1787; Moig, County Limerick, Ireland
- Died: 9 January 1870 (aged 82)
- Military career
- Allegiance: United Kingdom
- Branch: British Army
- Rank: General
- Commands: British Auxiliary Legion; 2nd Division
- Conflicts: War of 1812; Battle of Bladensburg; Burning of Washington; Battle of North Point; Battle of Lake Borgne; Battle of New Orleans; Napoleonic Wars: Battle of Quatre Bras; Battle of Waterloo; First Carlist War; Crimean War
- Awards: Knight Grand Cross of the Order of the Bath; Grand Cross of the Legion of Honour (France)
- Other work: Member of Parliament

General Sir George de Lacy Evans GCB (7 October 1787 – 9 January 1870) was a British Army officer and politician who served in the Napoleonic Wars and War of 1812.

== Life ==
Evans was born in 1787, in Moig, County Limerick, Ireland. Educated at Woolwich Academy he followed his elder brother Richard (1782–1847) into the military, joining the East India Company's forces in 1800 before volunteering for the British Army in India in 1806. He obtained an ensigncy in the 22nd Regiment of Foot in 1807 then exchanged into the 3rd Light Dragoons in order to take part in the Peninsular War.

He was sent on the expedition to the United States of 1814 during the War of 1812 under Major General Robert Ross. Evans was quartermaster general to Ross at the Battle of Bladensburg on 24 August 1814, and during the Burning of Washington, as well as at the Battle of North Point on 12 September 1814, where Ross was killed.

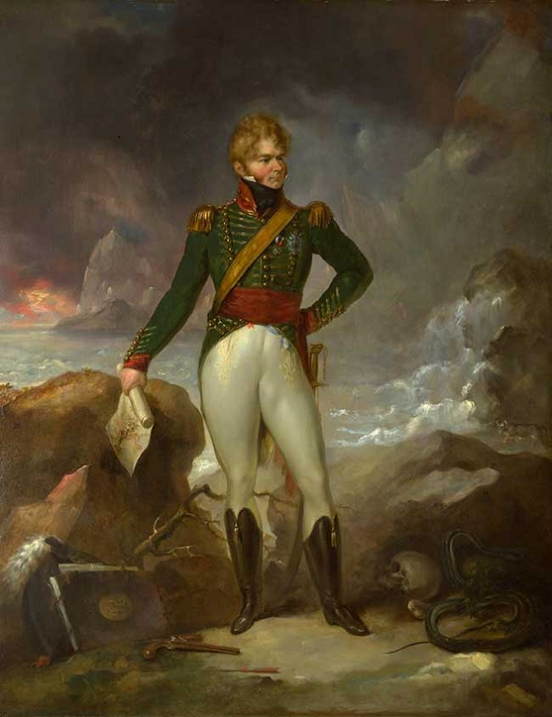
c. 1825 portrait of Evans by Peter Edward Stroehling

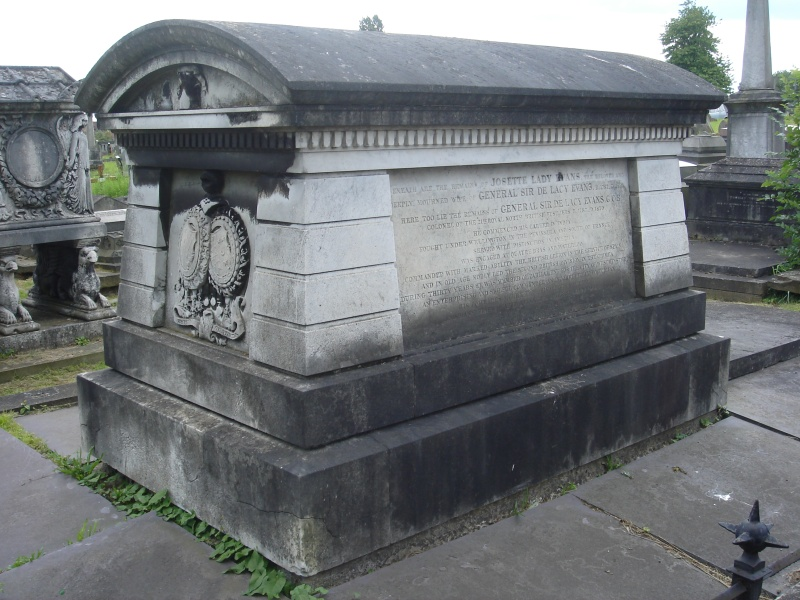
Funerary monument to Evans at the Kensal Green Cemetery

Evans was actively involved in the New Orleans campaign at the conclusion of the War of 1812. He was the only British Army officer present at the Royal Navy 'small boat action' on Lake Borgne. Thereafter, during the fighting at the battle of New Orleans, he was wounded on 24 December 1814 and 8 January 1815, appearing on the casualty lists in the London Gazette.

Returning to the European war with the restoration of Emperor Napoleon I, Evans was present at the battle of Quatre Bras on 16 June 1815 and the battle of Waterloo on 18 June 1815, and went on half pay in 1818.

Although he had no personal experience in Central Asia, Evans became increasingly concerned that Russia had designs on India posing a threat of an attack through Central Asia. He wrote two books, “On the Designs of Russia” (1828) and “On the Practicability of an Invasion of British India” (1829). highlighting this threat. These books were influential in persuading Edward Law, 1st Earl of Ellenborough, President of the Board of Control of India, to gather intelligence from all sources, including sending out young officers to explore the possible invasions routes into India, as part of the Great Game.

Evans commanded the British Auxiliary Legion, which volunteered to assist Isabella II of Spain in the First Carlist War (1833–1840). In 1846, he was promoted to Major-General, and on the outbreak of the Crimean War in 1854, he was promoted to Lieutenant-General.

In 1853 he was given the colonelcy for life of the 21st Regiment of Foot (Royal North British Fusiliers) and promoted full general on 10 March 1861.

He served as a Member of Parliament (MP) for Rye in 1830, and from 1831 to 1832, and for Westminster from 1833 to 1841 and from 1846 to 1865. He was also awarded the Grand Cross of the French Legion of Honour.

In 1854, Evans was appointed to command the 2nd Division at the start of the Crimean War, and fought at the Battle of the Alma. Around the time of the Battle of Inkerman, he was sick, so Major General John Pennefather was in command of the division. He was later invalided home. On his return home, he received the thanks of the House of Commons.

Beginning in the middle 1850s Evans became a strong advocate for reform of the British army. In particular he was harshly critical of the system by which British army officers purchased their commissions and were expected to pay for each rank of promotion. While he did not live to see the final abolition of the purchase system which occurred in 1871, his persistent call for amelioration was instrumental in its ultimate demise.

Evans died on 9 January 1870, and is buried in Kensal Green Cemetery, London.

Portraits of Evans were painted by Peter Edward Stroehling (above) and Richard Buckner. The original life-size Buckner portrait was rediscovered in 2012 and was authenticated by art historian Philip Mould on the BBC Antiques Road Show at Cheltenham in 2013.

Sir George de Lacy Evans's medals and awards are on display at the Queens Own Royal Hussars Museum located in the Lord Leycester Hospital in Warwick.

== Arms ==
Coat of arms of George de Lacy Evans

Notes
Granted 20 July 1855 by Sir John Bernard Burke, Ulster King of Arms.
Crest
Out of a mural crown Gules a demi-lion reguardant Or holding between the paws a boar's head couped Sable.
Escutcheon
Argent a mural crown Gules between three boars' heads couped Sable.
Motto
Espana Agradecida

== See also ==
- Edward De Lacy Evans

== Sources ==
- Adkin, Mark (2001). The Waterloo Companion. Aurum. ISBN 1-85410-764-X
- Barbero, Alessandro (2005). The Battle: A New History of Waterloo. Atlantic Books. ISBN 1-84354-310-9
- George, Christopher T., Terror on the Chesapeake: The War of 1812 on the Bay, Shippensburg, Pa., White Mane, 2001, ISBN 1-57249-276-7
- Spiers, Edward M. (1983). Radical General: Sir George de Lacy Evans, 1787–1870, U.K., Manchester University Press, ISBN 0-7190-0929-4
- Leigh Rayment's Historical List of MPs
- This article incorporates text from a publication now in the public domain: Wood, James, ed. (1907). The Nuttall Encyclopædia. London and New York: Frederick Warne.
- de Lacy Evans' grave at historyhome.co.uk

Parliament of the United Kingdom
Preceded by Philip Pusey; Richard Arkwright	Member of Parliament for Rye; May 1830 – August 1830; With: Richard Arkwright	Succeeded by Hugh Duncan Baillie; Francis Robert Bonham
Preceded by Hugh Duncan Baillie; Francis Robert Bonham	Member of Parliament for Rye; 1831 – 1832; With: Thomas Pemberton	Succeeded by Edward Barrett Curteis
Preceded by Sir Francis Burdett and Sir John Hobhouse	Member of Parliament for Westminster; 1833–1841; With: Francis Burdett, to 1837; John Temple Leader, from 1837	Succeeded by John Temple Leader and Henry John Rous
Preceded by John Temple Leader and Henry John Rous	Member of Parliament for Westminster; 1846–1859; With: John Temple Leader, from 1846; Charles Lushington, 1847–1852; John Shelley, from 1852	Succeeded by Robert Grosvenor and John Stuart Mill
Military offices
Preceded by Sir Frederick Adam	Colonel of the 21st (Royal North British) Fusiliers; 1853–1870	Succeeded by Sir Frederick William Hamilton
