= Christinos =

Supporters of Isabel II during the First Carlist War

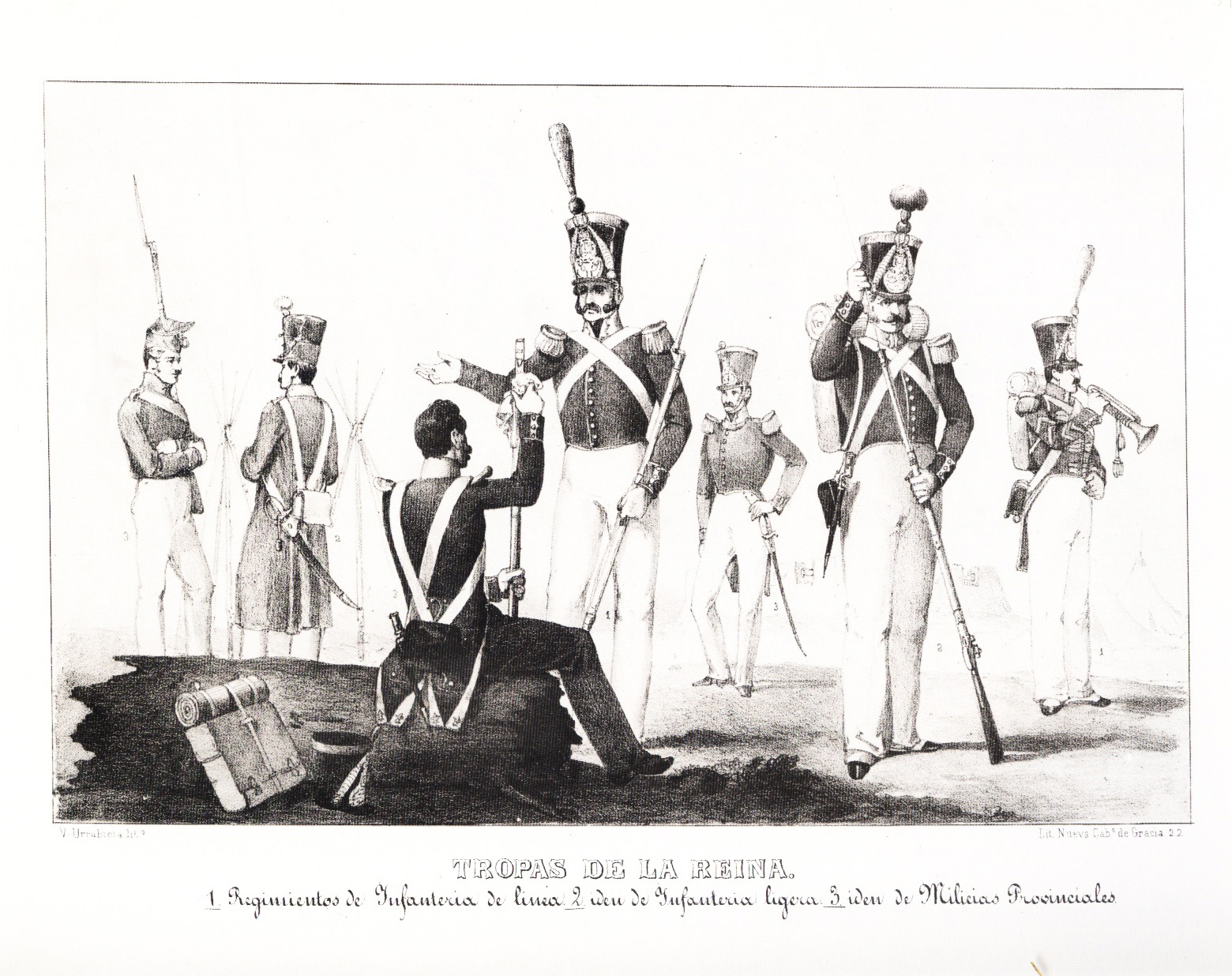
"Troops of the Queen" or Christino soldiers

The Christinos (Spanish: Cristinos) (sometimes called the Isabellinos or the Liberales) was the name for the supporters of the claim of Isabel II to the throne of Spain during the First Carlist War. The Christinos drew their name from Maria Christina, the Queen Mother of Isabel II, who rallied the Spanish Liberals to her side against the reactionary Carlists, in favor of her daughter.

== Origin ==
After the death of Ferdinand VII and his bequest of the Spanish Crown to his daughter Isabella II, his brother, Don Carlos de Bourbon, lay claim to the Spanish throne. Spanish Liberals and Progressives flocked to the claim of Isabella, hoping to resist the reactionary Don Carlos and his supporters, and Maria Christiana assented to liberal political demands in exchange for their support of her daughters claim.

== After the First Carlist War ==
Following the end of the First Carlist War, the larger coalition of Liberals that were the Christinos, now being the overwhelming majority of legitimate political force within Spain, politically fractured into the various liberal political factions that would characterize Isabelline Spain, both being an extension of older liberal political factions from the Trienio Liberal from 1820-1823.

== See also ==
- Parties and factions in Isabelline Spain
- Guiri, a possible derivation of cristino, now applied by Spaniards to foreigners.
