= Contemporary history of Spain =

Period of the history of Spain corresponding to the Contemporary Age

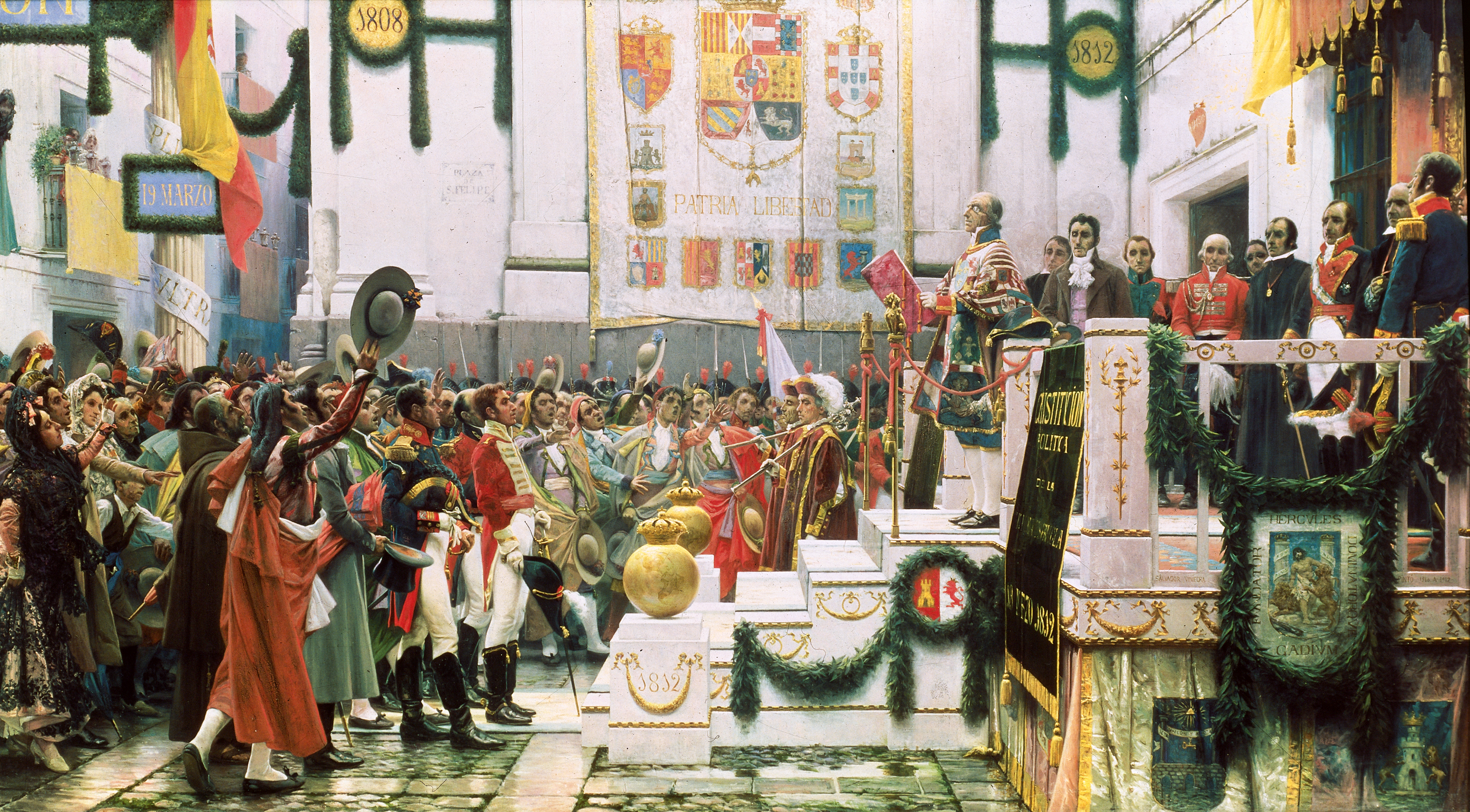
The promulgation of the Constitution of 1812, a work by Salvador Viniegra (Museo de las Cortes de Cádiz).

The contemporary history of Spain is the historiographical discipline and a historical period of Spanish history. Spanish historiography considers the beginning of the Spanish War of Independence (1808) as an initial milestone, rather than the French Revolution, the Independence of the United States or the English Industrial Revolution.

== Reign of Carlos IV (1788–1808) ==
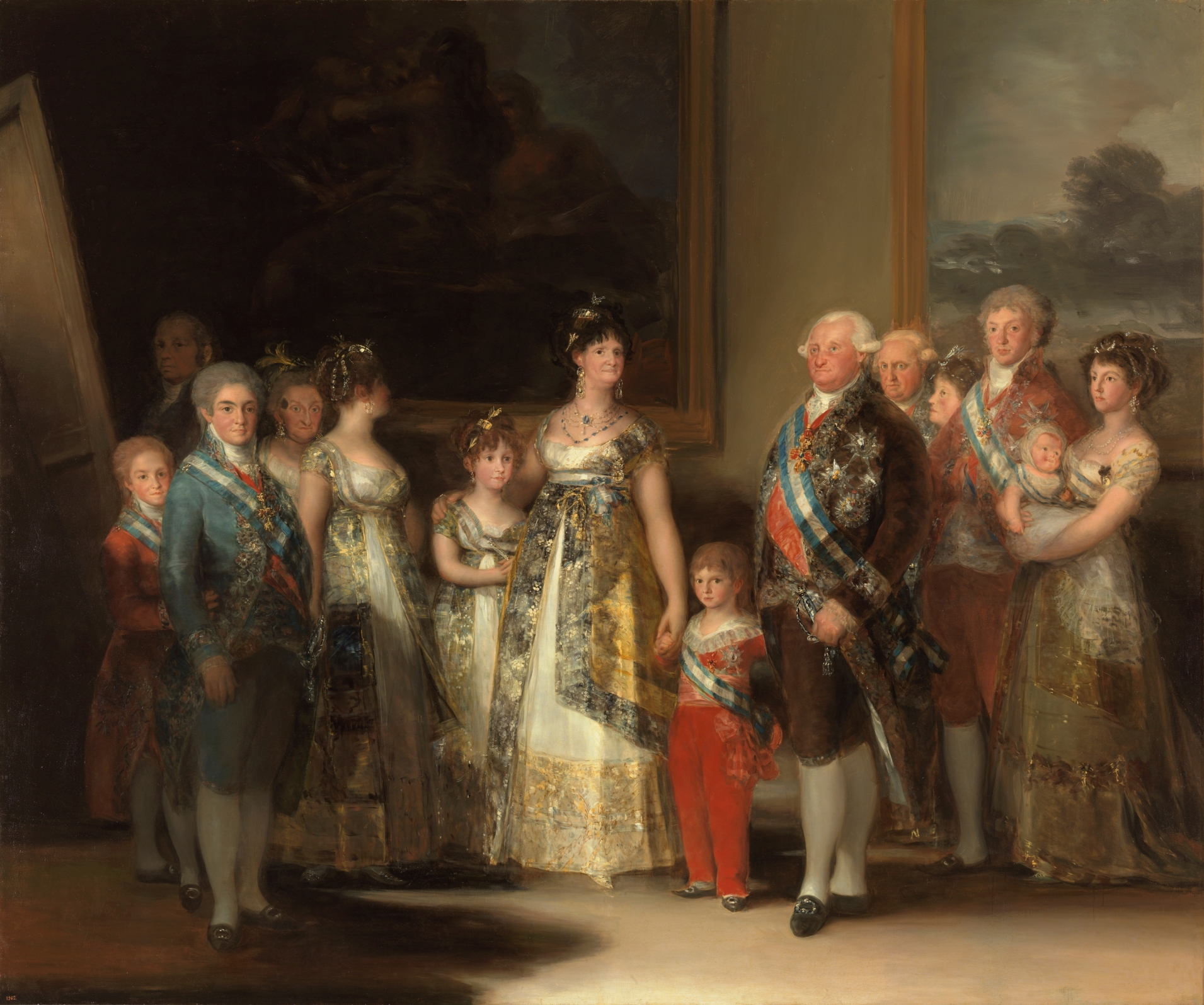
Charles IV of Spain and His Family, by Goya (1800). In the center, Charles IV and Queen Maria Luisa of Parma stand next to the infante Francisco de Paula (whose departure from the Palace will provoke the uprising of May 2, 1808, to the cry of "They are taking him away!"). On the left, just in front of the painter, appears the first-born, future Ferdinand VII, and Carlos María Isidro, the future Carlist pretender.

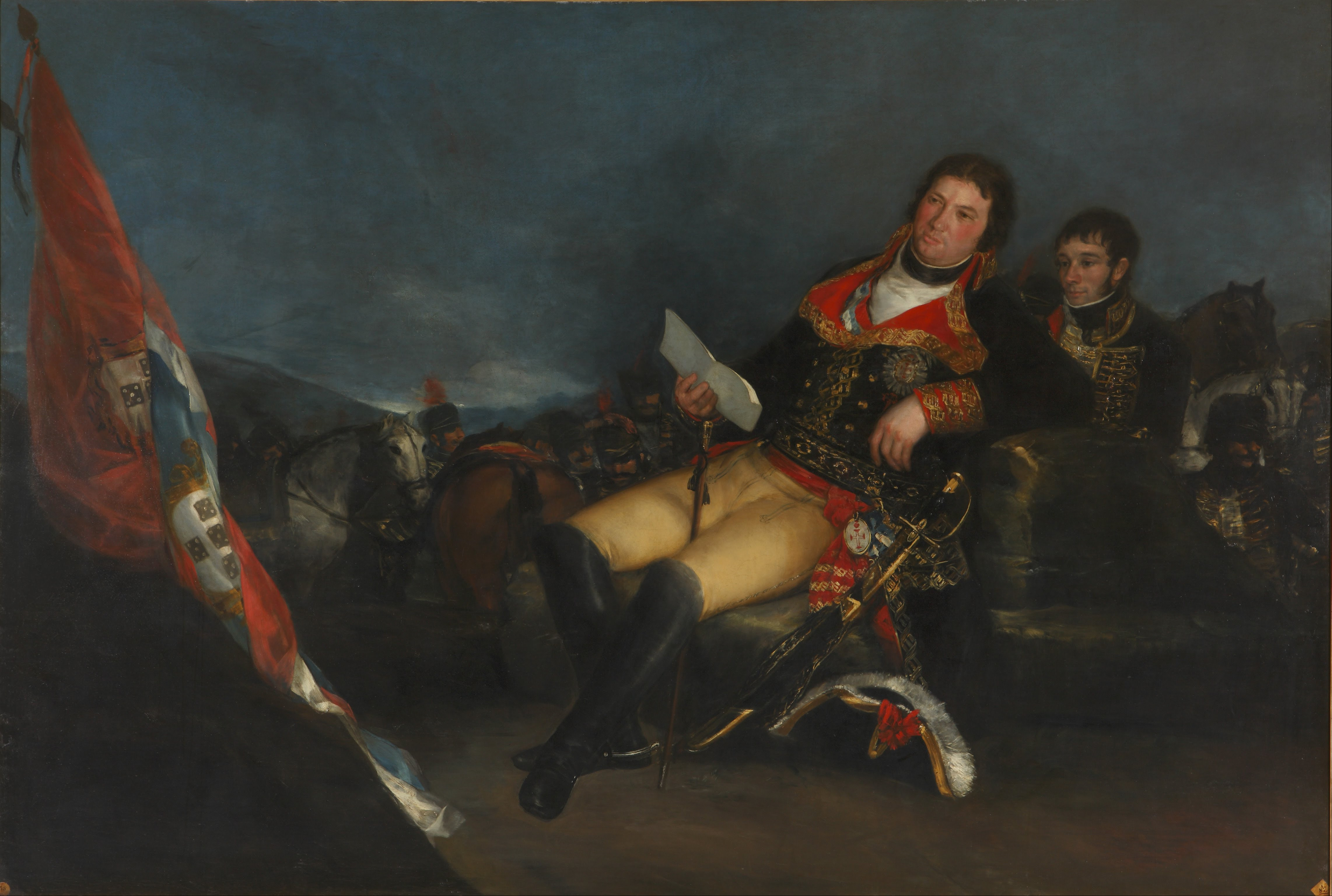
Manuel Godoy, Duke of Alcudia and Prince of Peace, by Goya (1801).

The start of the French Revolution (1789) changed the balance of power in Europe. To avoid the revolution's influence, the Spanish isolated groups of sympathizers (Picornell's conspiracy, 1795), and declared that Spain was counterrevolutionary (which was promoted by the clergy and controlled by the Inquisition). The First Coalition, which was an attempt to end the revolution, failed. After the redirection of the internal French process (Thermidorian Reaction, 1794) towards the personal power of Napoleon (1799), Spain decided to renew the Franco-Spanish alliance (Pacte de Famille).

From 1792 the favoritism of Manuel Godoy, an ambitious military man of obscure origins protected by the queen, ennobled with the title of Prince of Peace (by the Peace of Basel, 1795), displaced from power the enlightened aristocratic elite that had been ruling the country since the reign of Charles III (Floridablanca, Aranda, Jovellanos), in some cases literally driving them into exile or into prison. The limited success of the War of the Oranges against Portugal (1801) achieved a minimal border readjustment (Olivenza); but much more decisive were the serious consequences of the Battle of Trafalgar (October 21, 1805), where the best part of the Spanish Navy was lost. Despite the defeat, the linking of Godoy's position to subordination to the emperor (who had won decisive victories in land campaigns in central Europe) led to the signing of the Treaty of Fontainebleau in 1807, that foresaw the joint invasion of Portugal (weak point in the continental blockade against England) and that in fact served for several French army corps to occupy strategic areas of Spain.

Who is offended and harmed?

Spain

Who prevails in the war?

England

And who gains the upper hand?

France

Popular Tune

The deep economic crisis at the turn of the century showed the structural weakness of the Ancient Régime in Spain, in the face of which the fiscal crisis of the Monarchy (Francisco Cabarrús, Banco de San Carlos), and the commercial and financial crisis caused by the wars, were only a conjunctural aspect. The exhaustion of the upward demographic cycle of the 18th century, not supported by agrarian reforms that would allow a significant increase in production (Jovellanos' Report in the never-ending Expediente de la Ley Agraria (1795), like the rest of the Enlightenment projects since the Catastro de Ensenada (1749), did not materialize due to the opposition of the powerful privileged groups it affected), had much deeper causes; the only exceptions had been the reduction of the privileges of the Mesta by Campomanes between 1779 and 1782, and the timid liberalizing policies of the grain market —moderated after the Esquilache riots of 1766— or of trade with America (1765 and 1778), which led to subsistence crises, hunger and increased social discontent.

The scientific and strategic importance achieved by the Spanish expeditions (vaccine expedition, 1803) and the promising situation of Spanish science and technology, which had attained a position only slightly behind that of the most advanced European countries, deteriorated dramatically in the face of the State's inability to continue sustaining efforts that the delay in the socioeconomic structure could not be made up for by a private initiative that was incomparably weaker than that of England at the time, which was leading the Industrial Revolution. The persecution or disdain to which some of the main promoters of Spanish scientific-technological modernization were subjected (Alejandro Malaspina, Agustín de Betancourt) ended up benefiting other nations (as happened with the most promising of all enterprises: the American research of Alexander von Humboldt, initiated under Spanish sponsorship).

Godoy's growing unpopularity led to the formation of a Fernandine party within the court, which prepared the riot of Aranjuez, a coup d'état that managed to depose the valid and the abdication of King Charles IV to his eldest son Ferdinand VII, who, despite this, did not manage to settle on the throne because of the intervention of Napoleon, who managed to bring the entire royal family to join him in France, virtually as prisoners.

== War of Independence (1808–1814) ==
The Third of May 1808, by Goya.

The scandalous behavior of the court, the royal family and the high officials of the bureaucracy and the army before the French military occupation and the political maneuvers of Napoleon led to a social outburst whose documentary expression was fixed in the Bando of the mayors of Móstoles after the uprising of May 2, 1808 in Madrid. The rapid dissemination of the document was simultaneous with the creation of local Boards which, more or less explicitly, arrogated to themselves a sovereign representation on behalf of a captive king (Ferdinand VII the Desired); which led to increasingly revolutionary political forms: first a Supreme Central Junta (September 25, 1808), dominated by enlightened figures (Floridablanca and Jovellanos), and then a Regency Council that convened the Cortes of Cadiz (September 24, 1810), where the political group of the liberals (native denomination that ended up extending to the international political vocabulary —Diego Muñoz Torrero, Agustín Arguelles, the Count of Toreno—) managed to impose themselves on the absolutists (Bernardo Mozo de Rosales, Pedro de Quevedo y Quintano —bishop of Orense and general inquisitor—) in the drafting of the Constitution of 1812 (March 19, for which it was called La Pepa) and in legislation that dismantled the economic, social and legal bases of the Old Regime —ecclesiastical goods, mayorazgos, lordships, Inquisition, etc.—.

At the same time, a good part of the social and intellectual elite, by conviction or for convenience, began to collaborate with the authorities imposed by Napoleon, receiving the name of "afrancesados" (Mariano Luis de Urquijo, Cabarrús, Meléndez Valdés, Juan Antonio Llorente, Leandro Fernández de Moratín and a very long list of others, including Goya himself). Joseph I of Spain (Joseph Bonaparte or Pepe Botella), Napoleon's brother, who had already been designated by Napoleon as king of Naples, was called to occupy the vacant throne of Spain. The fact that he was the first king to rule theoretically under a constitution or granted charter (the Statute of Bayonne of July 8, 1808) makes him the first constitutional king of a Spain constituted as a liberal state according to the criteria of the New Regime, in this case imposed by the occupiers four years before the Cadiz deputies managed to autonomously construct the concept of national sovereignty.

The military campaigns followed one after the other with spectacular alternatives. To an initial success of the Spanish army led by General Castaños, who managed to defeat and capture in the battle of Bailén (July 19, 1808) a French army corps, in what constituted the first great land defeat of the Napoleonic Wars, the Emperor himself responded with his physical presence in the Peninsula, and a massive occupation of the territory that left only a few besieged enclaves, among them, Cadiz itself, protected by the English fleet based in Gibraltar.

The invasions of Saragoza and Gerona showed an epic resistance. Popular resistance in the form of guerrillas (the Empecinado, Espoz y Mina and the priest Merino) and the advance of Spanish, English and Portuguese regular troops commanded by the Duke of Wellington finally pushed back the French army (Battle of Arapiles, July 22, 1812 and Battle of Vitoria, June 21, 1813). The consequences of the war in terms of death, starvation and destruction of equipment and the Spanish scientific infrastructure (the result of violence, and in some cases premeditation, on both sides) were immense. The end of the French exiles opened the cycle of Spanish political exiles that would be renewed successively with each change of regime until 1977.

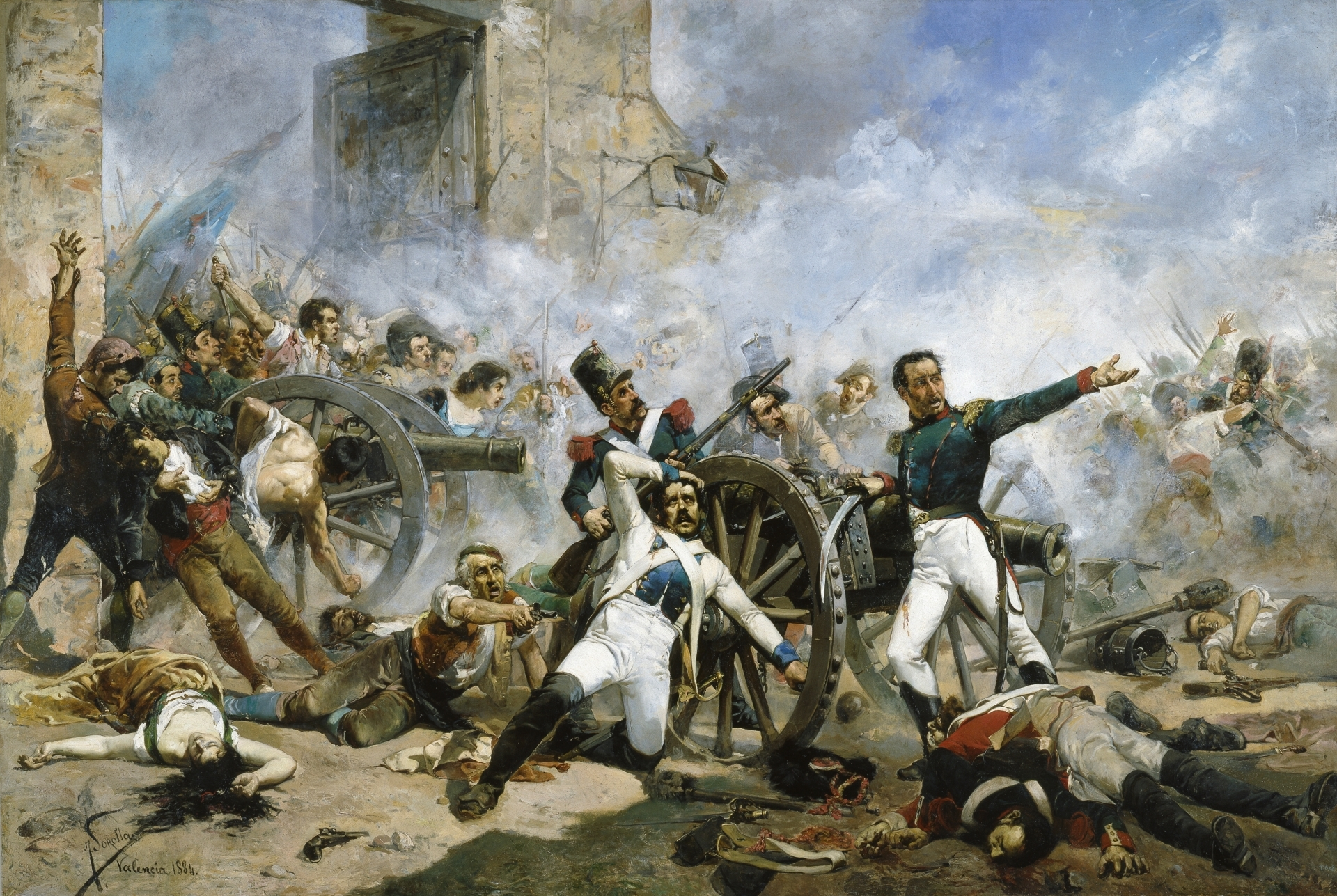
Defense of the Artillery Park of Monteleon, by Sorolla, historical painting about an episode of the uprising of May 2, 1808 in Madrid.

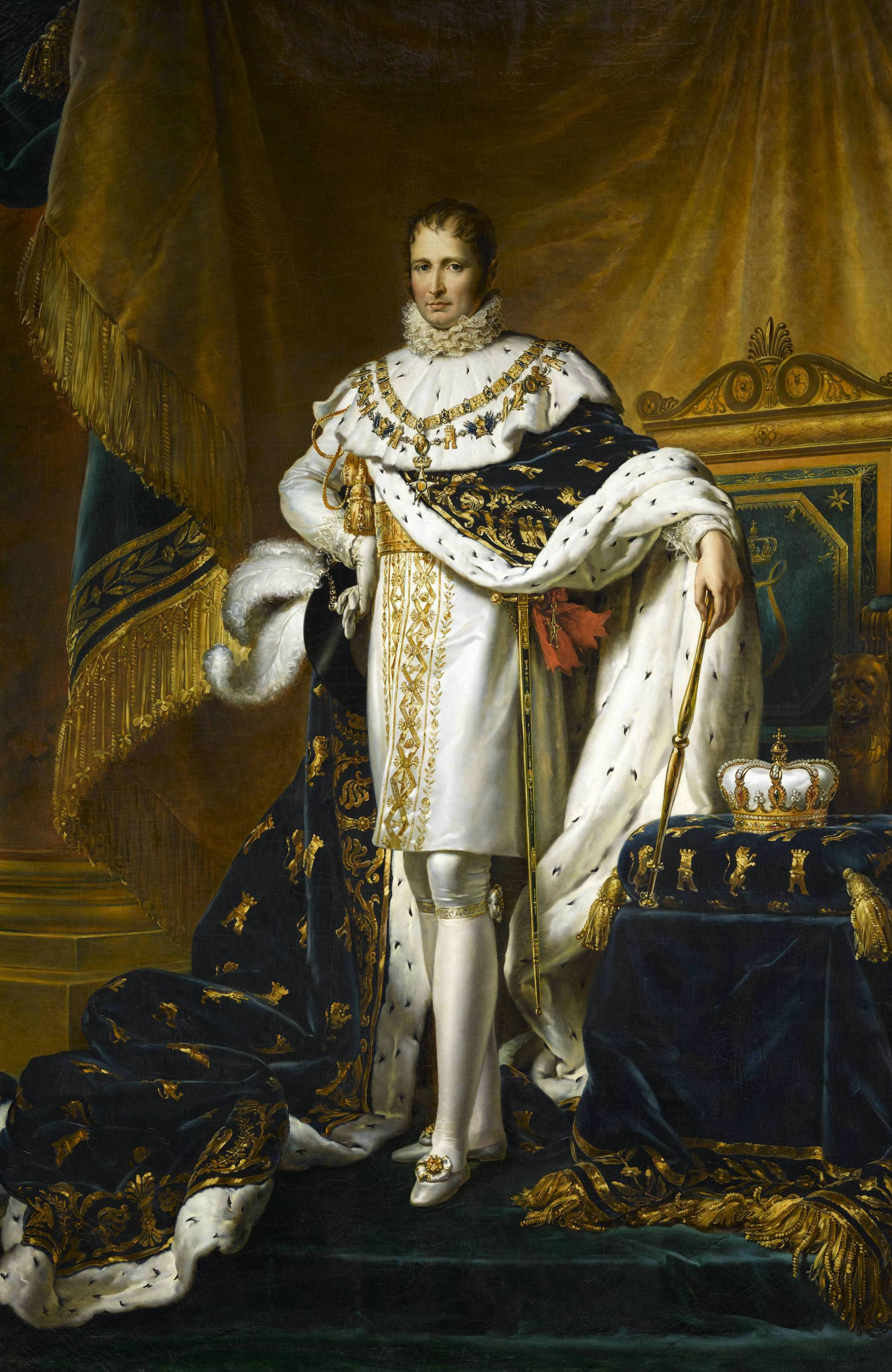
Joseph Bonaparte, King of Spain, by Gérard.

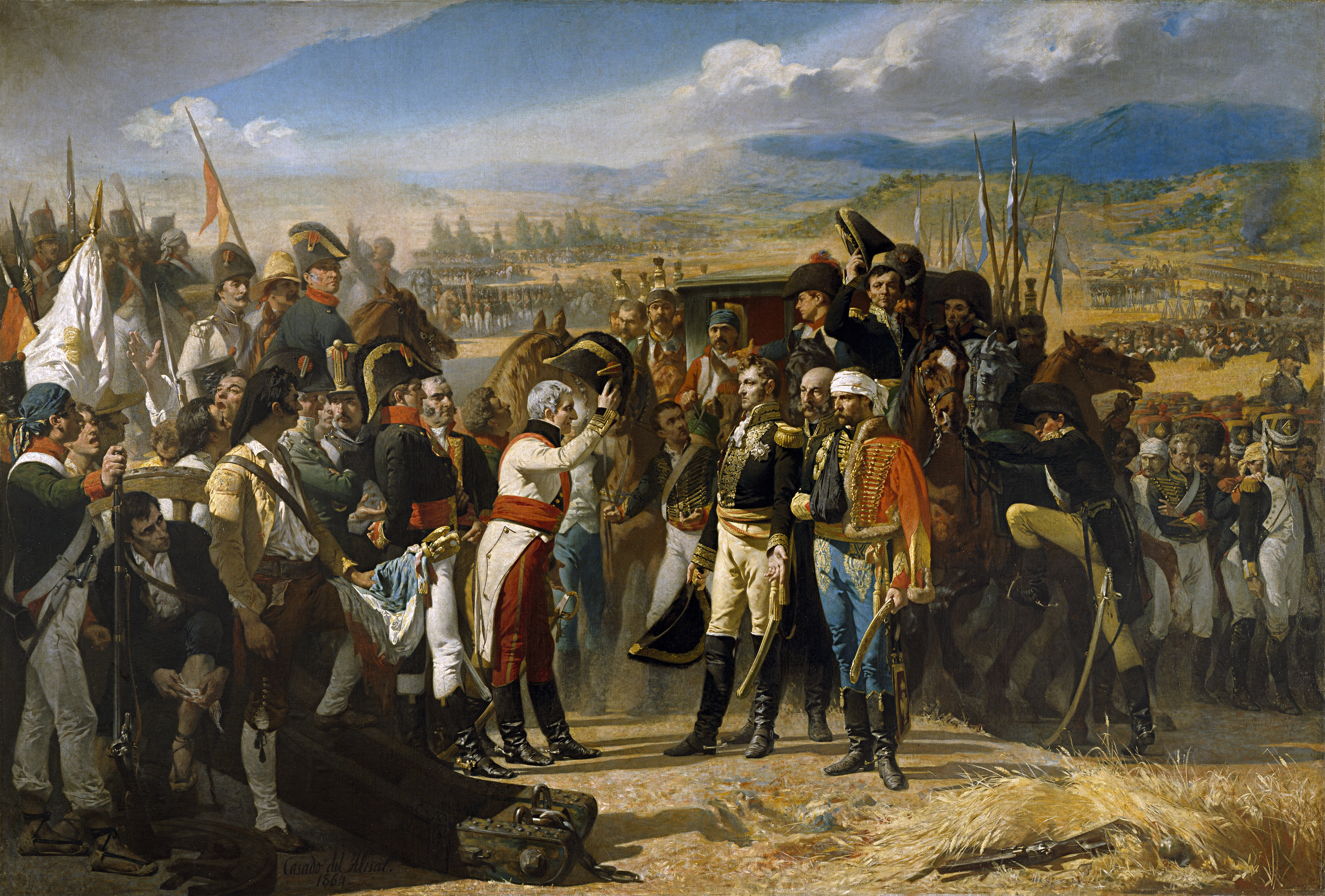
The Surrender of Bailén, by José Casado del Alisal, historical painting about the battle of Bailén in 1808, with a composition based on The Surrender of Breda, by Velázquez.

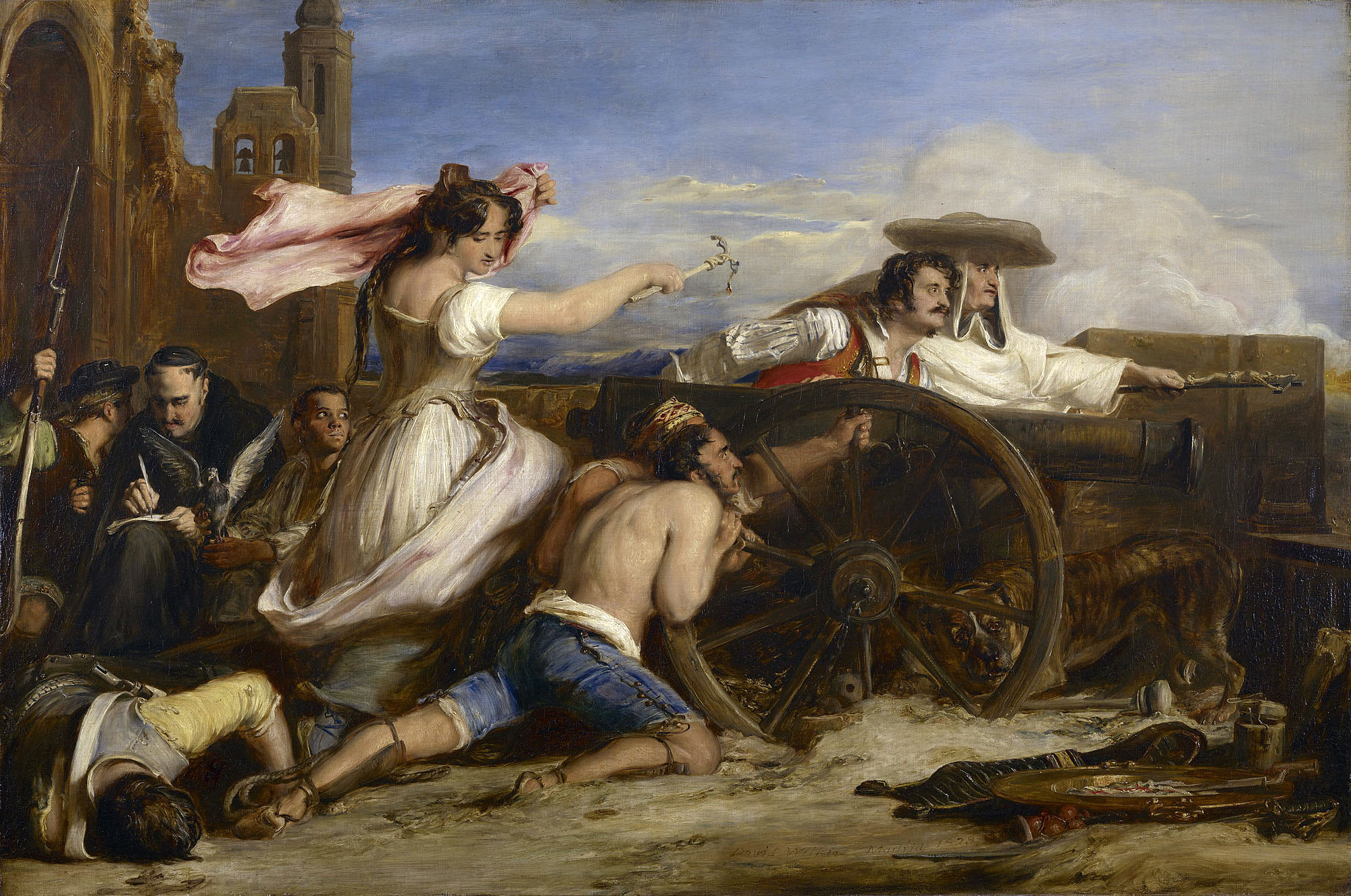
Agustina de Aragón during the siege of Zaragoza, in a painting The Defence of Saragossa by David Wilkie in 1828.

== Spanish-American Independence ==
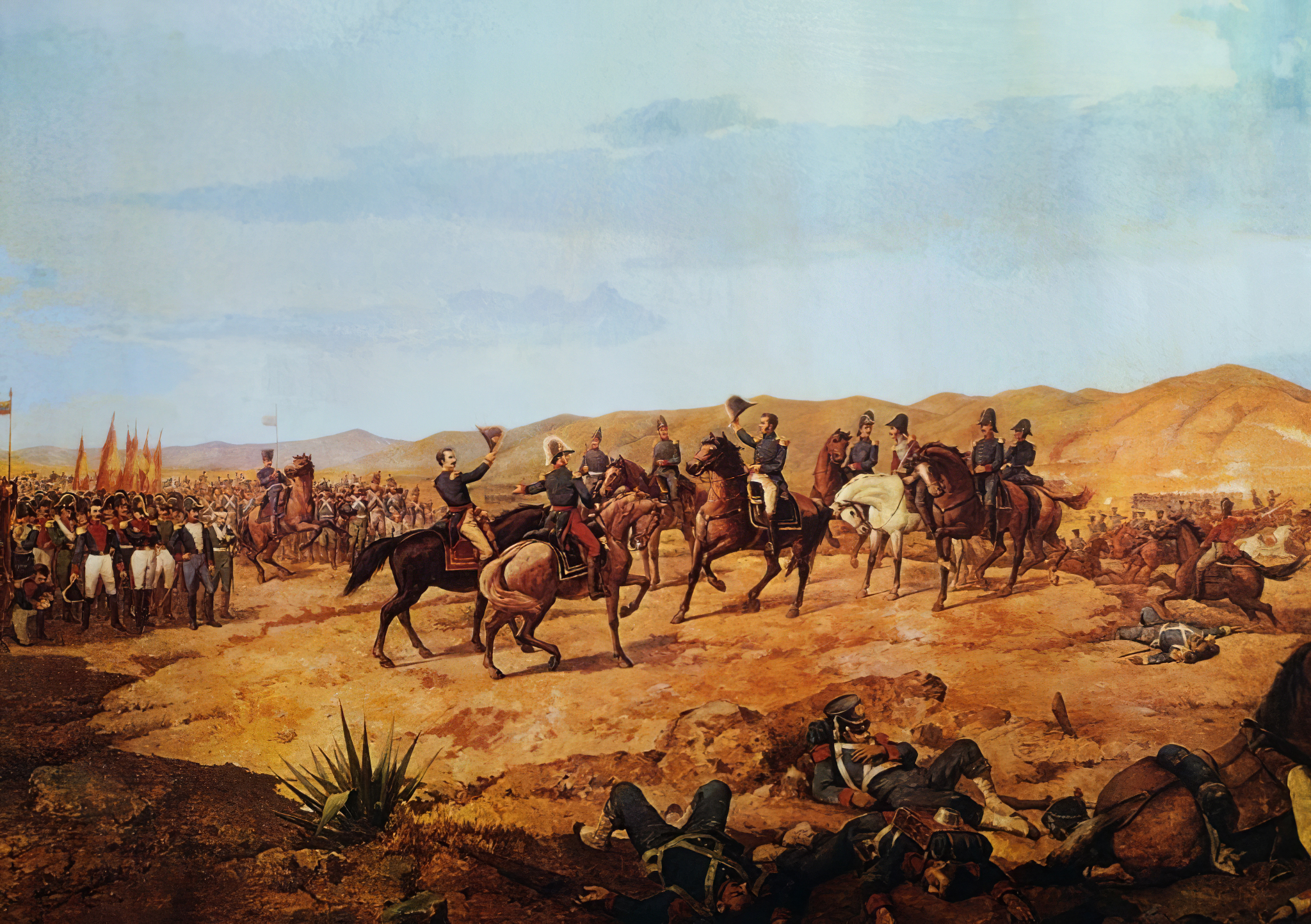
The Battle of Ayacucho, December 9, 1824, ended the wars of independence in South America.

In the Spanish territories of America, the news of 1808 caused a social mobilization similar only in part to that which occurred on the Peninsula. The lack of power was also filled by local Juntas, which also drifted towards more and more revolutionary positions. In their case, characterized by the increasingly obvious independence of the social group of Creoles, which culminated in declarations of independence. The reception of the American deputies in the Cortes of Cadiz, who conceived of the Spanish nation defined in the Constitution as the gathering of Spaniards from both hemispheres, did not represent a sufficiently attractive offer to prevent the independence movements, supported by England, from following the example of the previous emancipations of the United States and Haiti, refusing any kind of intermediate solution other than absolute independence. The military imposition of the Spanish authority on the pro-independence nuclei was not solid enough, especially after Rafael del Riego's pronouncement in Cabezas de San Juan (January 1820), which diverted towards the internal peninsular conflict the troops planned to be embarked to America. The campaigns of Simón Bolívar from Venezuela and José de San Martín from Argentina cornered the last Spanish troops in the central Andes, which were definitively defeated in the battle of Ayacucho (December 9, 1824). The independence of Mexico and Central America took place autonomously and relatively peacefully, establishing the personal mandate, with the title of Emperor, of Agustín de Iturbide. Only Cuba and Puerto Rico, in addition to the Philippines, remained subject to the metropolis, a situation that would last until 1898.

== Reign of Ferdinand VII (1814–1833) ==
=== Absolutist Sexennium (1814–1820) ===
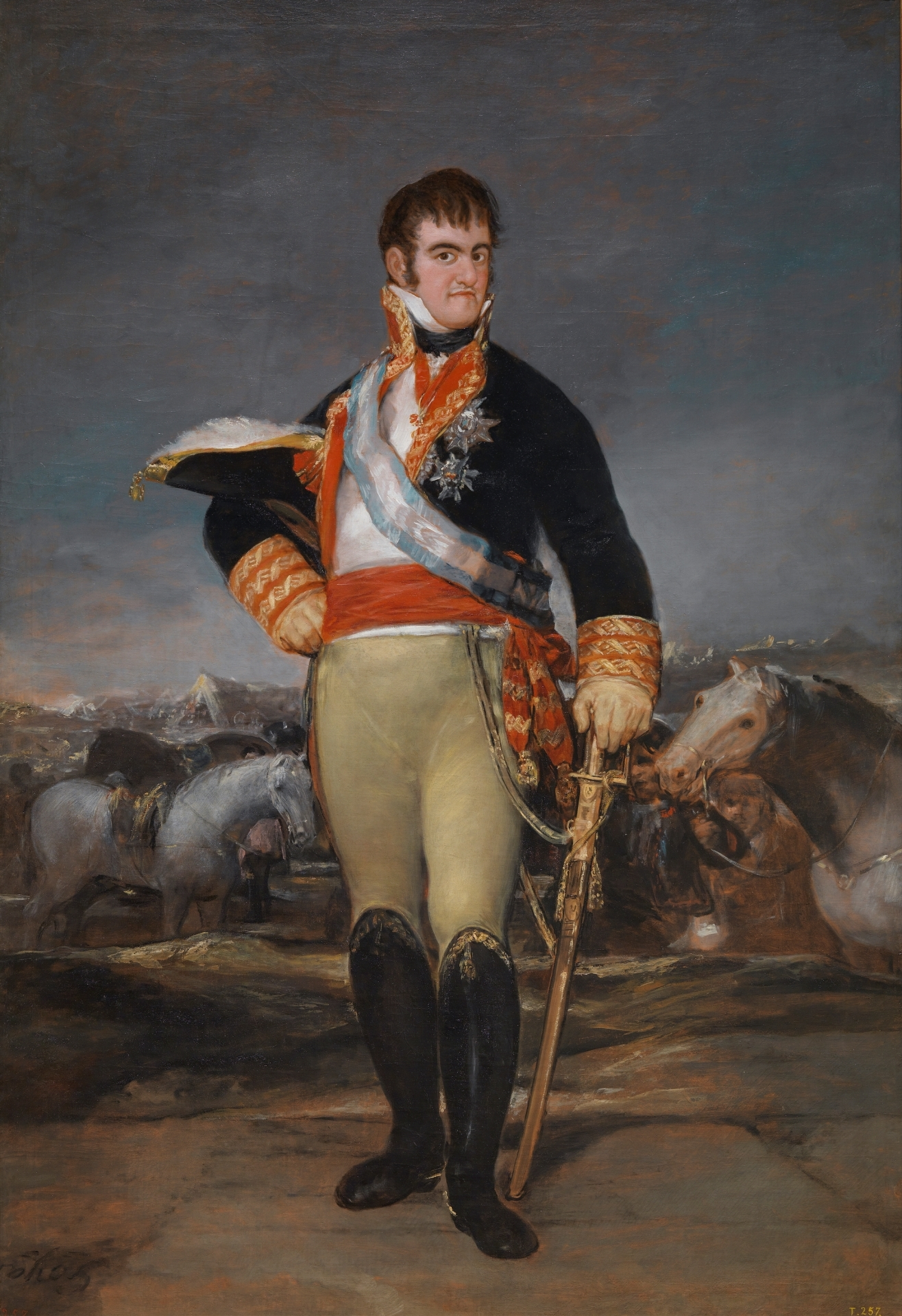
Portrait of Ferdinand VII, by Goya, Museo del Prado.

The liberation of Ferdinand VII by Napoleon (Treaty of Valençay, December 11, 1813) meant the non-continuation of hostilities on the part of Spain, which meant the loss of all British support for the future. In the internal part of the country, the absolutists (or servile, as they were called by the liberals) were ideologically configured around a document: the Manifesto of the Persians, which requested the king to restore the institutional and socio-political situation prior to 1808. There was even a spontaneous reception of the king by the people, who unhitched the horses from their carriage to pull it by themselves, to the cry of Long live the chains! Receptive to these ideas, Ferdinand refused to recognize any validity to the Constitution or the Cadiz legislation, and exercised power without any limits. He began an active political persecution, both of the liberals (no matter how much they were fernandinos) and of the afrancesados.

Nor were the military spared from the purge, as the king was aware that he could not trust the majority of an army that was no longer the stereotyped institution of the Ancien Régime, but formed mostly by young men promoted by war merits, second sons who in other circumstances would have become clergymen, or even former clergymen who had hung up their habits, or guerrillas of any social origin. Many of those who did not go into exile were imprisoned, banished or lost their posts (such as El Empecinado). More reliability for social control was expected from a reestablished institution: the Inquisition.

The only possibility of resuming the liberal revolutionary process was the military pronunciamiento, which was repeatedly attempted, always unsuccessfully, leading to new exiles (Espoz y Mina). Juan Díaz Porlier, Joaquín Vidal or Luis Lacy y Gautier died in action, or were arrested and shot.

The restored privileges of the nobility and clergy aggravated the bankruptcy of the fiscal system, made chronic by the interest on the debt and impossible to balance by the loss of American revenues. Under pressure from the United States, the king obtained some financial resources from the sale of the Floridas, which were used to purchase from the Russian Tsar Alexander I a fleet of ships to transport an army to America. The delays resulting from the poor condition of these ships (some of them were not fit to sail again) were among the reasons why the accumulation of troops stationed around Cadiz became more and more politically dangerous.

=== Trienio Liberal (1820–1823) ===
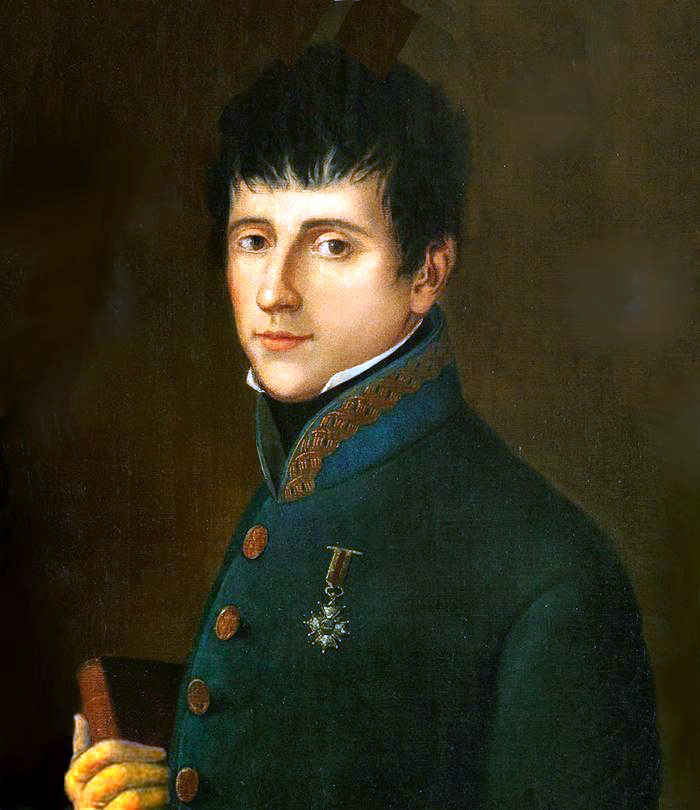
Rafael del Riego

The expeditionary army did not leave to quell the American revolution, but on January 1, 1820, became a revolutionary army itself, in the name of the Constitution and under the orders of Colonel Riego. After an eventful journey, the news of the rebellion managed to summon the adhesion of the cities organized again in Juntas; while the king was reduced to inaction due to the lack of military men willing to support him. Finally he swore the Constitution of Cadiz with the famous phrase "Let us march frankly, and I am the first, along the constitutional path". The evidence of the insincerity of such an oath was reflected in the lyrics of the Trágala, a satirical song turned into a liberal anthem.

During the Triennium the Patriotic Societies and the press sought the extension of liberal concepts; while the Cortes, elected by the system of indirect universal suffrage, reinstated the Cádiz legislation (abolition of lordships and entailed estates, confiscation, closure of convents, suppression of half of the tithe), and exercised the key role given to them by the Constitution of 1812 in the name of national sovereignty, without taking into account the will of a king from whom they could not expect any institutional collaboration. The political division in the institutional space was established between the doceañistas or moderate liberals, in favor of the continuity of the current Constitution, even if that meant maintaining a balance of powers with the king); and the veinteañistas or exalted liberals, in favor of drafting a new constitution that would further accentuate the predominance of the legislature, and of taking the reforms to their maximum degree of revolutionary transformation (some of them, in the minority, were avowedly republican). The initial governments were formed by the moderates (Evaristo Pérez de Castro, Eusebio Bardají Azara, José Gabriel de Silva-Bazán —Marquess of Santa Cruz—, and Francisco Martínez de la Rosa). After the second elections, which took place in March 1822, the new Cortes, presided over by Riego, were clearly dominated by the exalted. In July of that same year, a maneuver of the king took place to redirect the political situation in his favor, using the discontent of a related military body (uprising of the Royal Guard), which was neutralized by the National Militia in a confrontation in the Plaza Mayor of Madrid (July 7). An exalted government was then formed, headed by Evaristo Fernández de San Miguel (August 6).

The brevity of the period meant that most of the legislation of the triennium did not come into effect (the law for the sale of realengos and baldíos for the peasants, the new proportional fiscal system, etc.). Only issues such as the articulation of the national market, eliminating internal customs and establishing a strong agrarian protectionism, had some continuity. Also the new provincial division, which, however, did not become effective until 1833

The influence of the events in Spain was transcendental in Europe, especially in Portugal and Italy (where similar revolutions were unleashed, based on the conspiratorial model of secret societies and the protagonism of young military men, who even took the text of the Constitution of Cadiz as a model), in such a way that historiography calls the whole process the revolution of 1820.

The absolutist reaction in the country was manifested in the determined resistance of a good part of the clergy (especially the high clergy and the regular clergy); they supported groups of peasants dispossessed of land and promoted conspiracies, with the obvious support of the king (the so-called Regency of Urgel). However, the decisive force came from outside: the legitimist and reactionary Europe of the Restoration or the Congress of Vienna, a firm supporter of interventionism, could not consent to the revolutionary contagion. The powers of the Holy Alliance, gathered at the Congress of Verona (November 22, 1822) entrusted a French army (which received the name of the Hundred Thousand Sons of St. Louis) to reestablish the absolute power of the legitimate king.

=== Ominous Decade (1823–1833) ===
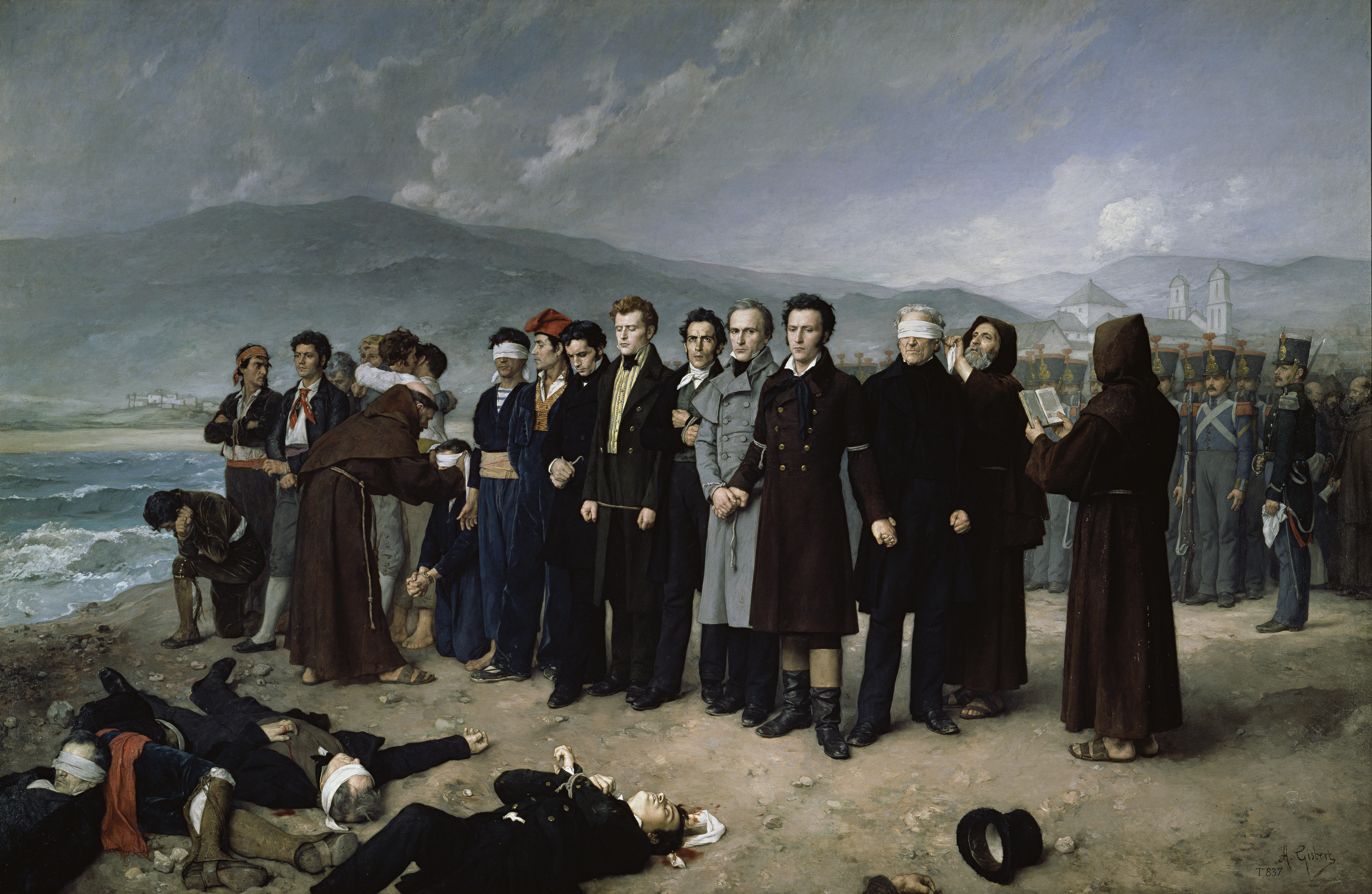
Execution of Torrijos and his Companions on the Beach at Málaga, oil painting by Antonio Gisbert. Museo del Prado.

The return of absolutism brought with it a return to political repression of the liberals. The political police was created, Rafael de Riego was hanged and another new wave of exiles left the country. The liberal military again resorted to secret societies, conspiracies and pronunciamientos, which again resulted in failures and executions (El Empecinado, Torrijos, Mariana Pineda, etc.). The reports required by the police gave rise to sordid characters, such as the Madrilenian Tía Cotilla.

Nevertheless, in spite of the historiographical denomination (as a result of the experiences of the affected ones), the repressive intensity of the ominous one was smaller than during the absolutist sexennium; and even the relaxation of the repression became evident as the end of the period approached, when the evidence that there would be no male successor (even when after three sterile marriages the king managed to have offspring, it was a daughter, Isabel, born in 1830) caused a good part of the court, around Queen Maria Christina and the less reactionary aristocrats, to pressure the king, increasingly weaker, to repeal the Salic law that prevented female succession. The most absolutist elements of the nobility and clergy rallied around the king's brother, Carlos María Isidro, who, if the Salic Law remained in force, would be the heir to the throne. The Christinos saw in the approach to the more moderate elements among the liberals the most plausible move, and they were attracting them with measures such as the amnesty of 1832–1833, which allowed many to return from exile. In the meantime, the Carlists were evaluating the insurrectional way out (Guerra dels Malcontents) preluded by the activity, in especially favorable rural areas, of groups such as the Apostolics.

The absolutist camarilla (the group close to the royal chamber, which was subjected to a reverse selection mechanism) found itself incapable of solving the pressing fiscal situation, especially at that time, having lost the income from the colonies. There was no choice but to resort to enlightened politicians. Their technical activity gave rise to the mining law, protectionist tariffs for industry, the promulgation of the Code of Commerce (1829) and the provincial division of Javier de Burgos (1833). The timid economic transformations were practically leading the way to liberalism. Nor could the absolutists count on external support: the revolution of 1830 had established in France a bourgeois monarchy (that of Louis Philippe).

== Reign of Isabella II (1833–1868) ==
=== Regencies (1833–1843) ===
==== Regency of Maria Christina (1833–1840) and first Carlist war ====
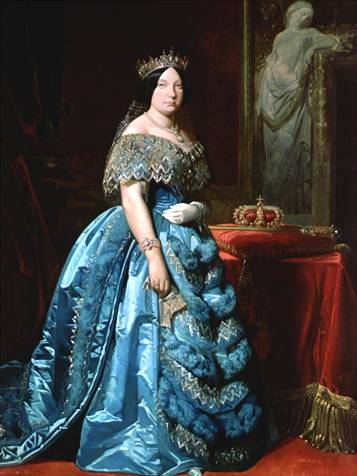
Isabella II, by Federico de Madrazo y Kuntz.

First Carlist war (1833–1840) Areas of greater Carlist intensity Areas with Carlist sympathizers. Main Carlist sieges. Liberal centers of the north. Main Carlist centers. Battles

On September 29, 1833, the daughter of Fernando VII, Isabella II, inherited the crown before she was three years old, under the regency of her mother Maria Christina. The refusal to accept the succession by the Carlists started a real civil war in which the two sides drew an ideological and social fracture: on one side, the supporters of the Old Regime, which roughly were most of the clergy, and much of the lower nobility and peasants of the northern half of Spain; on the other, the supporters of the New Regime, which roughly were the middle classes and the urban plebs (led by the most politically aware: some 13,000 exiles who were allowed to return by a new amnesty, numerous prisoners who were released, the new local leaders who emerged from the November municipal elections, and most of the army officers, who were allowed access to key command posts). The aristocracy was divided according to criteria of opportunity, establishment in the territory and position in the court. Many families were painfully divided, and in extensive areas the confrontation was geographically evident as the cities, where the national liberal militias were organized and recruited, were surrounded by a countryside where Carlist parties were armed (the royalist volunteers had been dissolved). The popular mobilization seemed to recall, on both sides, that of 1808, in one case with a clearly revolutionary spirit, in the other clearly reactionary.

In the court, the governments of more or less liberal sign (Cea Bermúdez —moderate absolutist—, Martínez de la Rosa —moderate liberal—, Mendizábal, Istúriz and Calatrava —progressive liberals—, who inaugurated the title of President of the Council of Ministers of Spain —previously the Secretary of State was used—) did not achieve a decisive victory in the war and faced serious financial difficulties, which could not be solved until the ecclesiastical confiscation or Mendizábal's confiscation, a transcendental decision: at the same time that it deprived the main social and ideological enemy of the New Regime (the clergy) of economic resources, it built a new social class of agricultural landowners of varied social origin —nobles, bourgeois or wealthy peasants, who in the southern half of Spain formed a true landowning oligarchy— who owed their fortune to it; and by accepting public debt securities as a means of payment in the auctions, it revalued the public debt and allowed the restoration of international credit and the sustainability of the treasury (guaranteed in the future by the contributions to be paid for those lands, previously exempt from taxation and now freed from the mortmain that kept them away from the market). The abolition of the seigneurial regime did not mean (as had happened during the French Revolution with the historic decree abolishing feudalism on August 4, 1789) a social revolution that gave property to the peasants. In the case of the secular lords, the confusing distinction between ancestral and jurisdictional seigneurials, of very remote origin and impossible to verify titles, ended up leading to a massive judicial recognition of full ownership of the former lords, who only saw their legal situation altered and were left unprotected in the free market by the disappearance of the institution of the mayorazgo (that is, they were free to sell or bequeath at will, but also exposed to losing their property in case of mismanagement).

Anticlericalism became a social force of growing importance, manifested violently after the massacre of friars in Madrid in 1834 (July 17, during a cholera epidemic, rumors spread that it was due to the poisoning of the fountains). The following year (1835) there was a generalized burning of convents in various parts of Spain. The anti-liberal repression carried out by the Carlist side went to extremes with reprisals of great violence (Ramón Cabrera, the Tiger of Maestrazgo).

Institutionally, it was governed according to a granted charter: the Royal Statute of 1834, which neither recognized national sovereignty nor rights or liberties recognized by themselves, but granted by royal will, and which introduced strong mechanisms of control of popular representation (bicameralism, indirect elections with very restricted census suffrage for the Estamento de Procuradores —0.15% of the population— and a Estamento de Próceres with ex officio members of the aristocracy and the high clergy).

The text remained in force until the mutiny of the sergeants of La Granja (August 12, 1836) forced the Queen Regent to reinstate the Constitution of 1812. The following year the situation was redirected with a more conservative text: the Spanish Constitution of 1837 that, although based on the revolutionary principle of national sovereignty, established a balance of powers between the Cortes and the Crown in favor of the latter, and maintained bicameralism (with the new names of Congress and Senate). The electoral system, although it introduced direct elections for the first time, continued to favor the richest (a census suffrage only slightly expanded: 257,908 voters, 2.2% of the population). Confessionalism was replaced by the recognition of the obligation to maintain the worship and ministers of the Catholic religion professed by Spaniards. At that moment the split between moderate liberals (many of them former exalted of the triennium, evolved towards the moderantismo) like the count of Toreno, Alcalá Galiano and general Narváez, who enjoyed the confidence of the Regent and formed government until 1840 (Evaristo Pérez de Castro); and progressives like Mendizábal, Olózaga and general Espartero (marginalized of that confidence, but whose political and military support continued being decisive) took place in that moment.

When the Carlists were left without international support and without resources, General Maroto agreed to negotiate peace with Espartero (the Convention of Vergara, August 31, 1839), giving the Carlist officers the possibility of integrating into the national army. Most of the Carlist nobility came to accept, with greater or lesser pleasure, the new situation. Another defining circumstance of the New Regime, the political centralism in the face of the Carlist recognition of the fueros, was mitigated for the Basque Provinces and Navarre (the law of October 25, 1839, instead of abolishing the fueros, confirmed them without prejudice to the constitutional unity of the Monarchy). The Carlist nucleus of Morella (Ramón Cabrera) held out for several more months (May 30, 1840).

Maria Christina's situation in the regency was compromised from the very beginning in 1833 by the secret marriage she contracted, shortly after being widowed, with a military man of the court (Agustín Fernando Muñoz y Sánchez, who was ennobled as Duke of Riánsares) and had eight children. The prestige and control over the army that General Espartero had achieved put him in a key position to become an alternative of power. The attempts to win him over through ennoblement, and even naming him president of the Council of Ministers, did not avoid the deep disagreements between the general and the regent, especially about the role of the National Militia and the autonomy of the town councils; a matter that provoked the resignation of Espartero (June 15). Successive uprisings against Maria Christina in the most important cities finally forced her to abdicate, renouncing the exercise of the regency and the custody of her daughters, including Queen Isabella, in favor of the general (October 12, 1840).

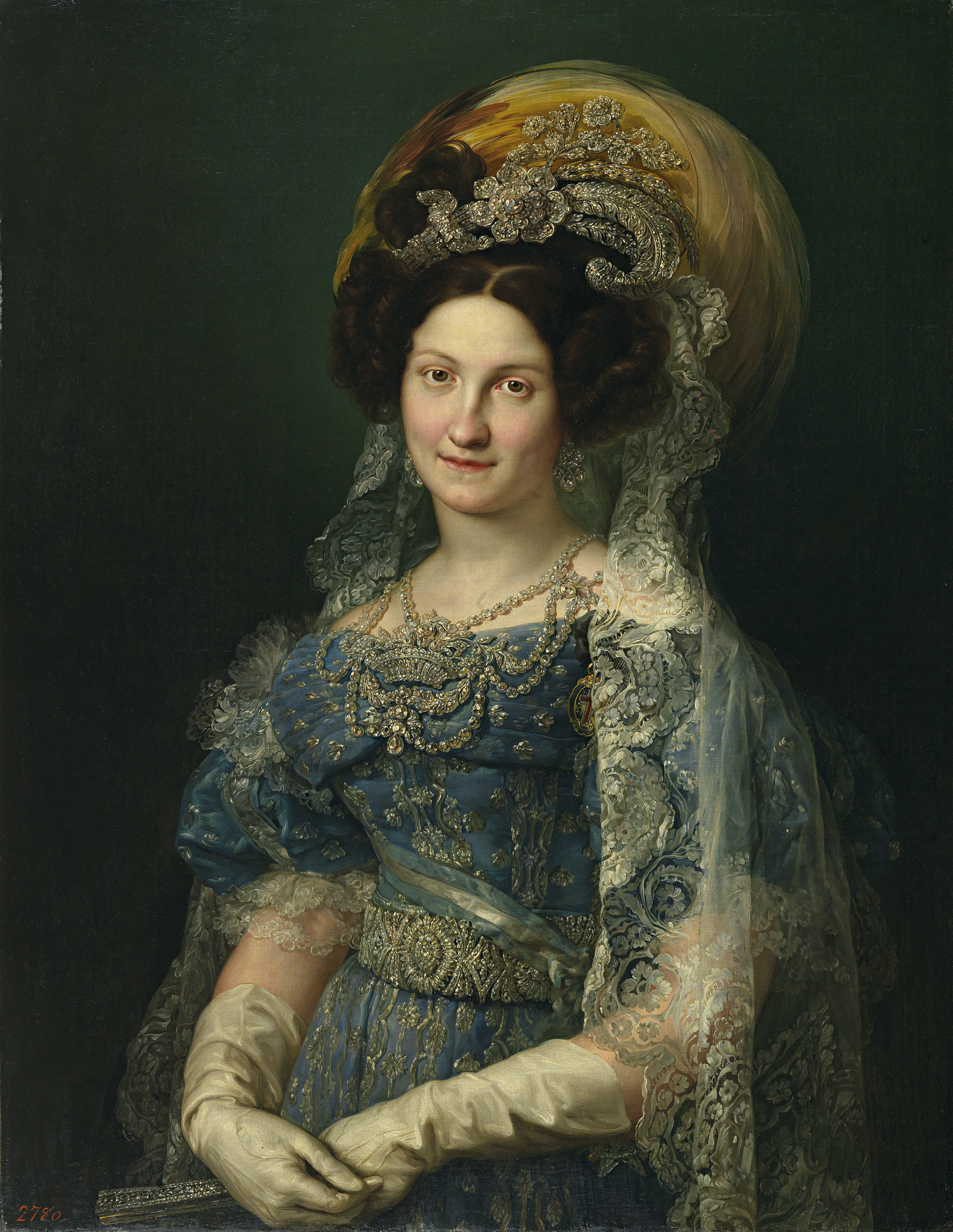
The queen regent Maria Christina de Borbón

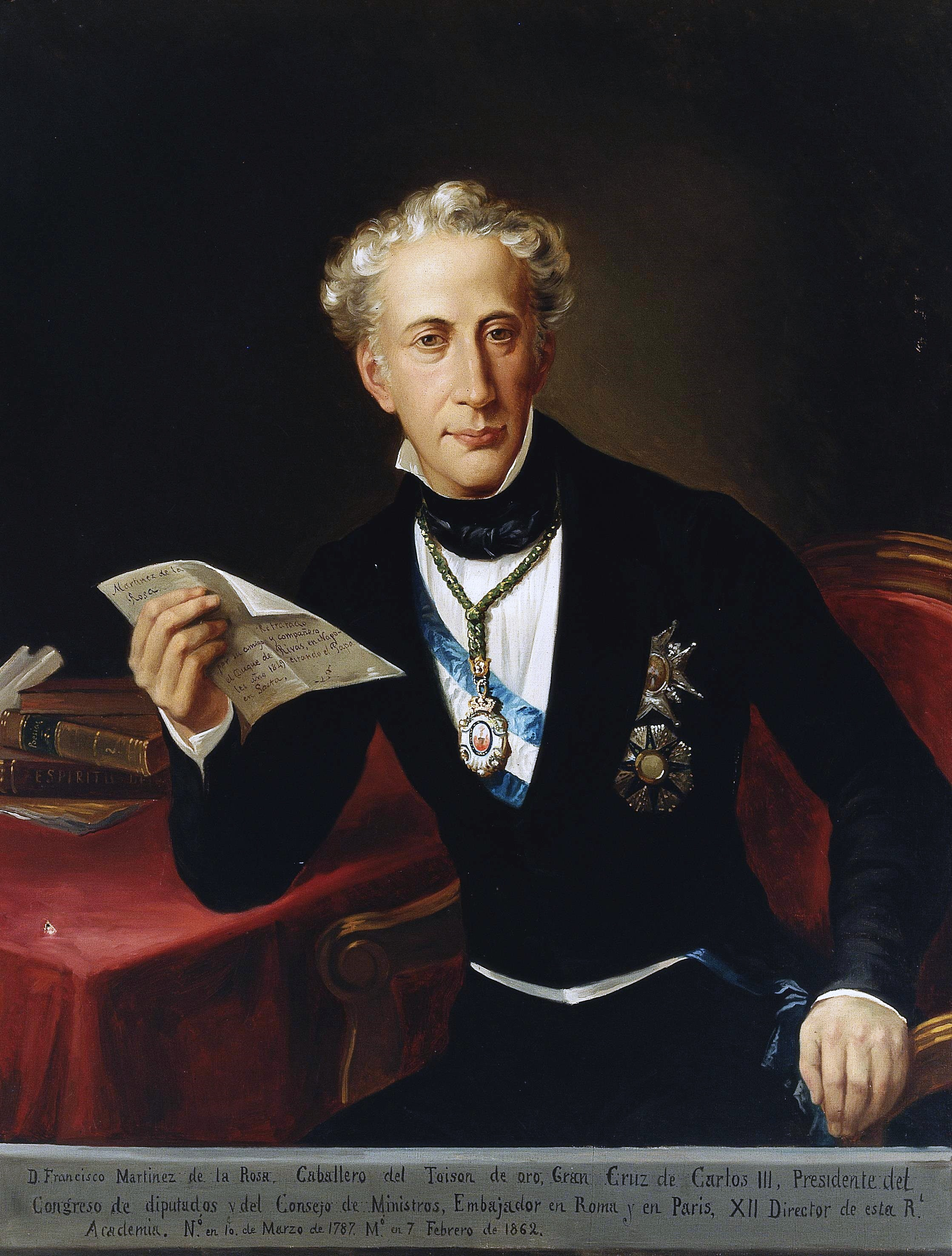
Francisco Martínez de la Rosa, nicknamed Rosita la pastelera for his attempt to reconcile liberalism with aristocratic interests

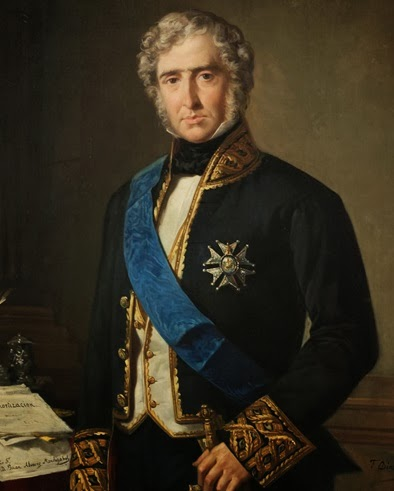
Juan Álvarez Mendizábal, the driving force behind the ecclesiastical confiscation

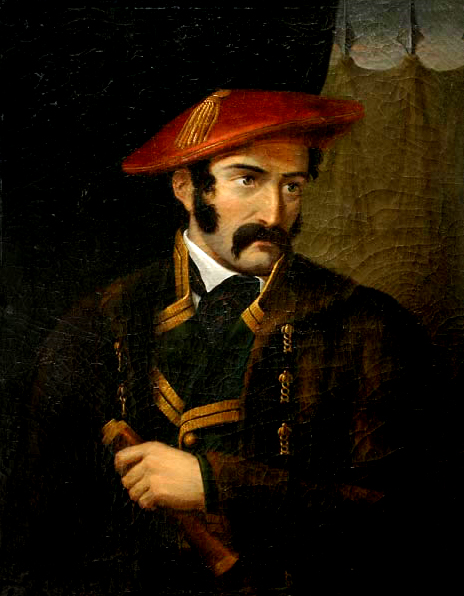
Tomás de Zumalacárregui, the main Carlist general until his death in 1835.

===== Spanish romanticism =====
The intellectuals (many of them with political concerns, having returned from an exile rich in influences) implanted the new romantic taste, which extended to poetry (José de Espronceda), to the theater (the Duke of Rivas) and to a press whose survival was threatened by censorship and economic precariousness. Among the many figures of journalism were Alberto Lista, Manuel Bretón de los Herreros, Serafín Estébanez Calderón, Juan Nicasio Gallego, Antonio Ros de Olano, Ramón Mesonero Romanos and the columnist Mariano José de Larra, who managed to capture daily life and the most serious issues in concise expressions, which have become widespread clichés (Vuelva usted mañana, Escribir en Madrid es llorar, Aquí yace media España, murió de la otra media). The burial of Larra (who committed suicide on January 13, 1837) meant the passing of the baton of Spanish romanticism to the young José Zorrilla.

==== Regency of Espartero (1840–1843) ====
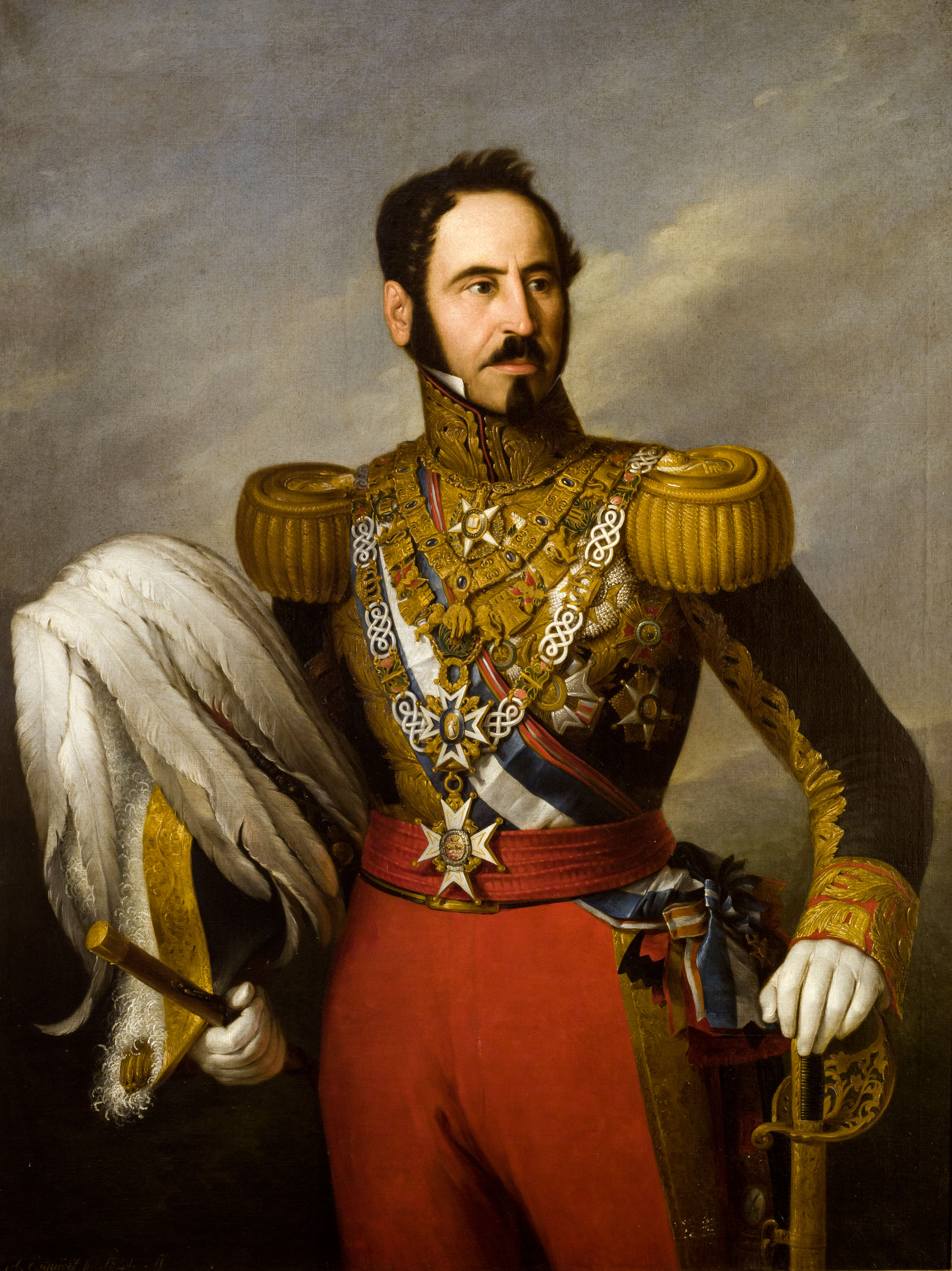
Baldomero Espartero

The regency was confirmed to Espartero by a vote of the Cortes (March 8, 1841), which also considered the possibility of granting it to other candidates, or to a terna.

The progressive governments proceeded to apply the law of confiscation of the secular clergy, guaranteeing on the part of the State the maintenance of the parishes and seminaries. An attempt was made to design a national educational system in which the Church did not play a predominant role, but given the lack of means, the implementation of an educational system worthy of the name was not achieved until the second half of the century, already under moderate and neo-Catholic budgets. The formation of citizens and the construction of a national history (through the sponsorship of genres such as history painting) were seen as one of the main demands of the construction of the liberal state.

The compromise reached in Vergara with the Basque fueros was broken with the law of October 29, 1841, which abolished them in their entirety.

Efforts were made to encourage economic activity by applying free trade principles, which attracted foreign capital investment (mainly English, French and Belgian) in sectors such as mining and finance. The new inequalities gave rise to the so-called social question. The emerging Catalan textile industry, that had already witnessed the emergence of workers' mobilizations (the Bonaplata brothers' El Vapor factory, inaugurated in 1832, had already suffered a Luddite attack in 1835 —coinciding with the burning of convents—); while continuing its process of technological modernization (reception of the self-actins, which would later cause conflicts), it now hosted the main supporters of the most radical part of progressive liberalism (the future democrats and republicans, not yet presented with those denominations). The protectionist interests of both employers and workers turned Barcelona into a focus of protests against Espartero, which led to an uprising. The regent opted for the most violent repression, bombing the city on December 3, 1842, and subsequently executing the leaders of the revolt.

A person I know affirms, as a law of Spanish history, the need to bomb Barcelona every fifty years. This boutade denotes a whole political program. Manuel Azaña, quoting a cliché attributed to Espartero himself.

The hostility of politicians and military men (Manuel Cortina, Joaquín María López, General Juan Prim), who rejected his expeditious way of resolving not only this conflict but all political life (he had dissolved the Cortes and governed in a practically dictatorial manner) left him increasingly isolated. The elections gave the victory to the progressive faction of Salustiano Olózaga, very critical of Espartero, and he contested them. On June 11, a joint military coup of moderate and progressive swordsmen (some of them from exile, for having been protagonists of previous pronunciamientos: Narváez, O'Donnell, Serrano and Prim), obtained the support of most of the army, even of the troops sent by Espartero himself to fight them (Torrejón de Ardoz, July 22); with which the regent was forced to go into exile in England, the main beneficiary of his economic policy (July 30, 1843).

=== Isabel II's coming of age (1843–1868) ===
The problem of renewing the regency was obviated by deciding that Isabel could be declared of age (November 10, 1843) and exercise her functions by herself; which immediately proved to be in full harmony with moderantism, after a period of parliamentary intrigues led by the progressive Salustiano Olózaga and Luis González Bravo (passed to the moderate ranks), which ended with the triumph of the latter and the exile of Olózaga. There was even a failed progressive military pronunciamiento (the Boné Rebellion, in Alicante, from January to March 1844).

==== Década moderada (1844–1854) ====
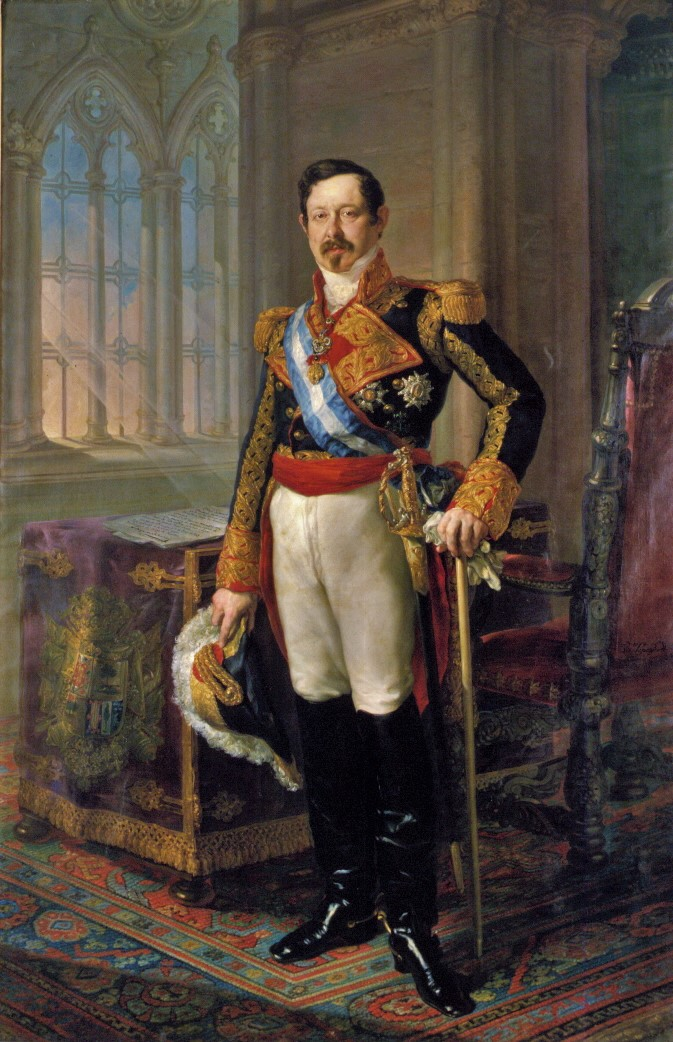
Ramón María Narváez y Campos, by Vicente López.

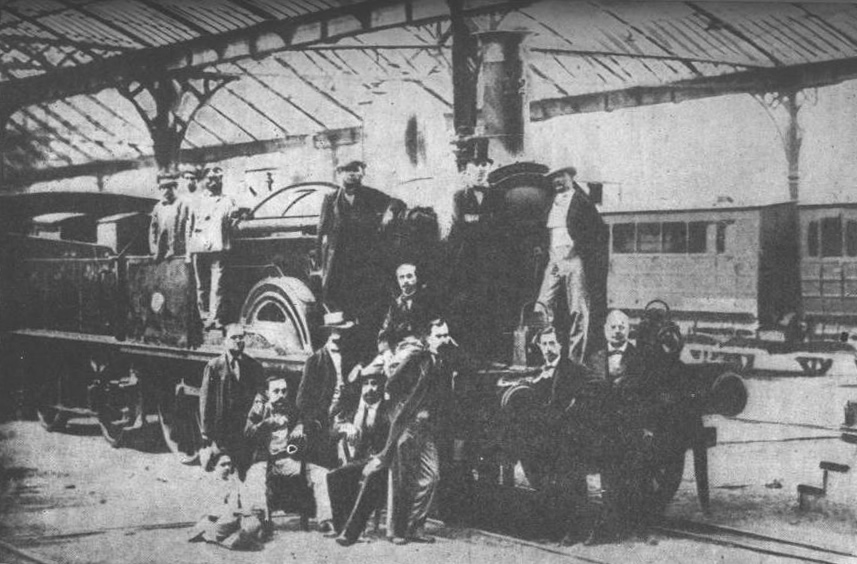
Barcelona-Mataró Railroad, 1848.

General Ramón Narváez was left as leader of the moderate party and assumed the presidency of the Council of Ministers (May 3, 1844), beginning an era of political stability in which the progressives were relegated to the opposition with no possibility of gaining access to the positions of power that were negotiated in the palace camarillas.

On May 13, 1844, the Civil Guard was created, a military body deployed in the territory in barracks to guarantee order and law, especially in rural areas; it was clearly a counter-figure of the National Militia.

On July 4, 1844, the abolition of the Basque and Navarrese fueros carried out by Espartero was reviewed and partially restored, although not in matters such as the foral pass, internal customs or electoral procedures.

The 1845 Town Councils Law of 1845 strongly restricted municipal autonomy in favor of centralism, granting the government the appointment of mayors. The same year the Constitution of 1845 was promulgated, very similar to that of 1837 (60 of the 77 articles were identical), but reformed in a sense more in line with doctrinaire liberalism. Instead of national sovereignty, it established shared sovereignty between the Cortes and the King, with preeminence of the latter, who could summon and dissolve the Chambers without limitations. The Catholic confessionality of the State was confirmed. It regulated the rights of the citizen, which were strongly restricted, such as the freedom of expression limited by censorship (a crucial issue in view of the vitality that the press had reached in Spain). The National Militia disappeared. The electoral system, which was established by the Electoral Law of 1846, continued to be a strongly oligarchic census suffrage, limiting even more the right to vote, restricted to 97,000 electors (men over 25 years of age who exceeded a certain level of income, higher than what had been foreseen until then), 0.8% of the total population. The government of Juan Bravo Murillo tried to pass an even more restrictive constitution (text published in the Gaceta de Madrid on December 2, 1852), but the strong opposition expressed by all the parliamentary arc made the queen give up the project and forced Bravo Murillo to resign.

The Concordat of 1851 reestablished good relations with the Holy See. The pope recognized Isabella II as queen (distinguishing her with the Golden Rose, the main papal decoration) and accepted the loss of the ecclesiastical goods already disentailed, calming the consciences of their buyers. In exchange, the Spanish State committed itself to maintain the cult and clergy budget with which the needs of the secular clergy would be covered; as well as to guarantee the catholicity of teaching, in which the Church would have a decisive role, and in the censorship of publications. The court of Isabella II became a true court of miracles because of the ascendancy that some religious reached over the queen (St. Anthony Mary Claret and Sor Patrocinio, the nun of the wounds). The confluence of the Catholic and traditionalist intelligentsia with moderantism gave rise to the neo-Catholic movement (Marquess of Viluma, Donoso Cortés, Jaime Balmes).

Political corruption included prominent financiers (the Marquess of Salamanca) and a growing royal family (that of the queen and her consort —her cousin Francisco de Asís de Borbón—, that of her mother and stepfather —the expelled Maria Christina and her morganatic husband, who were allowed to return in 1844—, and that of the Montpensiers —sister and brother-in-law of the queen—, married on the same day as her in a lavish royal double wedding and installed in Spain since their expulsion from France on the occasion of the revolution of 1848—), accompanied the timid take-off of Spanish capitalism; while public finances were put in order with the tax reform of 1845 (known, by the name of its promoters, as the Mon-Santillán tax reform). Rather than a failed Spanish industrial revolution, economic growth was centered, in the absence of national capital, on banking and financial companies sustained by natural sources of wealth (the growth of cultivated land and the exploitation of numerous mines) and a nascent railway network, all with extensive foreign participation in the midst of resounding scandals, which facilitated the return to power of the progressives.

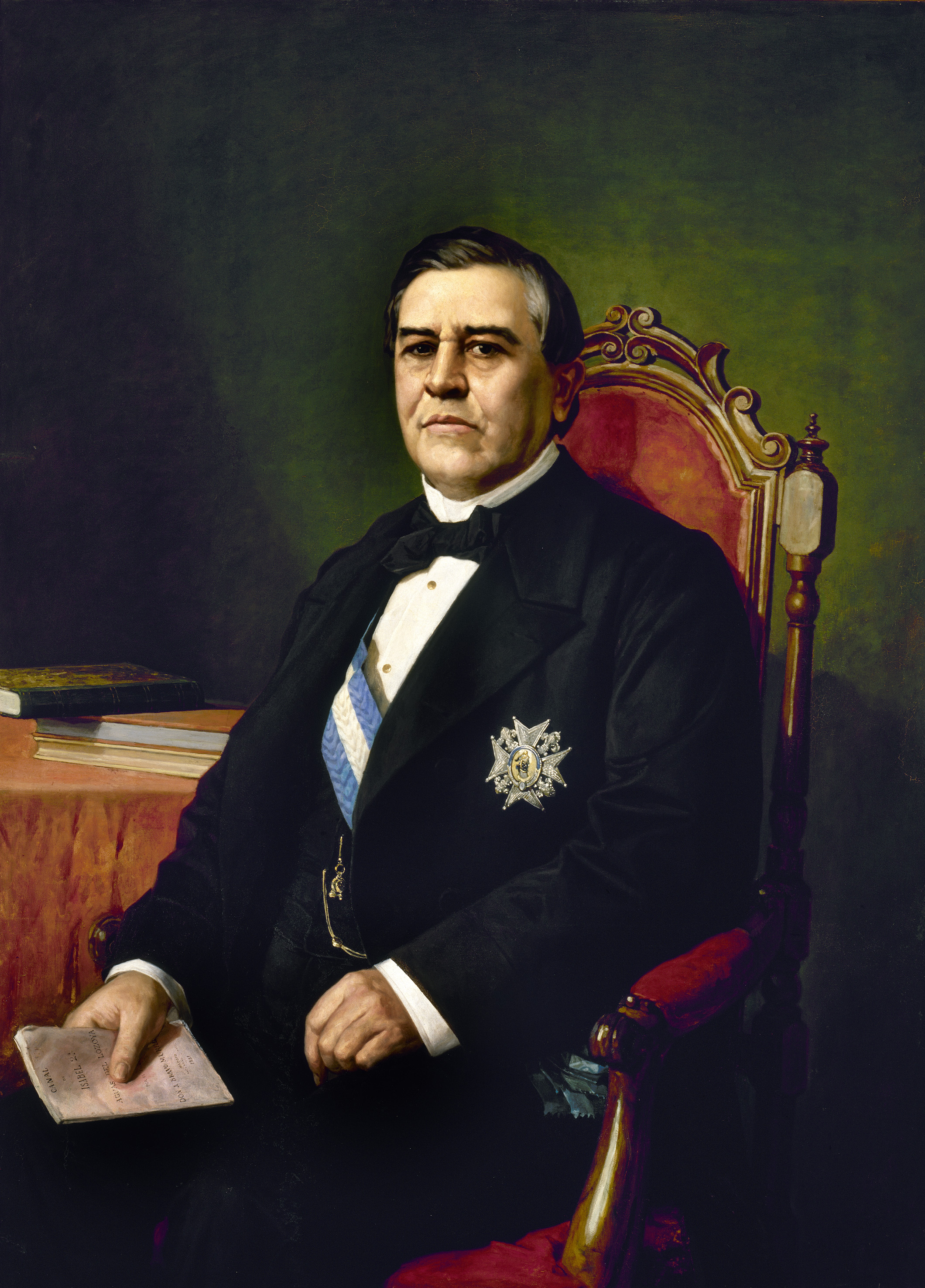
Juan Bravo Murillo

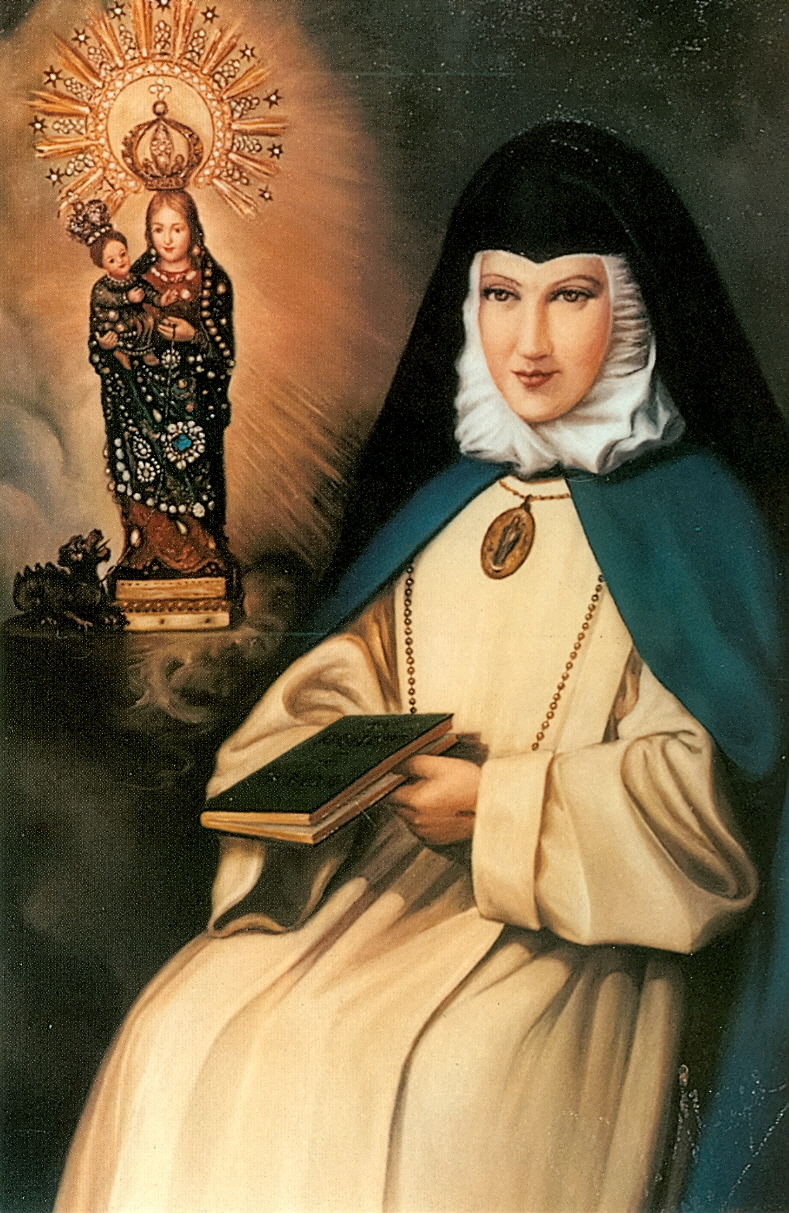
Sor Patrocinio the nun of the wounds

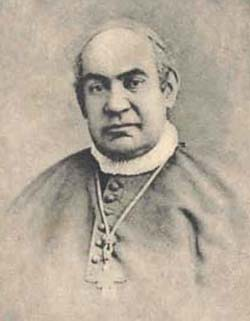
Saint Anthony Mary Claret

==== Bienio progresista (1854–1856) ====
The authoritarianism of Narváez, and the impossibility of counteracting it by institutional means, pushed the opposition to the military solution: a pronunciamiento carried out by general Leopoldo O'Donnell in Vicálvaro (the Vicalvarada, June 28, 1854). The initial failure led O'Donnell to retreat to the south, where he contacted General Serrano, with whom he proclaimed the Manzanares Manifesto (drafted by Antonio Cánovas del Castillo, July 7), providing the movement with a political program and obtaining the great popular support it demanded, which precipitated its triumph.

We want the conservation of the throne, but without a chamber that dishonors it; we want the rigorous practice of the fundamental laws, improving them, especially the electoral and printing laws; we want the reduction of taxes, based on a strict economy; We want seniority and merit to be respected in military and civilian jobs; we want to wrest the towns from the centralization that consumes them, giving them the local independence necessary for them to conserve and increase their own interests, and as a guarantee of all this we want and will propose, under solid foundations, the National Militia. The Juntas of government that must be constituted in the free provinces; the general Courts that will later meet; the nation itself, in short, will establish the definitive bases of the liberal regeneration to which we aspire. We have consecrated our swords to the national will, and we will not sheathe them until it is fulfilled.

The massive support of the army did not arrive until Espartero accepted to lead the initiative. The queen named him president of the council of ministers and a progressive chamber was formed.

O'Donnell created the Liberal Union, an eclectic party that sought to integrate moderates and progressives. The new constituent Parliament drafted a constitutional document that was neither approved nor entered into effect (what would have been the Constitution of 1856).

The most important activity of the progressive biennium consisted of its economic legislation: it sought to set the legality of capitalist development on track, closing the cycle of land privatizations with the Madoz confiscation law (May 3, 1855), which was applied, in addition to many ecclesiastical properties not yet affected, to the military orders and other institutions, fundamentally the propios and comunales (municipally owned lands whose lease was used to cover services rendered by the town councils or else were exploited in common by the inhabitants of the municipality); and legislation was passed on mines, finance and capital investments (creation of corporations). Madoz himself facilitated the demolition of the walls of Barcelona (a measure long demanded by the city council, which Espartero had opposed and was among the causes of the bombardment of 1842), allowing the expansion of the city (Cerdà Plan, 1860) as in other cities, which were shaping their urban development under the new hygienist principles of modern bourgeois neighborhoods (Castro Plan of Madrid, 1860, Canal de Isabel II, 1858). The loss of historical heritage involved in such demolitions and renovations, added to those of the confiscation, that had left thousands of religious buildings unprotected (including university buildings such as those in Alcalá); But it was assumed as a necessity of progress that easily silenced any voice of protest (such as that of the poet Gustavo Adolfo Bécquer or his brother the painter Valeriano Domínguez Bécquer and others —Valentín Carderera, Jenaro Pérez Villaamil— who undertook projects to preserve the memory of that world in danger of disappearing, at least in their images).

The railway system was organized and extended with some difficulty following a low-density radial scheme, with a center in Madrid and concessioned to large companies (Compañía de los Ferrocarriles de Madrid a Zaragoza y Alicante —the Rotschilds—; Compañía de los Caminos de Hierro del Norte de España —the Péreires—). In the following decades, industrialization had greater continuity, and the advantages of the integration of an incipient national market could be seen. The capitalist relations of production, both in the urban and rural areas, began to generate social conflicts of a new nature (the class struggle), and in the few industrial centers it was expressed in a nascent workers' movement that became aware of its opposition of interests with the owners of capital (mobilizations of 1855 in Barcelona (Note: On May 11 this petition to Espartero was written by the workers' societies (reproduced in veuobrera.org): The working class of Catalonia asks to be recognized the property of their work, the same as it is recognized to that of their masters the capitalists, wishes therefore in each of its individuals the absolute freedom to associate for cases in which enjoying health lacks work, for the same reason that is granted when having work lacks health: to be able to refuse the wage that he considers insufficient to his needs, and to the magnitude of his work and to ask for the, in his concept, just, (all peacefully and without the least violence), for the same reason that the capitalist can associate his capitals by refusing the wages in his concept high. The appointment of a mixed jury; that is to say, of masters and workers, to settle well and rightly the questions of wages between manufacturers and workmen... That the maximum number of hours of wages be fixed at ten, and that the premises of manufacturing establishments be subjected to inspection to see if they meet the necessary hygienic conditions; that the greatest possible number of free industrial schools be established, where the workers can learn the least violent, most useful and modern means to carry out their various operations and perhaps to found their inventions, and finally that asylum rooms be established for the children of the workers who, occupied in their work, find themselves in need of having them in their homes, and their parents should be forbidden to put them to work before the age of ten years, since the all too frequent misfortunes of their weakness and inexperience in the workshops would be avoided, they would achieve better physical development, and could take advantage of the industrial schools.) and Valladolid (Note: The conservative press accused the anarchists of the riots in Valladolid, which took the traditional form of subsistence riots. Faced with the tolerance shown by the National Militia towards the participants in the revolt, and pressured by O'Donnell himself, the minister of the interior, Patricio de la Escosura, resigned, despite having the confidence of President Espartero. The confrontation between both swordsmen ended with the intervention of the queen, who deposed Espartero and called O'Donnell to form a government. Jaime Prieto,)); while in the countryside it manifested itself in a similar way between the great mass of dispossessed day laborers and the new oligarchy of landowners. The connivance of interests between the Castilian-Andalusian landowning oligarchy, with an exporting tendency in the context of the weakness and disarticulation of the domestic market, and the opening to the exterior facilitated by a free trade policy that accepted foreign investments, was stimulated by a particularly favorable situation during the Crimean War (1853–1856): Water, sun and war in Sebastopol. (Note: The complete proverb, quoted and commented by Miguel de Unamuno: "For wine, water, sun and war in Sebastopol". That is to say, the motto of our economic system, win what someone else loses".) (Note: There are at least two other references by Unamuno to this proverb in other passages of his work:)

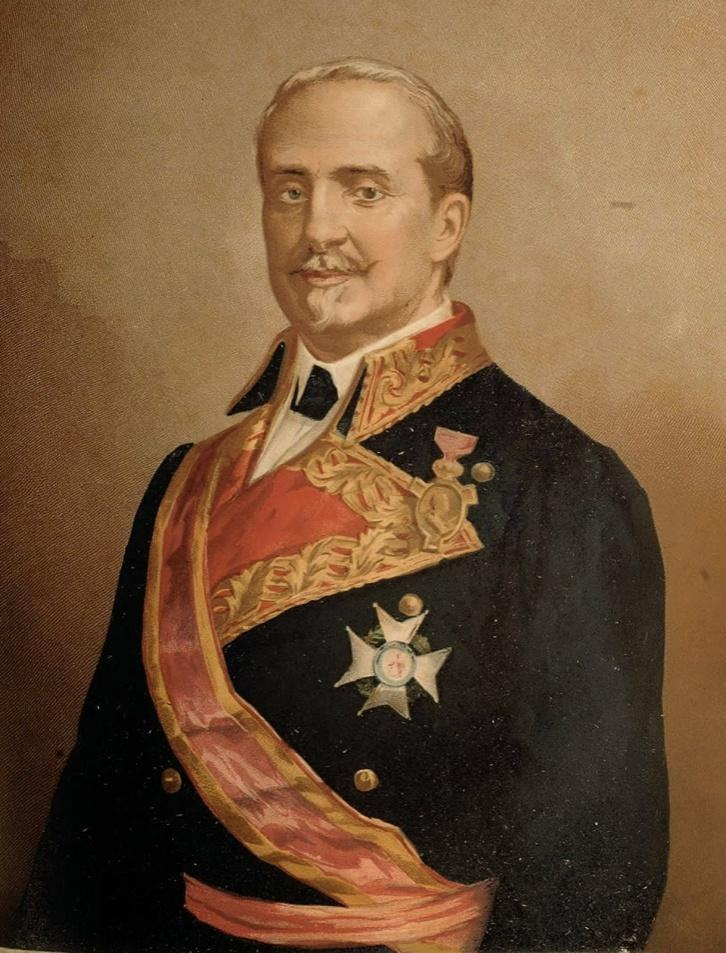
Leopoldo O'Donnell led the Vicálvaro pronunciamiento that removed the moderates from power. Later he would be at the head of the government of the Liberal Union.

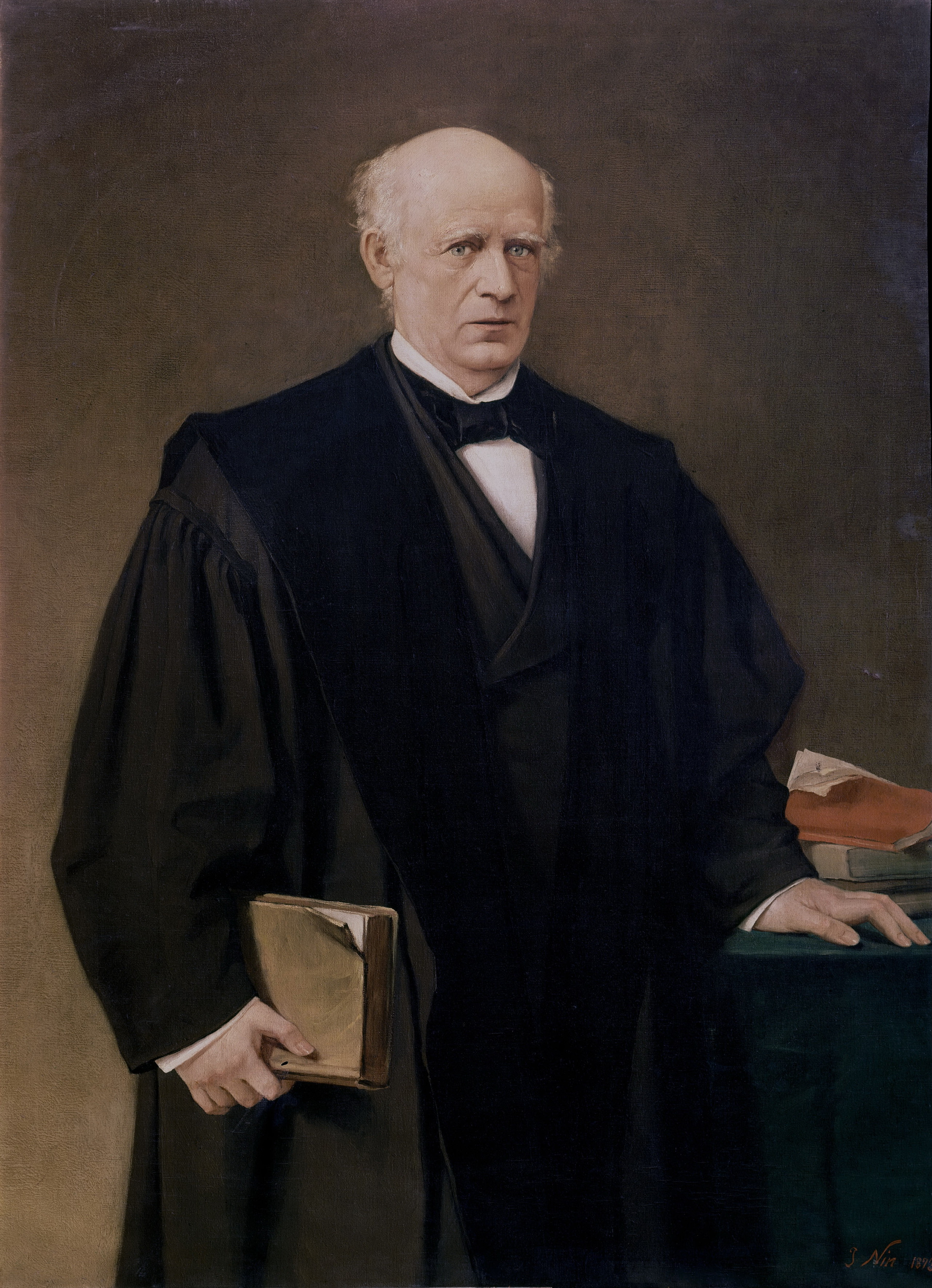
Pascual Madoz, responsible for the legislation that completed the confiscation process.

==== Moderate Biennium (1856–1858) ====
The social agitation provoked the rupture between Espartero and O'Donnell. O'Donnell's presidency (from July to October 1856) sought to carry out an eclectic policy that would satisfy the entire political spectrum, being the first government that did not carry out the traditional renewal of civil servants to place those who were supporters and leave those who were opposed as dismissed. In fact, its measures meant a profound revision of the work of the biennium, with the dissolution of the National Militia and the return to the Constitution of 1845, with the addition of an Additional Act for the extension of rights, which was barely in effect for one month. Given the impossibility of maintaining the appearance of centrality, the queen opted to call back Narváez, who occupied the presidency for a full year, from October 1856 to October 1857.

The most important measure of the moderate biennium was the promulgation of the Law of Public Instruction or Moyano Law, which established the educational system that, with few modifications, remained in force for more than a century.

The economic crisis of 1857 led Narváez to resign, being succeeded by the brief governments of Armero and Istúriz.

The nascent republican movement led the occupation of land in the Andalusian countryside, suffering repression and mass shootings ordered by Narváez (Arahal in 1857 and Loja in 1861). In the cities, the high price of food and indirect taxes (consumption) provoked food riots and consumption riots also inspired by republicanism. The system of conscription (quintas) and the military service of eight years, exemptable by the payment of a fee or a reemplazista, produced injustices increasingly worse endured, that the policy of foreign prestige of the later period will only exacerbate.

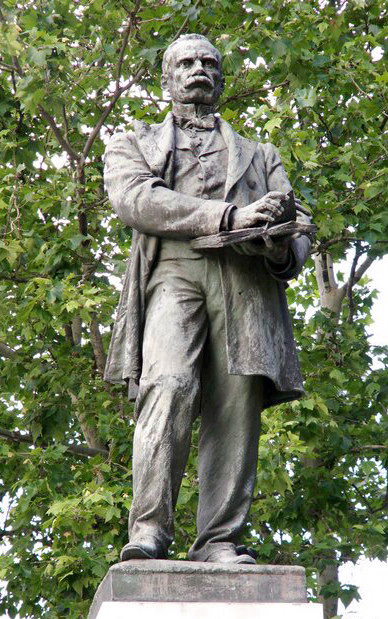
Monument to Claudio Moyano

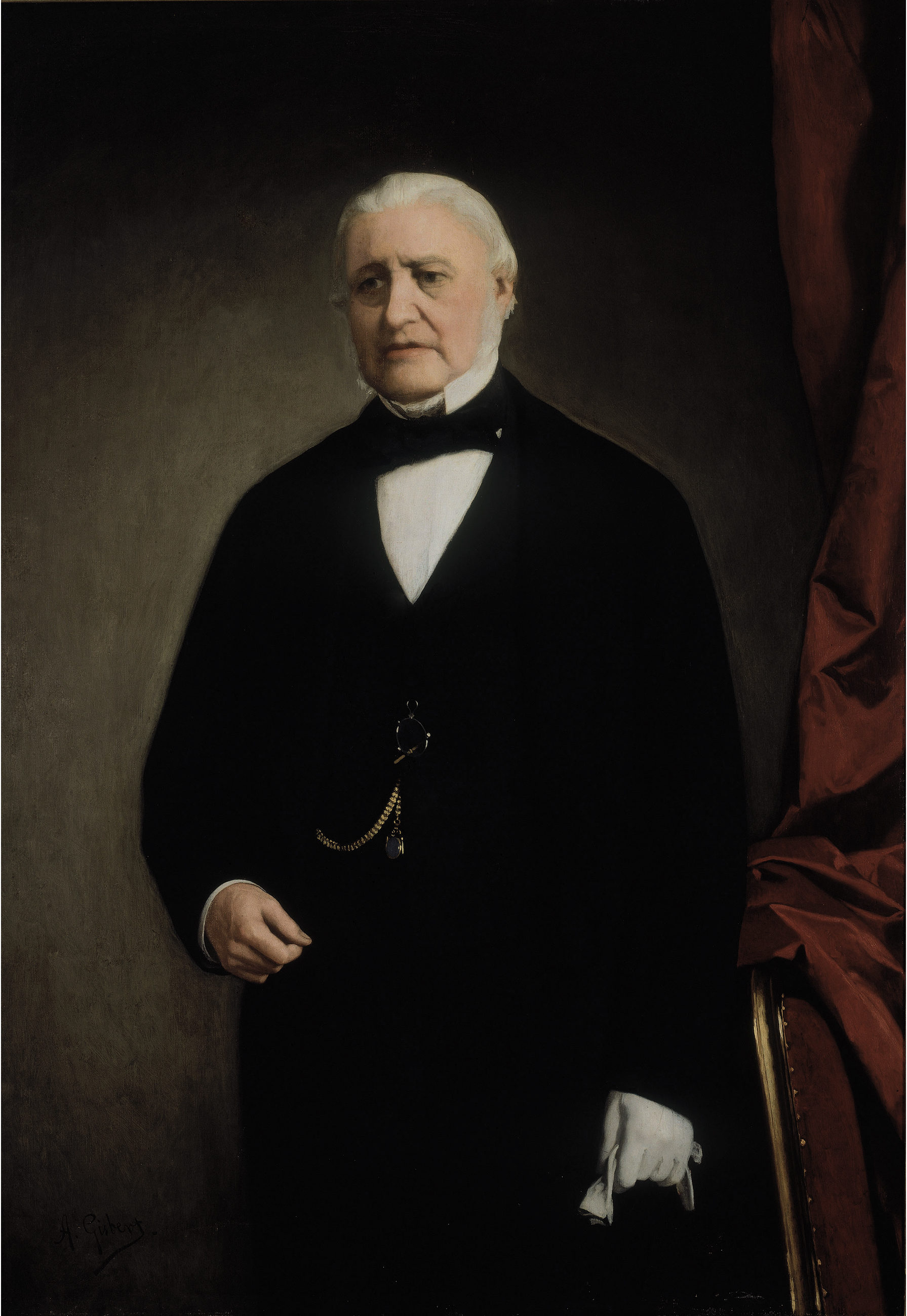
Francisco Javier Istúriz

==== Governments of the Liberal Union (1858–1863) ====
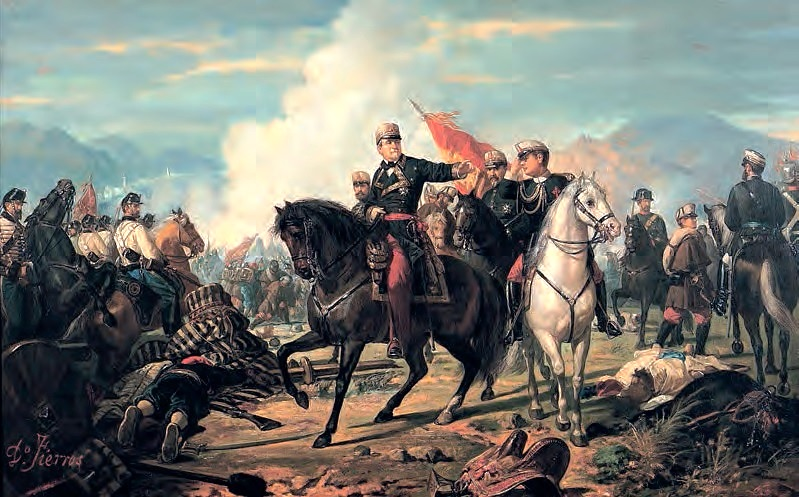
The Battle of Tetuan, by Dionisio Fierros (1894). The battle took place on January 31, 1860.

On June 30, 1858, O'Donnell formed a new government, that along with the following one would be the longest lasting of the time, until the beginning of 1863. During this period, the economic recovery was maintained and electoral corruption and disunity in the party itself was controlled.

Large public works were invested in, the railroad network and the army were developed, the confiscation continued but handing over part of the public debt to the Church and reestablishing the Concordat of 1851. A series of important laws were also passed that would continue to have repercussions later on. However, there continued to be a lot of political and economic corruption, and the promised Press Law was not passed either, thus remaining without parliamentary support.

An attempt was made to undertake a prestigious foreign policy, with a presence in Morocco (African War, 1859–1860) and in places as far away as Southeast Asia (Cochinchina War, 1858–1862).

==== Crisis of moderantism and end of the reign of Isabella II (1863–1868) ====
The progressives and moderates allied to pressure the Liberal Union, causing the resignation of O'Donnell (March 1863). However, the replacement of the government was not easy, since the traditional parties were immersed in serious internal dissensions. The queen, refusing to call elections as was demanded by the opposition, formed successive moderate governments under the presidency of the Marquess of Miraflores, Lorenzo Arrazola and Alejandro Mon, until finally she called back the main figurehead of moderantism, Narváez (September 1864). He tried to reconcile with the progressives by integrating them into the government, which they refused. Narváez's authoritarianism was reinforced, even depriving himself of the support of some of his ministers. The new crisis led to the return of O'Donnell (June 1865). A law was passed to increase the electoral roll by 400,000 voters and elections to the Parliament were called; but without the support of the progressives a stable government was not achieved and the return of Narváez took place (June 10, 1866).

The political crisis was complicated by a serious economic crisis (Spanish stocks fell in the Paris stock exchange, and the railway business deteriorated). The progressive and democratic military tried again to get out of the pronunciamiento, with successive failures (General Prim in Villarejo de Salvanés and the sergeants in the San Gil barracks on June 22, 1866). Narváez's reaction was to act with an iron fist against the political opposition (dissolution of the Parliament, exile of General Serrano and the Montpensier family) and intellectual opposition (closing of the Teaching Schools and dismissal of agnostic professors such as Emilio Castelar —the so-called university question— which had provoked the student protest of the Night of St. Daniel —10 April 1865—, resulting in fourteen deaths and a hundred wounded).

The two main figures of the period died in a brief interval (Leopoldo O'Donnell on November 5, 1867, and Ramón María Narváez on April 23, 1868). Of the latter it is said that, on his deathbed, when the priest asked him to forgive his enemies, he replied "Father, I have no enemies; I have killed them all".

The queen hastily formed cabinets of brief duration, with Luis González Bravo as the new strong man whose only perspective was to continue the policy of repression and banishment of military and politicians. The exile, far from strengthening the conservative forces, served to increase radicalism and the formation of a select group of Spanish intellectuals, who came into contact with all kinds of new ideas circulating in London, Paris or Brussels (Pi i Margall would be greatly influenced by his readings of Proudhon); and so that the Spanish political elite of all the groups situated between the center and the left, in such difficult circumstances, were forced to reach a point of agreement on the essentials. Meeting in a Belgian city, a group of unionists (Serrano), progressives (Prim and Práxedes Mateo Sagasta) and democrats (Nicolás María Rivero and Emilio Castelar) agreed on the so-called Ostende Pact.

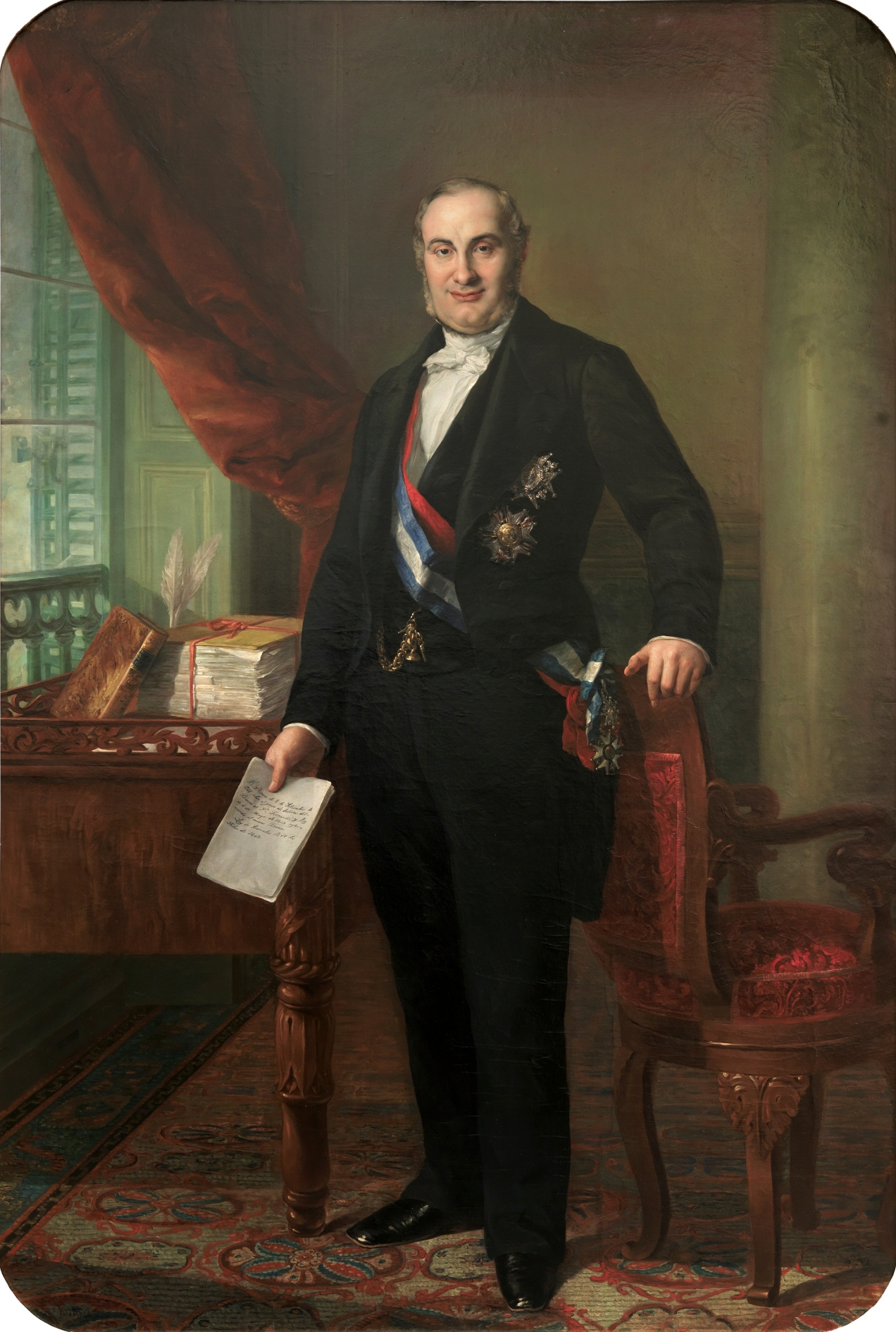
Alejandro Mon

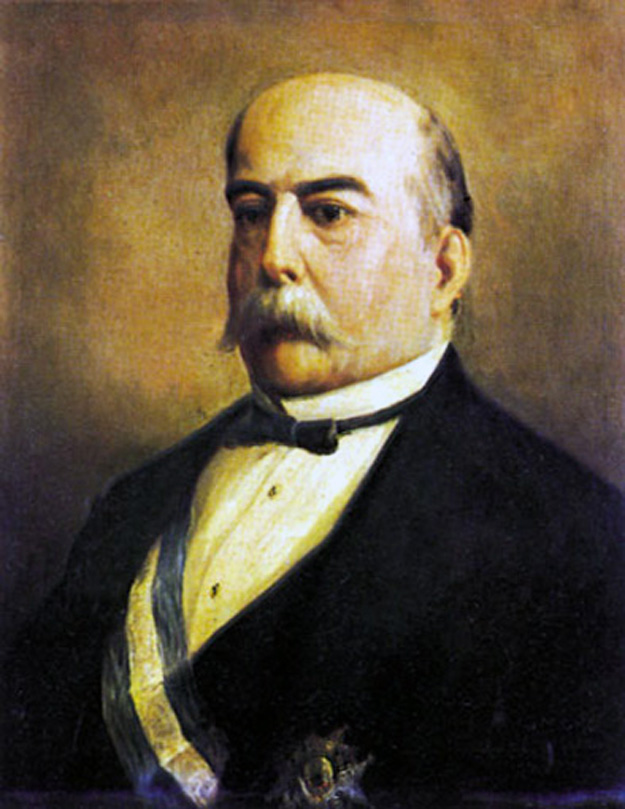
Luis González Bravo

== Sexenio Democrático (1868–1874) ==
=== Revolution of 1868 ===
On September 19, 1868, Generals Prim and Serrano and Admiral Topete took up arms in Cadiz. An army led by Serrano headed from the south to Madrid, conquering at the battle of Alcolea (September 28) the one sent by the government to intercept him. The Queen, who was vacationing in San Sebastian, crossed over the French border and from exile would maintain her pretension of right to the throne, without abdicating in favour of her son Alfonso until two years later.

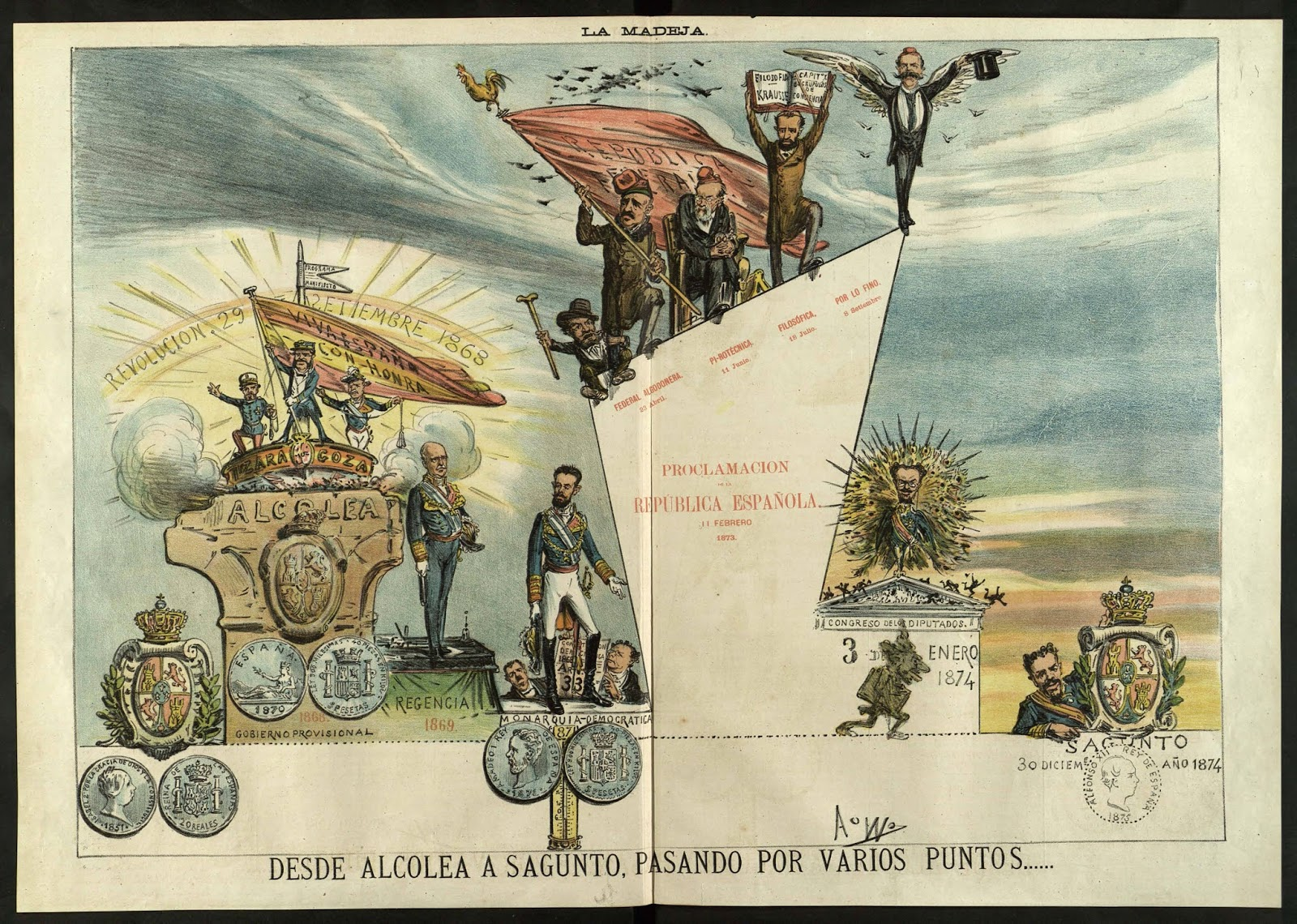
The stages of the Sexenio, satirical drawing by Tomás Padró for La Flaca (magazine) (1874).

The expulsion of the discredited queen was one of the main demands of the "Glorious Revolution", whose slogans were "Down with the spurious race of the Bourbons!" and "Long live Spain with Honor!". Popular mobilization was very important. Once again local juntas were organized as in 1808, 1836 or 1854. The National Militia was organized again, under the name of Volunteers of Liberty.

Serrano, on assuming the leadership of the provisional government as a regency (June 18), tried to moderate the extremist drift of the revolution by dissolving the juntas and declaring that the monarchy would continue to be the form of government; and he called elections to Cortes. Among the first measures was the suppression of the consumption tax, the end of the conscription quintas was proclaimed and universal male suffrage was established. The religious orders that had been operating since 1837 were dissolved, closing monasteries and confiscating their goods, and an inventory was made of the art objects of the churches, which became part of the national patrimony; the anticlerical orientation of the new regime provoked the rupture of the relations with the Holy See.

The revolution brought together multiple interests. In addition to the political groups of Ostend, it was supported by the financial and industrial sectors, aware that the Isabelline government was incapable of overcoming the economic crisis.

From the beginning, the new government had to face the outbreak of the Cuban colonial problem, which had long been in the making and in which the requests for local autonomy were complicated by the problem of the abolition of slavery (constantly delayed by the influence of the slave lobby, dominant in the economic spheres —Antonio Lopez, future Marquess of Comillas—, while the anti-slavery group dominated in the intellectual environment —Julio Vizcarrondo, Rafael Maria de Labra—). The open war broke out on October 10, 1868, with the Grito de Yara (Céspedes), which took advantage of the revolution in the metropolis to declare independence.

=== Provisional Government, Constitution and Serrano's Regency (1868–1871) ===
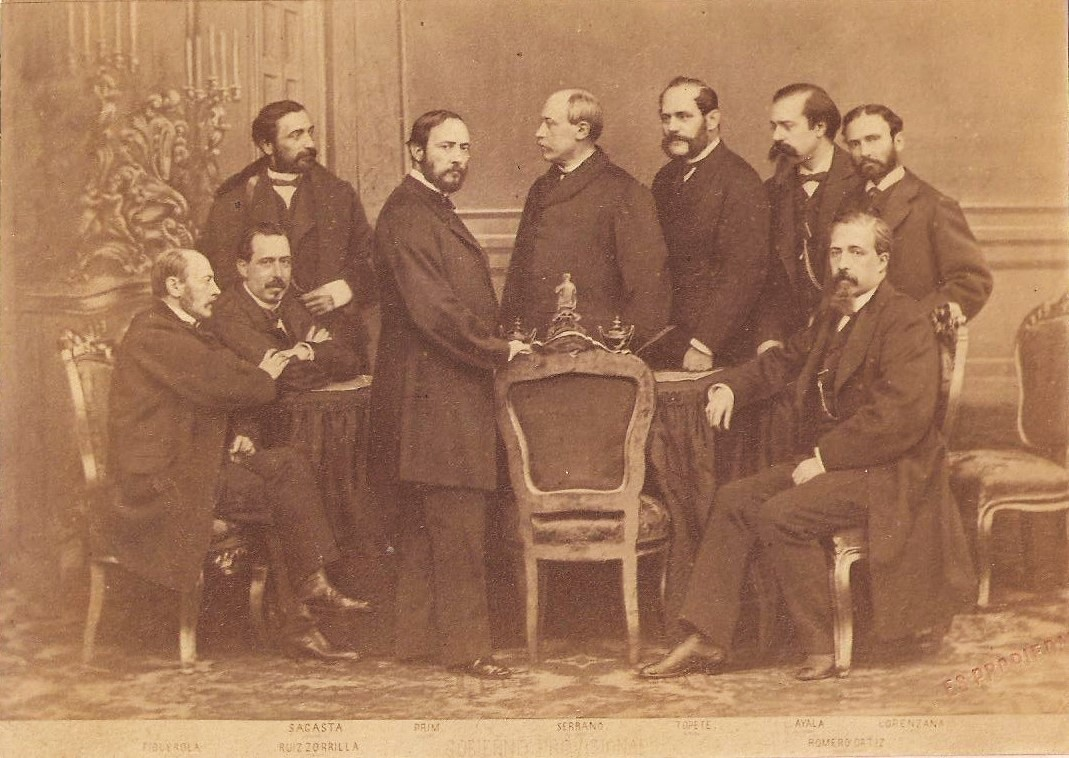
Provisional Government of 1869: Laureano Figuerola, Práxedes Mateo Sagasta, Ruiz Zorrilla, Juan Prim, Francisco Serrano y Domínguez, Topete, Adelardo López de Ayala, Antonio Romero Ortiz and Juan Álvarez de Lorenzana. Photo by J. Laurent.

Municipal elections were called in December 1868, with universal male suffrage. Republicans obtained important parcels of power (twenty provincial capitals, among them Barcelona, Valencia and La Coruña).

At the beginning of 1869 the first Spanish parliamentary elections were called with direct election by universal male suffrage. The parliamentary panorama that emerged from them was multiparty, allowing a majority of unionists and progressives, but with a wide representation of republicans, and less important groups of Carlists and democrats.

The Constitution of 1869, the first democratic constitution in the history of Spain, proclaimed national sovereignty and established a parliamentary monarchy with a strict division of powers, with the government being responsible to the Parliament (bicameral) and the judiciary being independent. The recognition of rights and liberties was broad and detailed (right to vote, inviolability of the domicile, freedom of education, expression, residence, assembly and association); freedom of worship was assured and the budget for Catholic worship and clergy was maintained. Trial by jury was introduced. A territorial decentralization in provinces and municipalities was outlined, and the possibility of reforming the status of the colonial territories was suggested.

In the absence of a king, Serrano became regent, while Prim formed the first governments, with Sagasta and Ruiz Zorrilla in the main ministries. Sagasta, from the Ministry of the Interior, repressed the pockets of federalism that had been active since the revolution. The army (General Antonio Caballero de Rodas) was entrusted with the repression of the republican uprisings in Andalusia, Extremadura, Catalonia and Aragon, which by October 1869 had been liquidated.

The economic measures of Laureano Figuerola (free trade tariff, banking reorganization —the germ of what would become the Bank of Spain—, and monetary —creation of the peseta, 1869—) restored international confidence. Spanish stocks rose in Paris, foreign capital was attracted again and the railroads experienced a new impulse. A new mining law increased activity in the mining basins scattered throughout the peninsular geography (Riotinto, Almadén, Cartagena, Asturias, Vizcaya), which meant the development of an important iron and ferrous industry in the Bilbao estuary.

The Cuban problem was addressed in 1870 with two proactive but ineffective measures: the Moret Law, which sought a progressive abolition (freedom of wombs —at birth—and freedom for slaves when they reached 60 years of age), and the granting of autonomy to Puerto Rico.

The war in Cuba gave rise to a new cause of popular discontent. New quintas were decreed, responded with anti-militarist demonstrations calling for their suppression (led by the mothers of the recruits), especially important in Barcelona, where the army was called in to dissolve them.

==== Workers' movement ====
In that same city, the main industrial center of Spain and the city with the largest working class, proletarian internationalism had reached a remarkable echo after the arrival in 1868 of Giuseppe Fanelli, welcomed by the democratic and republican left (Fernando Garrido, who in exile had already turned to socialism —La Democracia y el Socialismo, with a prologue by Mazzini— and José María Orense, its main polemicist, from an individualist republicanism). To their influence, and to the activity of the first local leaders, such as Anselmo Lorenzo, Francisco Mora and Tomás González Morago, is due the convening of the Barcelona Congress or I Congress of the Spanish Regional Federation —FRE—, where the Spanish Section of the International Workers Association was created, 1870; while in the Zaragoza Congress of 1872 there was a rupture between Marxists or socialists and Bakuninists or anarchists, just as had happened in the Congress of The Hague of the same year. The predominance of anarchism in Spain was very evident in this period, due both to its earlier arrival (Fanelli was close to Bakunin, while Paul Lafargue —who arrived later in Spain, after the defeat of the Commune in 1871— was Marx's son-in-law and was the introducer of Marxism) and to the objective conditions presented by a country with a weaker industrialization, with a predominance of agricultural labor force, and a peripheral position in European capitalism (similar to the Russian case). The diffusion of the different organizations and ideologies of the Spanish workers' movement initially took place in the Catalan and Valencian industrial centers, and in the Andalusian countryside (of anarchist predominance); while the Madrid and Basque centers, of later implantation, had a socialist predominance. The initial demands included, in addition to questions of a labor nature, political questions such as freedom of assembly and association; while, in the countryside, the great hope which was put forward as a redemptive solution to the miserable living conditions, was the distribution of land among the day laborers. The most important mobilizing factor was the anti-militarist protests, which sometimes turned into real uprisings, such as the one in Jerez in March 1869, which was bloodily repressed by the army.

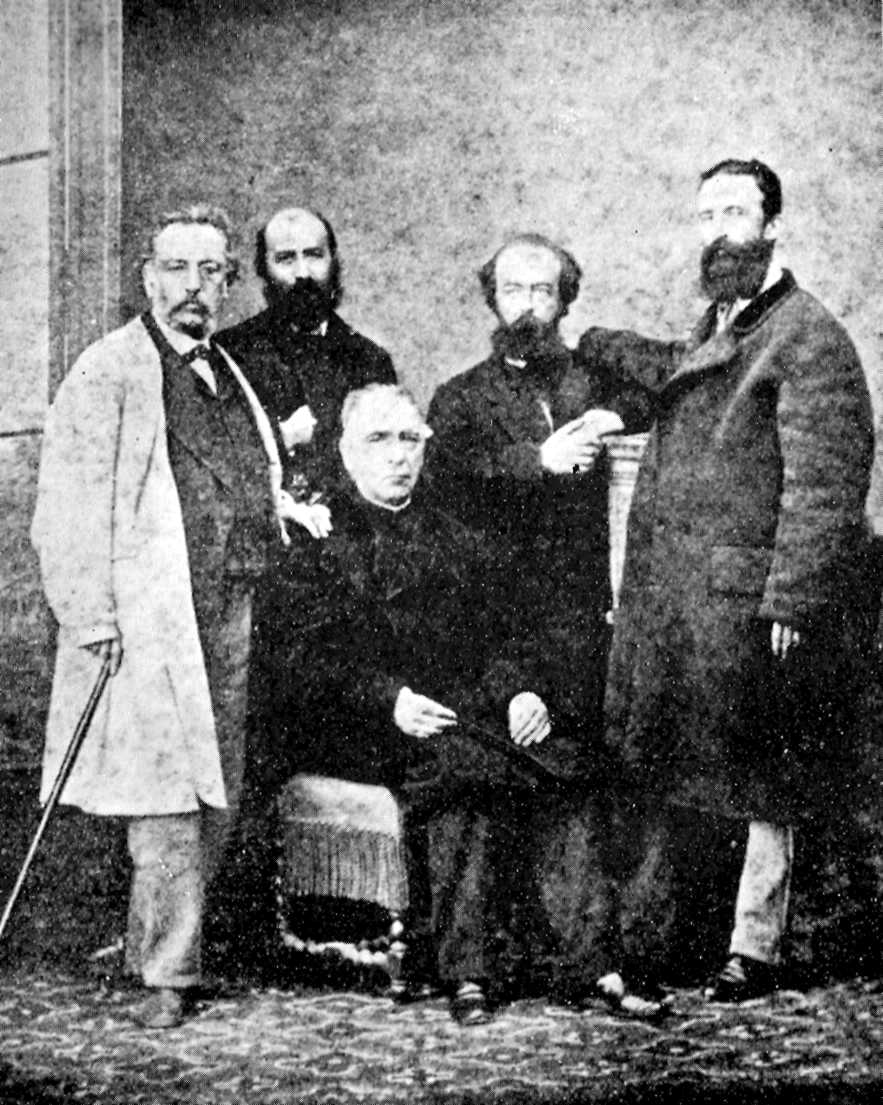
Fernando Garrido, Élie Reclus, José María Orense (seated), Aristide Rey and Giuseppe Fanelli, photograph of 1869

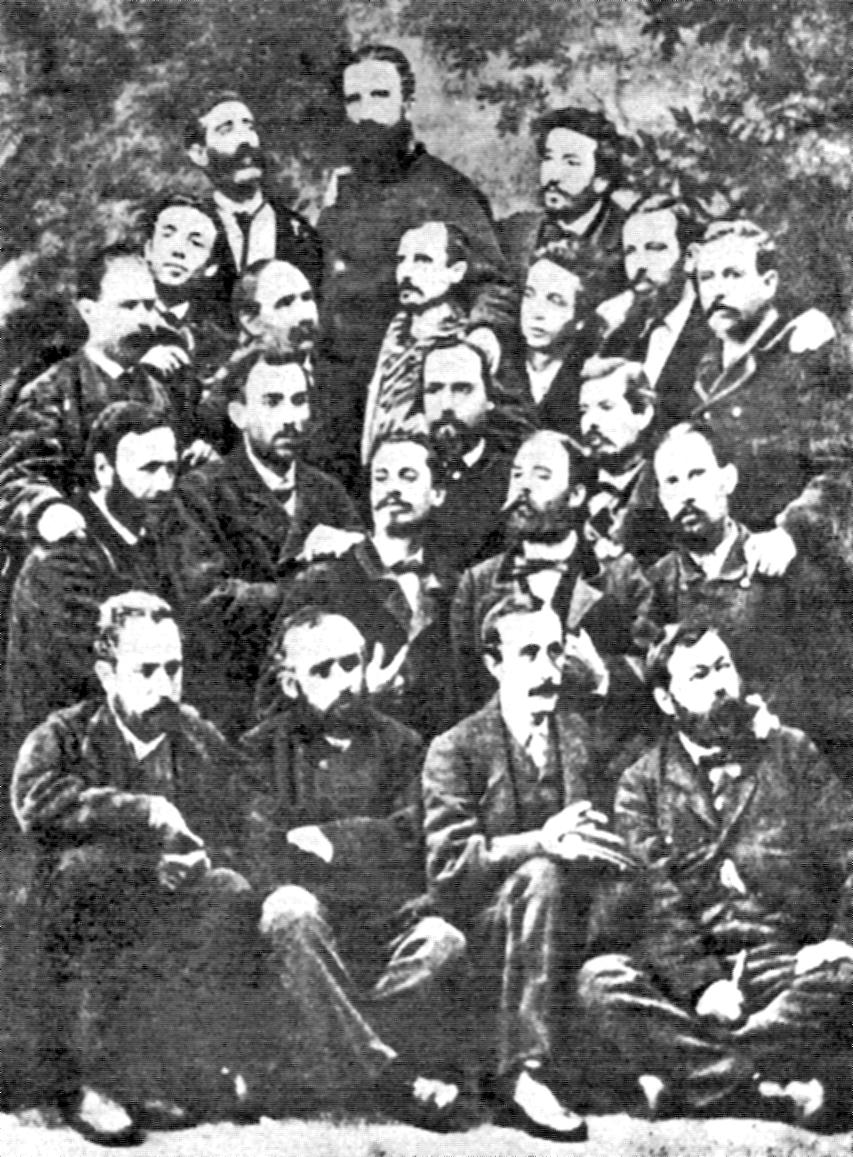
The first group of Spanish militants of the International, with Fanelli. Photograph of 1869.

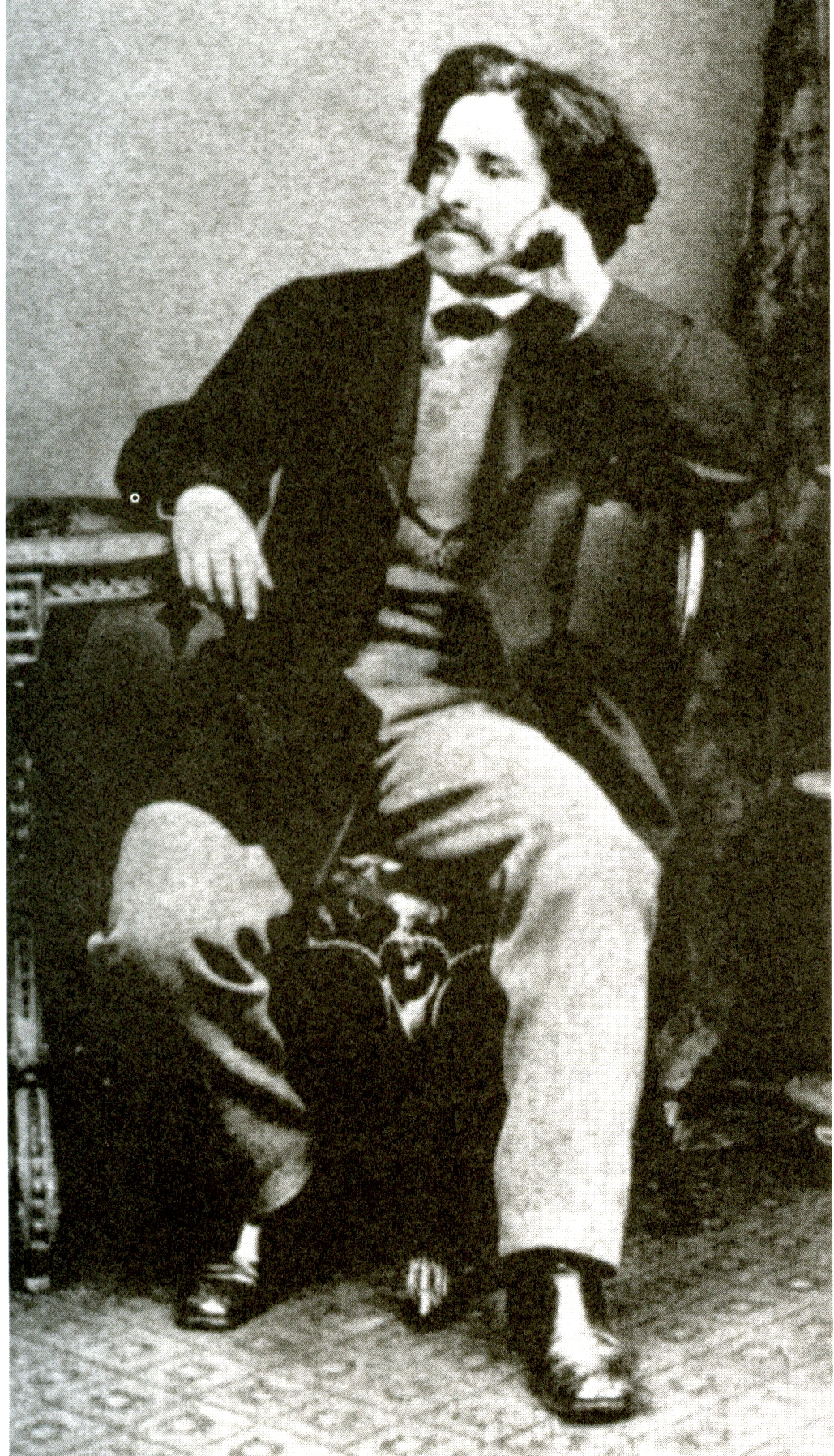
Paul Lafargue, photograph of 1871

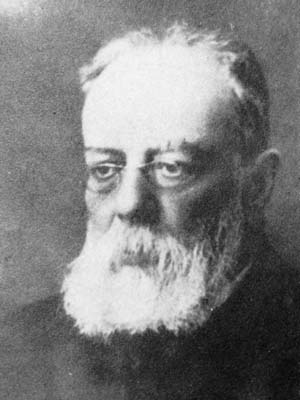
Anselmo Lorenzo, the grandfather of Spanish anarchism

==== Candidates for the vacant throne ====
The internal political issue that absorbed the main interest, and that reached a great international repercussion, was the search for a suitable candidate to occupy the throne. Discarded, for obvious ideological reasons, the Carlist pretender (Carlos VII, who was weighing his options of reaching the throne by peaceful means or by an armed uprising, which would finally take place in 1872 —the Third Carlist War—), several names were considered; such as Espartero himself (the last of the Ayacuchos, already 72 years old, but who would still live 11 more), the Duke of Montpensier (brother-in-law of Isabella II) and a select group of European pretenders, among which were Ferdinand of Saxe-Coburg-Gotha (father of the king of Portugal —the union between Portugal and Spain was promoted by the Iberian movement—) and Leopold of Hohenzollern-Sigmaringen (supported by Otto von Bismarck —chancellor of Wilhelm of Prussia— and rejected by Napoleon III of France, whose confrontation for this cause was among those that led to the Franco-Prussian War —telegram of Ems, July 13, 1870—). Finally, the chosen one will be Amadeo, Duke of Aosta, son of Victor Emmanuel II of Italy, of the House of Savoy, representative of the most liberal monarchy of Europe, whose role in the Italian unification kept it in a hard confrontation with the pope himself.

=== Reign of Amadeo I (1871–1873) ===
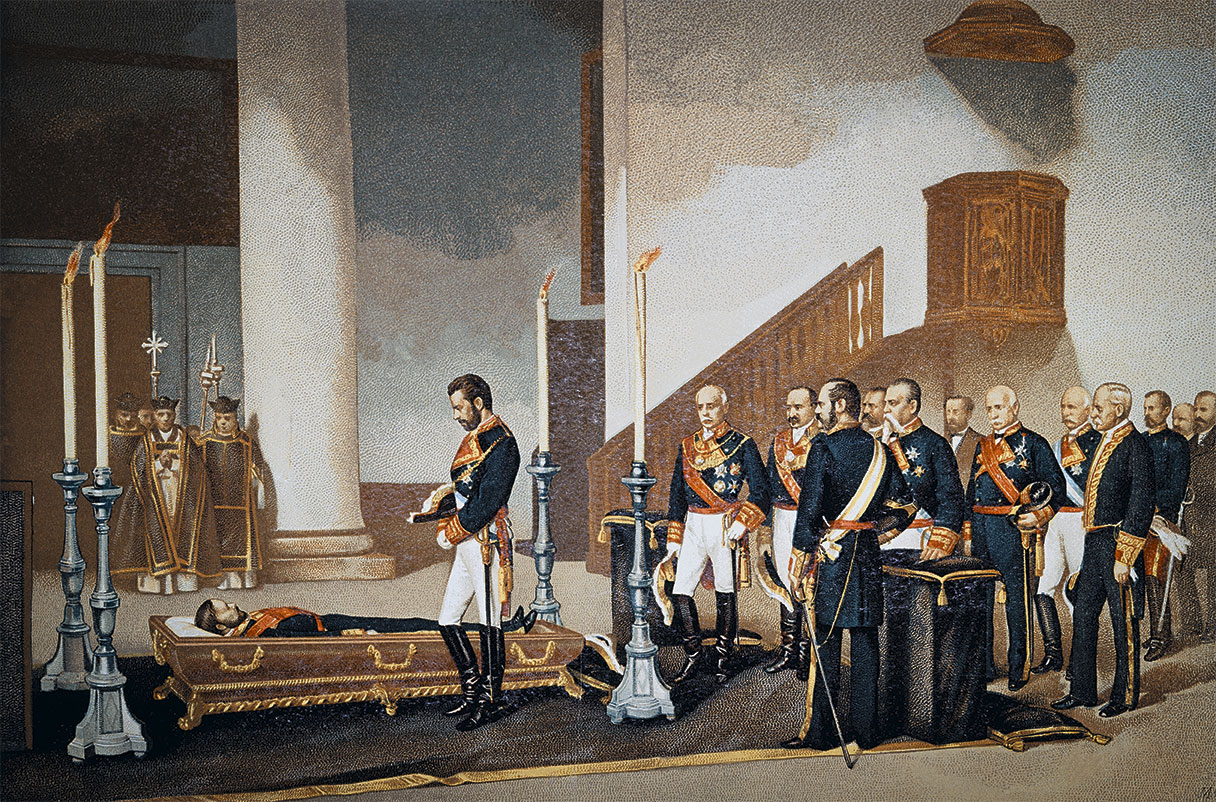
Amadeo I in front of the coffin of General Prim, by Antonio Gisbert.

On December 30, 1871, Amadeo of Savoy arrived at the port of Cartagena, where he received the news of the death of General Prim, his main supporter, victim of an assassination attempt in Madrid three days earlier. The promoter of the assassination is still an enigma. Since then, different possibilities have been speculated: the pro-slavery pressure group for the benefit of their interests, or any of the many political enemies inside or outside Spain that he had made with the royal election affair, such as the Duke of Montpensier, the Republicans, or even some faction of Freemasonry (to which he belonged).

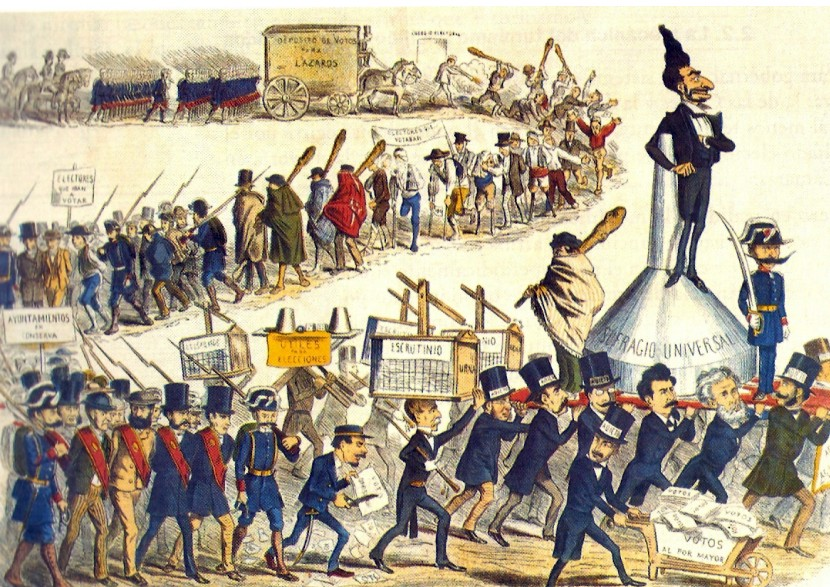
Satirical caricature of La Carcajada (new masthead of the magazine La Flaca to avoid administrative suspension) published on April 18, 1872, with the title "Triunfo electoral" (Electoral triumph). It ironizes the fraudulent methods used by the president of the government and Minister of the Interior Práxedes Mateo Sagasta to win the elections of April 1872. Sagasta leads the procession carried on the back of a funnel with the sign "SUFRAGIO UNIVERSAL" (Universal suffrage). He is followed by all those who have made possible the "electoral triumph": forces of public order, partidas de la porra, lazaros (so called because they are deceased voters who have "resurrected" incarnated by other people), hit men, trileros, local authorities, imprisoned peasants and workers taken to vote, etc.

Amadeo I behaved as a liberal monarch, with scrupulous respect for the Constitution and exquisite political neutrality, which nevertheless did not win him the support of any of the social or political groups. The aristocracy and the upper classes, mostly Bourbon, did not support him.

The main leaders of the period were the progressive party, split into the Constitutional Party of Sagasta, allied with Alfonsinos and Unionists; and the Radical Party around Ruiz Zorrilla, which sought support from the whole spectrum of the Parliament, from the Republicans to the Carlists. The groups established in this way clashed over social issues, such as the abolition of slavery and the problem of the International. Sagasta accused the organization of provoking constant uprisings, and outlawed it. Ruiz Zorrilla was determined to abolish slavery, but the support of the king, whose anti-slavery opinion was notorious, did not play a decisive role, given his institutional situation. The pro-slavery lobby continued with its policy of obstruction by all means, including economic subsidies to the Carlist uprising and contacts with the Alfosinos of Cánovas (whose own brother was a prominent leader of the slave traders).

To the Cuban issue, which was dragging on, was added the Third Carlist War. In May 1872, the pretender Carlos María de Borbón y Austria-Este (Carlos VII) entered Navarre raising an army; but soon after, the Army of the North, led personally by Serrano (who was president of the council of ministers), forced him to return to France after defeating him in the battle of Oroquieta. In an obvious imitation of Espartero's embrace of Vergara, Serrano offered the Carlists such favorable surrender conditions (the Amorebieta convention) that they were rejected by the Parliament; this led Serrano to ask the king for the suspension of constitutional guarantees. When he did not obtain it from the king, he resigned. Nor did all the Carlists (starting with the pretender himself, who considered the signatories traitors), agree to the conditions of the convention; so that the partidas continued, especially in Navarre and Catalonia, sometimes converted into simple banditry. Carlism was becoming increasingly identified with the recovery of the Basque and Navarrese fueros, which the pretender declared restored in July 1872, as well as the abolition of the Nueva Planta Decrees that suppressed the fueros in the Crown of Aragon in the 18th century, which intensified the strength of the revolt, especially in rural areas of Catalonia and, with less intensity, in other areas of Aragon and Valencia.

Amadeo, eager to find a cause to renounce the throne and return to Italy, found himself in a serious crisis between the government of Ruiz Zorrilla and the artillery corps. The king expressed his support to the military, and the Congress to the government, so Amadeo I was justified to present his abdication on February 11, 1873. That same night, the Parliament, aware of the impossibility of finding any candidate to occupy the vacant throne, proclaimed the First Spanish Republic.

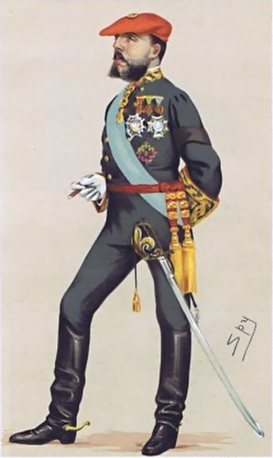
The Carlist pretender, Carlos María de Borbón y Austria-Este, in a drawing from Vanity Fair magazine (1876).

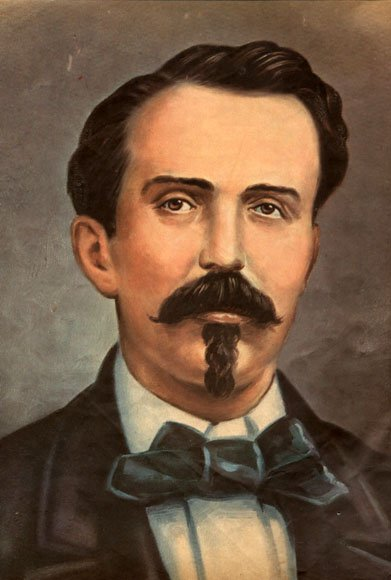
The leader of the Cuban independence fighters, Carlos Manuel de Céspedes.

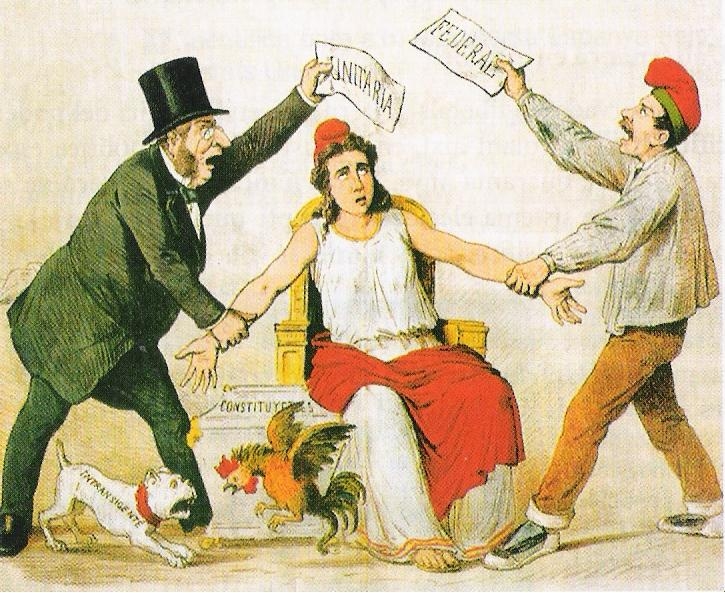
Satirical drawing published in La Flaca on March 1, 1873. Less than a month after its proclamation, the Pretty Girl of the Republic, seated on the Constituent Courts, appears divided between the Unitarians and the Federals (identified with bourgeois and working class costumes, respectively), and the latter between the compromisers and the intransigents (represented by the dog facing the rooster).

=== First Republic (1873–1874) ===
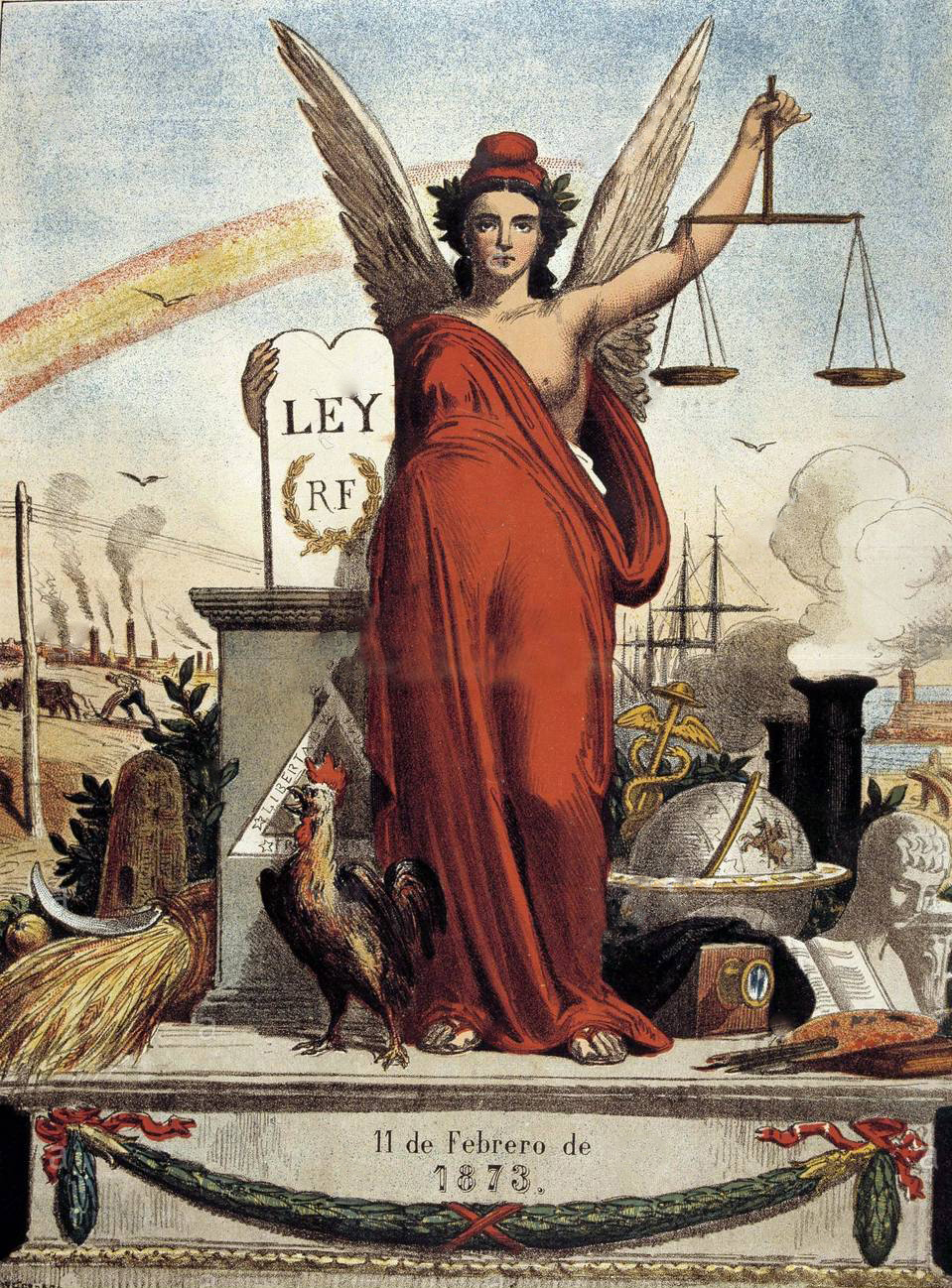
Allegory of the First Spanish Republic. The letters "RF" between laurel leaves are the initials of "República Federal" (Federal Republic). Both in that aspect and in many others, the chosen iconography was very similar to that of the French Republic (the Phrygian cap, the female figure —in France called Marianne, and in Spain the Pretty Girl—, the motto Liberty, Equality, Fraternity —in the triangle—, even the rooster). It is complemented by allegories of the different economic activities, sciences and arts (some indicative of progress and modernity, such as telegraphy and photography). The colors of the flag were the same as the flag used by the monarchy (only the royal crown was replaced in the coat of arms by a mural crown). It was the Second Spanish Republic that introduced a different flag, replacing the red lower stripe with a purple one.

On February 11, 1873, the Congress proclaimed the Republic by 256 votes in favor and 32 against. The Republicans were divided between a minority of Unitarians (Emilio Castelar, Nicolás Salmerón, Eugenio García Ruiz, Antonio de los Ríos Rosas), whose political weight was much greater than their precarious representation; and a majority of Federals, in turn divided between transigents (Francisco Pi y Margall) and intransigents (José María Orense). During the two short years in which the republican experience developed, it always operated in institutional precariousness. In the international context, only the United States and Switzerland recognized the new regime, while the European powers opted to remain on the sidelines (France and Germany had just emerged from the Franco-Prussian War, one of the reasons for which were maneuvering to interfere in the candidacies for the Spanish throne).

Estanislao Figueras, a moderate Republican, was elected by the Parliament as head of the Executive Power, and formed a government exclusively with Republicans of both tendencies (Castelar, Pi —who acted as the strong man of the government from the Ministry of the Interior—, Salmerón and General Juan Acosta —Minister of War—). His first decrees abolished titles of nobility, reorganized the Volunteers of Liberty and announced the forthcoming abolition of slavery, in addition to convening a Constituent assembly. The draft Constitution of 1873 was difficult to elaborate and never came into force. It established a federal Republic of 17 States and several overseas territories, each with its own Constitution. The municipalities would have a local constitution and a division of powers between the mayor's office, city councils and local courts. In the central State, executive power would be exercised by a head of government appointed by the president. Legislative power would be exercised by two chambers, both directly elected, with a Senate made up of four representatives from each State, and a Congress with one deputy per 50,000 inhabitants. The judiciary would be presided over by a Supreme court made up of three magistrates from each State. The president was entrusted with a so-called power of relation with the other powers and the Federal States. Church-State separation was total.

Soon there arose movements in favor of a more radical deepening of the reforms, from a territorial or social point of view: in Barcelona the democratic Federal Republic was proclaimed, of which Catalonia would be a state. The first organizations of the Spanish workers' movement began to have an active public presence, requesting measures such as shorter working hours or wage increases. In Málaga, the internationalists seized municipal power, and in the Andalusian and Extremaduran countryside the day laborers occupied land.

From the opposite end of the spectrum of the 1868 revolutionaries, General Serrano attempted a coup d'état, which failed.

Pi y Margall was proclaimed President of the Republic in June, resigning after a month in the face of the aggravation of the three fronts of violent opposition: the Carlist uprising (which increased its support and territorial extension, with the guerrilla Savalls sowing panic in Catalonia), the continuity of the war in Cuba, and the emergence of a cantonal revolution by the most extremist among the federal republicans (especially strong in the canton of Cartagena).

Salmerón assumed the executive with a decision that would end up being fatal for the continuity of the Republic: to repress the cantonal uprising by means of the army, which was under the control of Alfonsino generals (monarchist supporters of Prince Alfonso, son of Isabella II). Pavia was sent to Andalusia, Martinez Campos to Valencia and Lopez Dominguez to Cartagena. Salmerón resigned on September 7 after refusing to sign the death sentences of some cantonalist soldiers, trapped between the opposing pressures of his own party (Eduardo Palanca) and the military (Pavía). Simultaneously, an international crisis had broken out involving the United States and the United Kingdom in the Cuban conflict as a consequence of the seizure in Cuba of the ship Virginius and the shooting of 53 of its crew, among them American and British citizens.

The next president, Castelar, sought a diplomatic solution to the international conflict, while, invoking special powers, he closed the Parliament until January, with the argument that the executive power should be used without restrictions in the solution of the Cuban, Carlist and cantonal problems. His presidency would not survive the opening of the following session, on January 2, 1874.

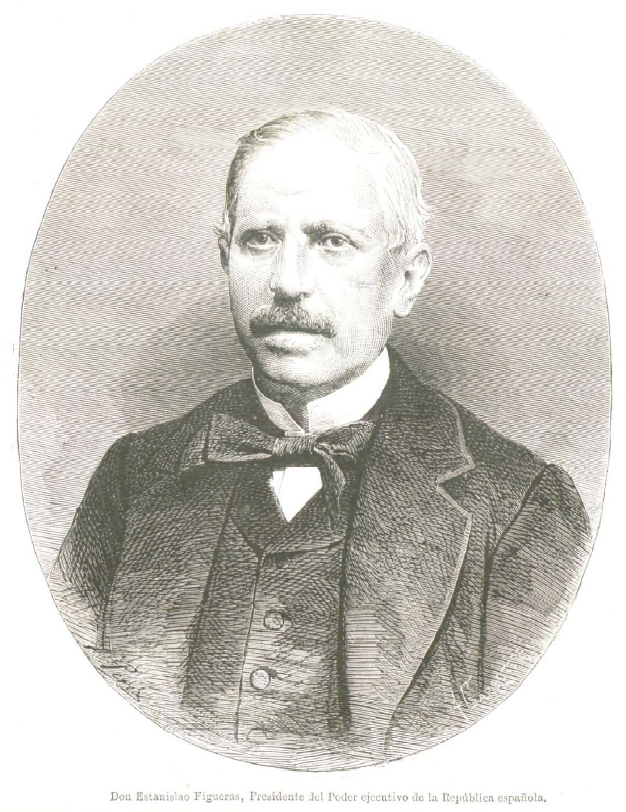
Estanislao Figueras, first president of the Republic (the title used was that of President of the Executive Power).

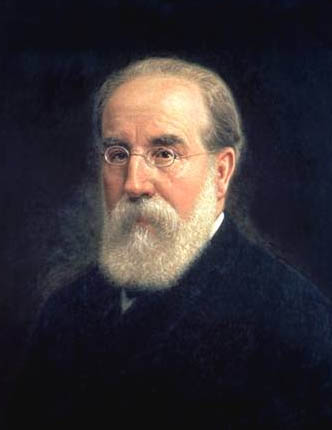
Francisco Pi y Margall, second president.

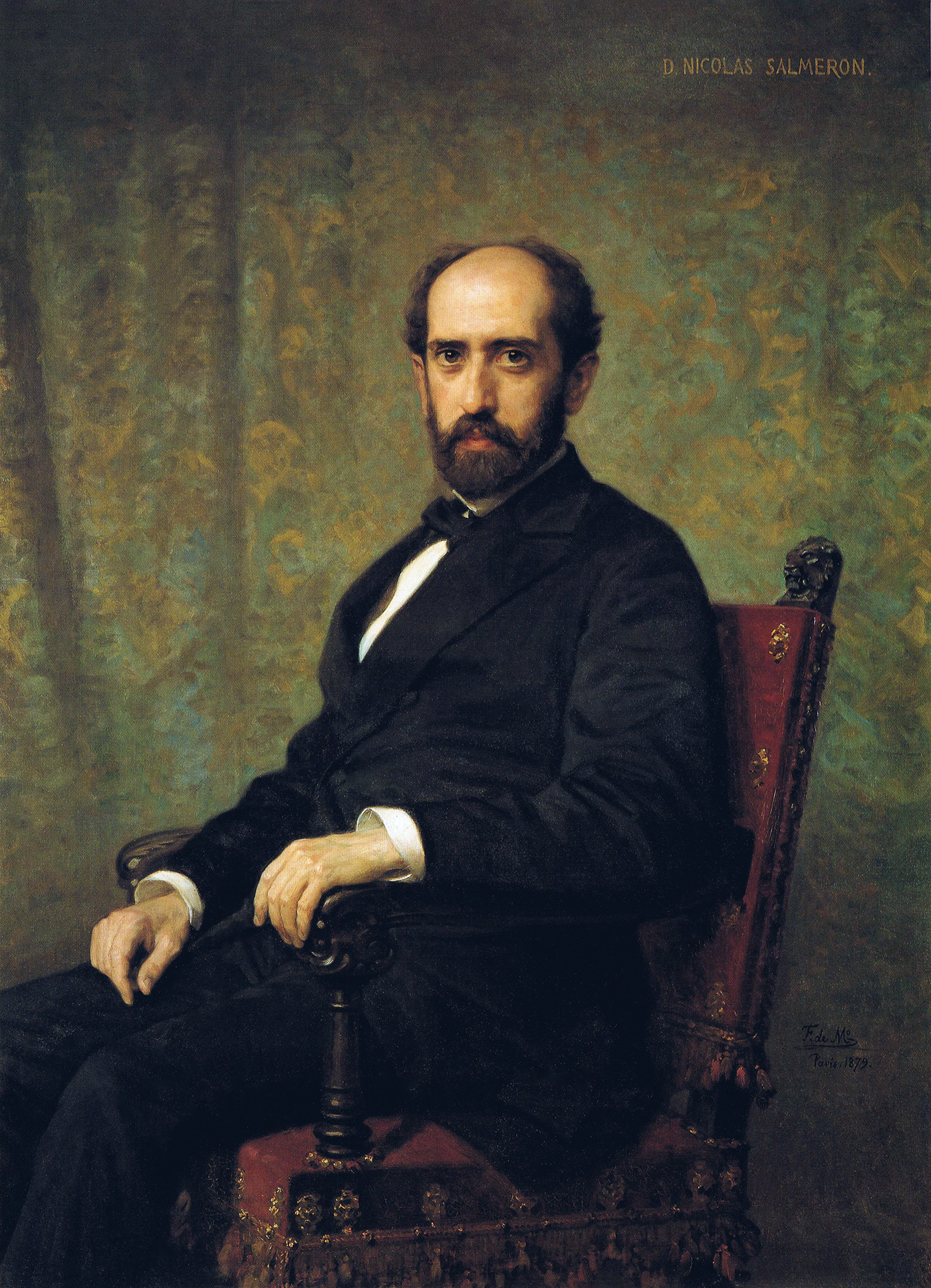
Nicolás Salmerón, third president.

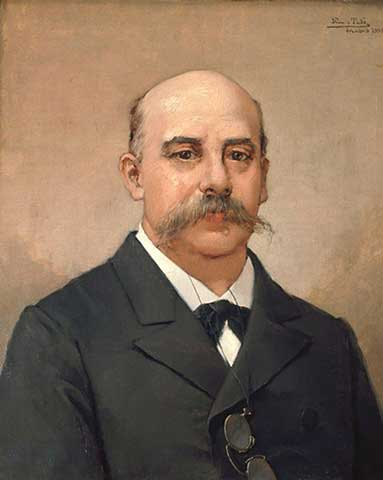
Emilio Castelar, fourth president; during the Restoration period he pressured Sagasta to reestablish the liberties achieved during the Sexenio in exchange for his support.

=== Dictatorship of Serrano (1874) ===
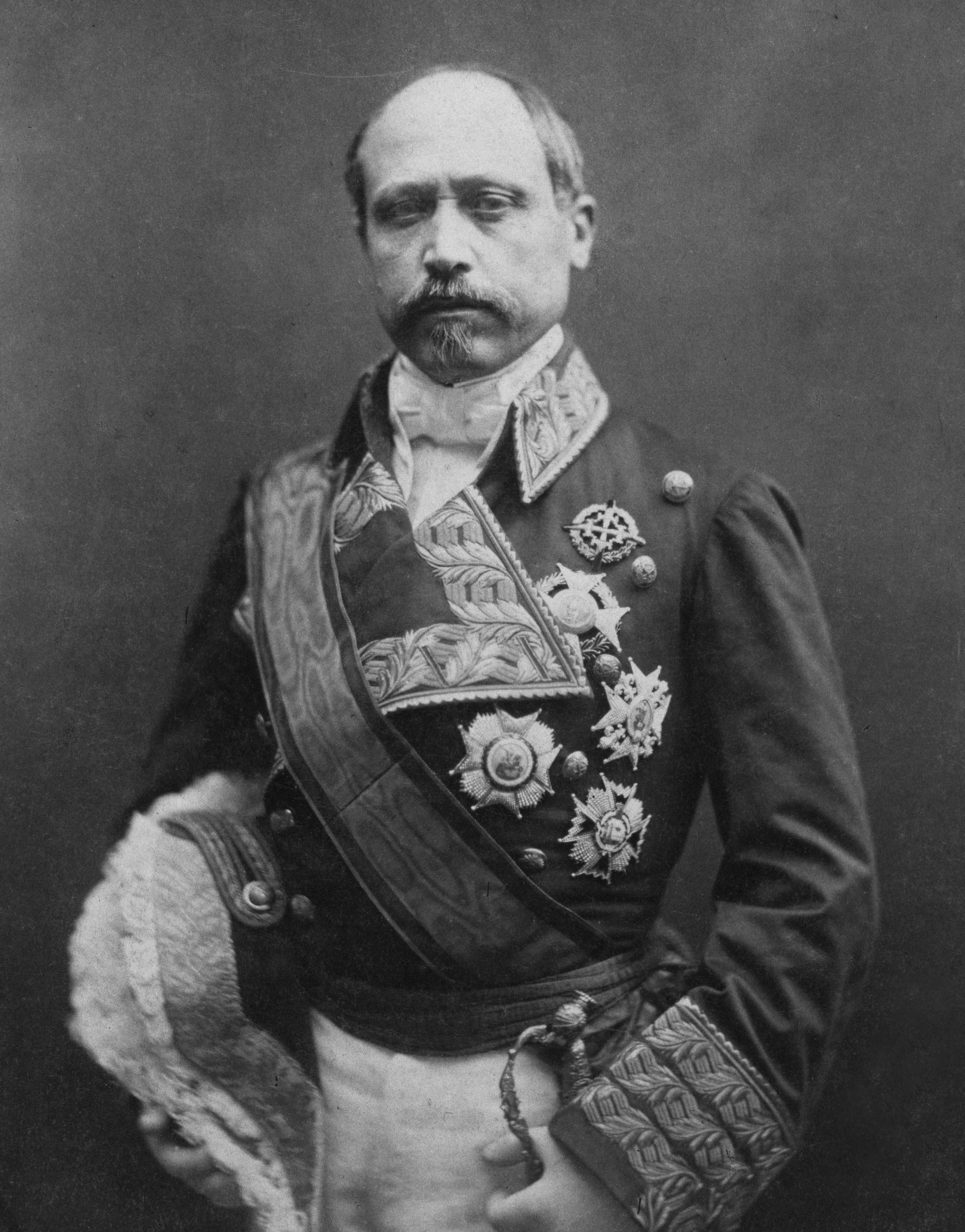
General Francisco Serrano.

On January 3, 1874, General Manuel Pavía violently interrupted a session of the Parliament, which had just withdrawn the confidence of Castelar (although the action was not as spectacular as it was popularly described, the expression el caballo de Pavía became a Spanish political cliché similar to saber-rattling, which alludes to the threat of a military coup d'état). The lack of power led to the formation of a concentration government that placed the Presidency of the Republic in the hands of Serrano, who in practice did not submit to constitutional controls, and his mandate (almost a whole year) was considered a true dictatorship.

In the midst of a serious financial situation, he faced the political problems at the same time that he dedicated himself firmly to try to suffocate the three open war fronts: the cantonal rebellion in Cartagena, the Third Carlist War and the war in Cuba. He formed a government with the unitary republicans of Eugenio García Ruiz, with José de Echegaray in the Treasury, who put the finances in order giving shape to the Bank of Spain. Sagasta, president of the Council of Ministers since September (the presidents of the executive power of the previous period assumed both positions, while Serrano preferred to designate another for that position, leaving him in a position institutionally similar to that of the kings), illegalized again the Spanish section of the International and closed revolutionary headquarters and newspapers, dissolving groups such as the Volunteers of Liberty.

Immediately the European powers, with Germany at the head, recognized the new regime.

Alfonso, the son of Isabella II, who was receiving military training in England, sent from the Royal Academy of Sandhurst a message to the Spaniards (the Sandhurst manifesto) promoted by the Alfonsino party, the most moderate group among the Spanish monarchists, led by Antonio Cánovas del Castillo. In a conciliatory tone, he declared that he had learned the lesson derived from his mother's expulsion and his purpose of never ceasing to be a good Spaniard, nor, like all my ancestors, a good Catholic, nor, as a man of the century, a true liberal; he sought the support of a wide area of the political spectrum, between the reactionaries and the moderate liberals.

In the meantime, the war situation was prolonged in the regions with Carlist implantation. The armies of the government, led by General Serrano himself, contained the Carlists in Navarre, managed to lift the siege of Bilbao and undertook an offensive in the area of Cuenca.

On December 29, 1874, General Martínez Campos started an uprising in Sagunto in favor of Prince Alfonso. Serrano opted to recognize the fait accompli and not to oppose the pronunciamiento; calling Cánovas, leader of the Alfonso party, to form a government, but who did not look favorably on the military protagonism in the return of the Bourbons to the throne. He managed to marginalize the rebel general, leaving the government in civilian hands.

== Bourbon Restoration in Spain (1874–1931) ==
=== Reign of Alfonso XII (1874–1885) and regency of Maria Christina (1885–1902) ===
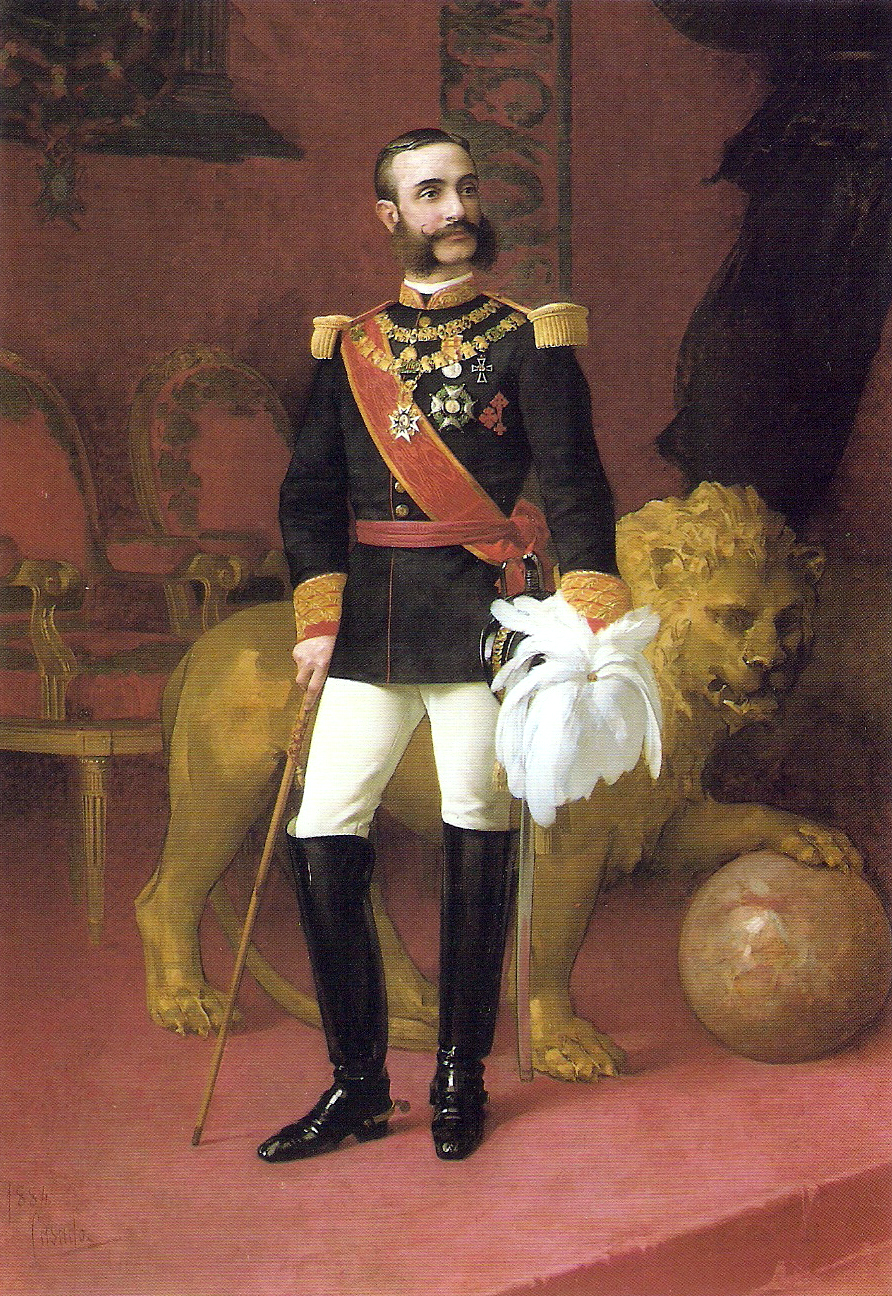
Alfonso XII

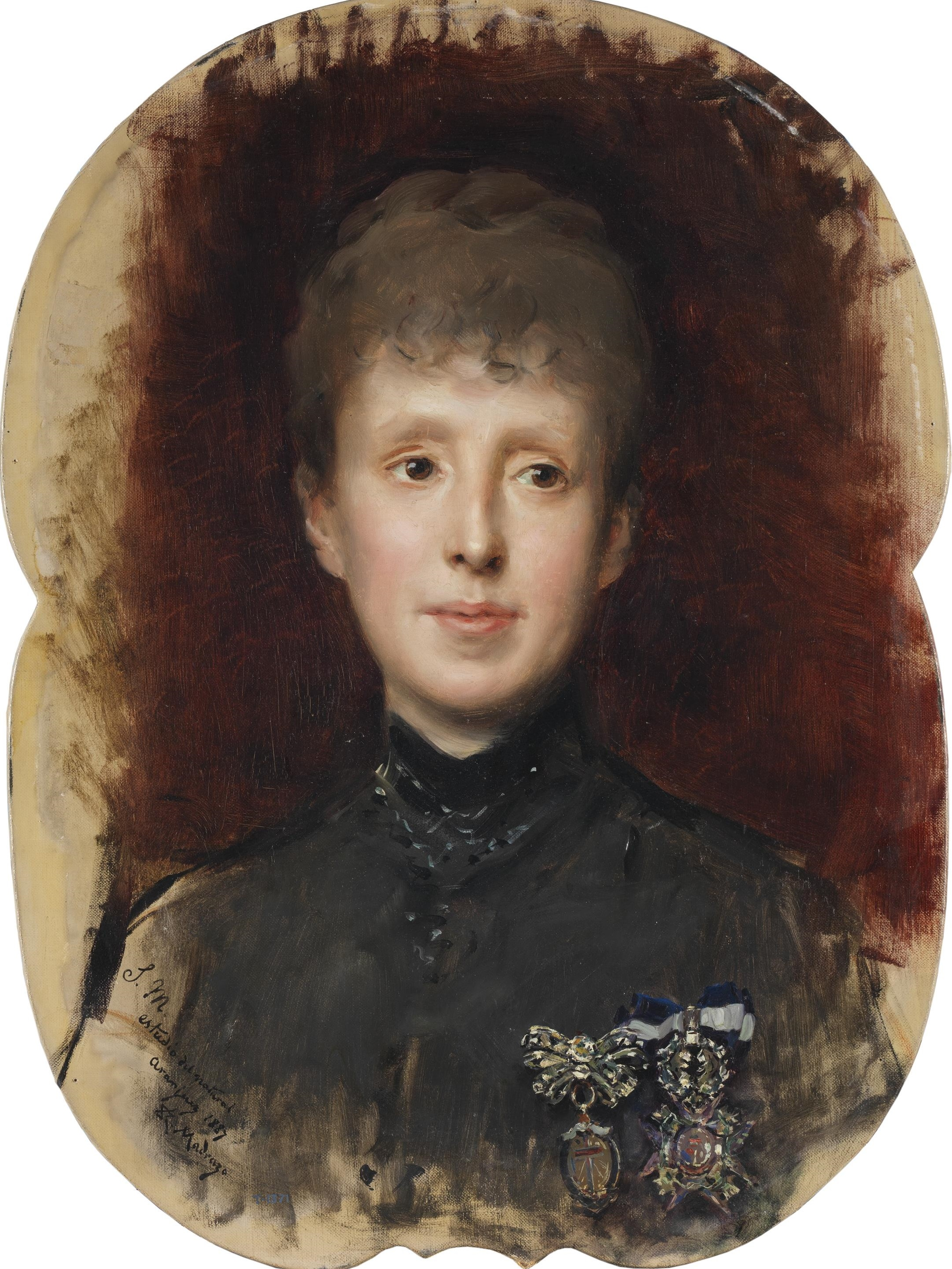
Regent Maria Cristina de Habsburgo-Lorena.

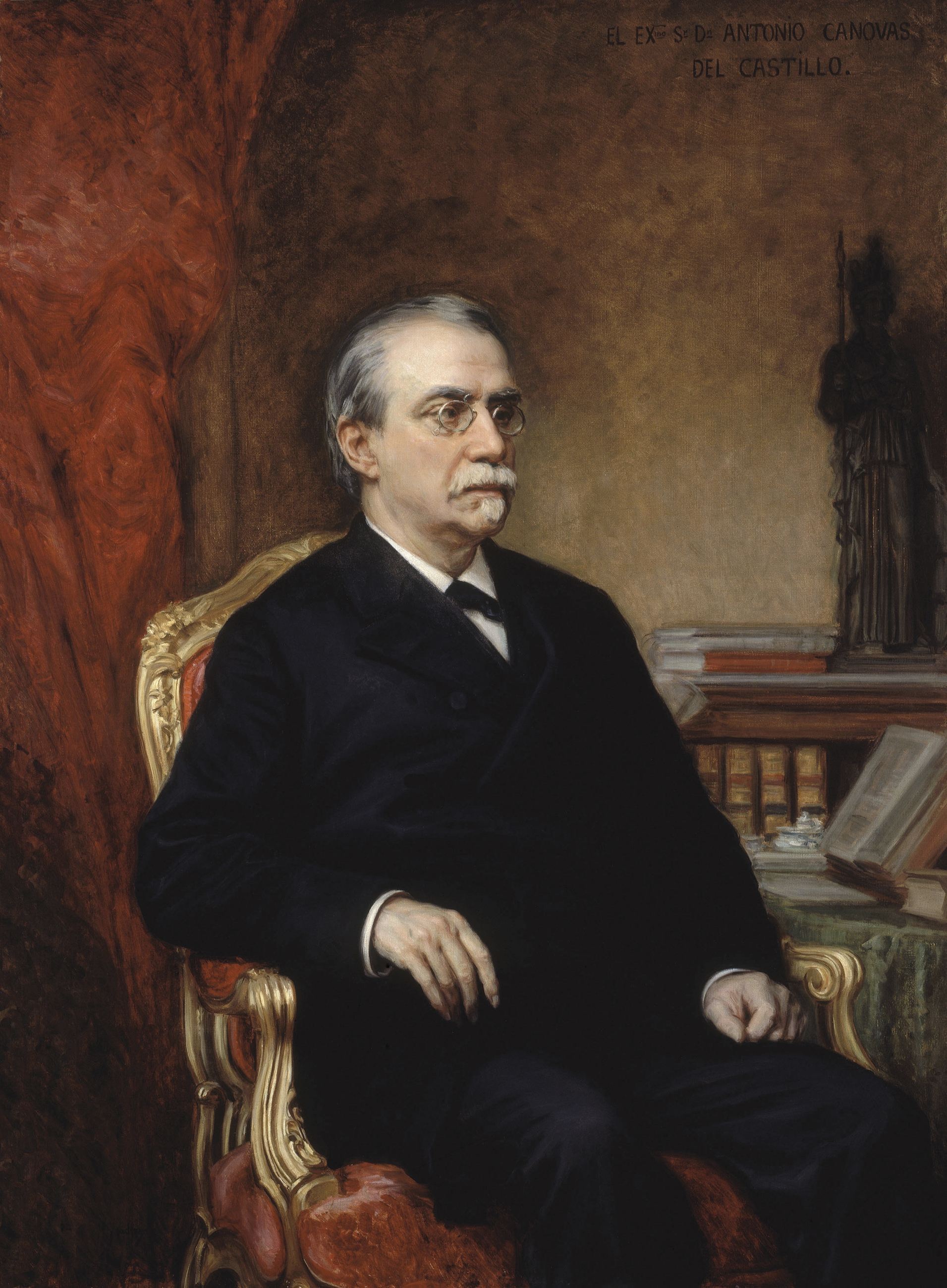
Antonio Cánovas del Castillo, maximum leader of the Conservative Party, promoted a two-party system of political alternation along with Sagasta's Liberal Party.

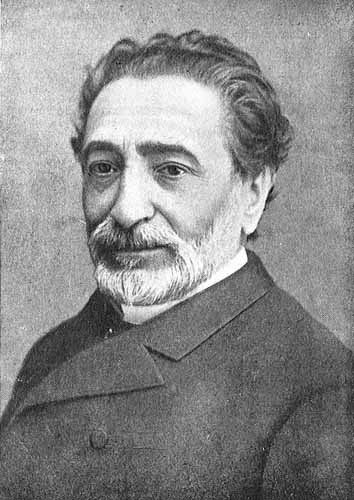
Práxedes Mateo Sagasta, founder of the Liberal Party and seven times president of the government. He was also an engineer, a prominent Freemason and Grand Master of the Grand Orient of Spain.

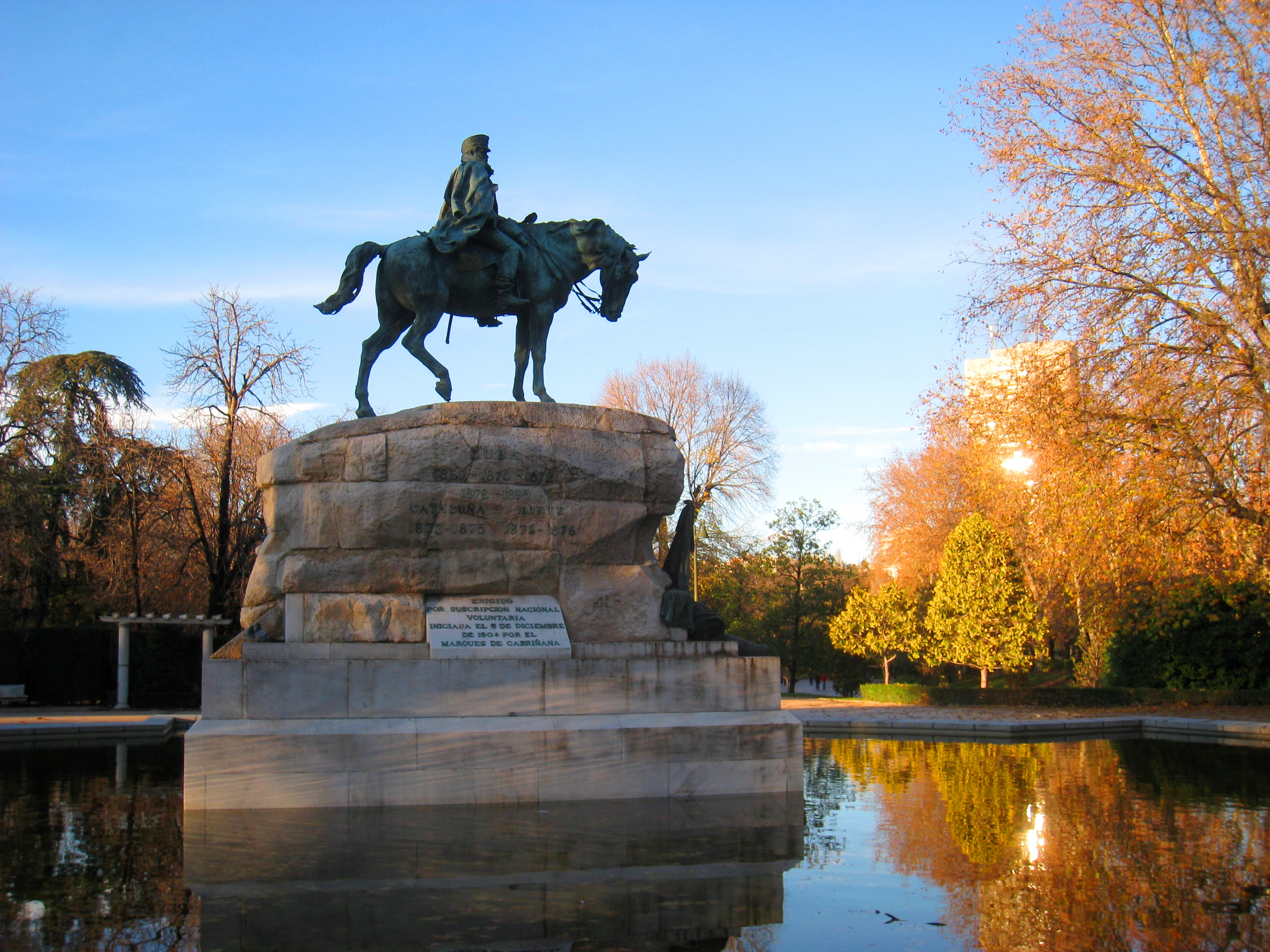
Monument to General Arsenio Martínez Campos, by Mariano Benlliure. Its location in Madrid's Retiro Park gave rise to a certain mischievous interpretation, since it turns its back on the nearby Monument to Alfonso XII.

After the restoration of the Bourbons, the new king restored Cánovas to power, who called elections in January of the following year under the system provided for in the Constitution of 1869 (universal suffrage), which gave him an overwhelming majority of conservative monarchists sympathetic to his government. The drafting of the Spanish Constitution of 1876 was entrusted to a commission of notables chosen by Cánovas himself and presided over by Manuel Alonso Martínez, which was presented to the Parliament and approved without major changes on June 30. It was decided not to specify the electoral system (so that the following elections would be held by census suffrage until 1890). Sovereignty was shared between the King and the Parliament, in a bicameral parliamentary system that left to the executive power the exercise of a very broad power. The recognition of public liberties was limited. The Catholic confessionality of the state and tolerance towards other religions were defined. For the stability of the political system, Cánovas, who organized the Liberal-Conservative Party around him, was aware of the need to have a dynastic opposition, that is to say, faithful to the Alfonsian parliamentary monarchy. In 1879 Sagasta, supported by Emilio Castelar, created the Liberal-Fusionist Party which integrated progressives and democrats disenchanted with republicanism. From the pact of El Pardo (November 24, 1885, in the face of the possibility that a political crisis would break out on the death of Alfonso XII) the agreement between Cánovas and Sagasta established an almost automatic turnismo for both parties to succeed each other in power, which implied that the conservatives had to accept that the liberals would gradually recover the political conquests of the six-year period (freedom of the press, right of association or universal suffrage). The control of the elections through the Ministry of the Interior (encasillado of the candidates) became the key point of a system that was based on the so-called caciquismo: the local predominance of personalities of great social prestige and economic position, establishing clientelistic networks and manipulating the results (pucherazo).

The talk

at the back of an apothecary's shop:

—I don't know,

Don José,

how the liberals are

so doggish, so immoral.

—Oh, calm down!

After the carnivals are over

the conservatives will come,

good stewards

of your house.

Everything comes and everything passes.

Nothing eternal:

no government

that lasts,

nor evil that lasts a hundred years.

Antonio Machado, Rural meditations

Despite the characteristic stability of the Canovist system, there were dissensions within the dynastic parties, led by personalities such as Francisco Silvela (very critical of the caciquismo, which did not prevent him from being minister of the interior), Francisco Romero Robledo or Raimundo Fernández Villaverde in the conservative party, and Segismundo Moret or Eugenio Montero Ríos in the liberal party. The non-dynastic parties were in practice excluded from any possibility of reaching power, although at the end of the century they began to obtain some representation in urban constituencies, which were more difficult to manipulate. That was what allowed the nascent Catalanist movement (around Enric Prat de la Riba — Unió Catalanista, 1891, Bases de Manresa, 1892) to reach the Parliament (Liga Regionalista, 1901); while the Basque Nationalist Party of Sabino Arana, much more radical, took several years longer.

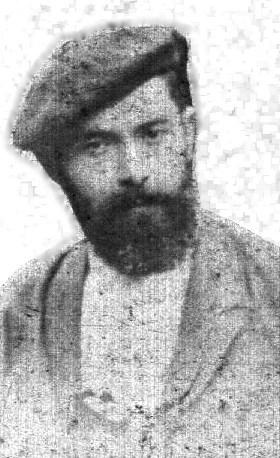
Sabino Arana.

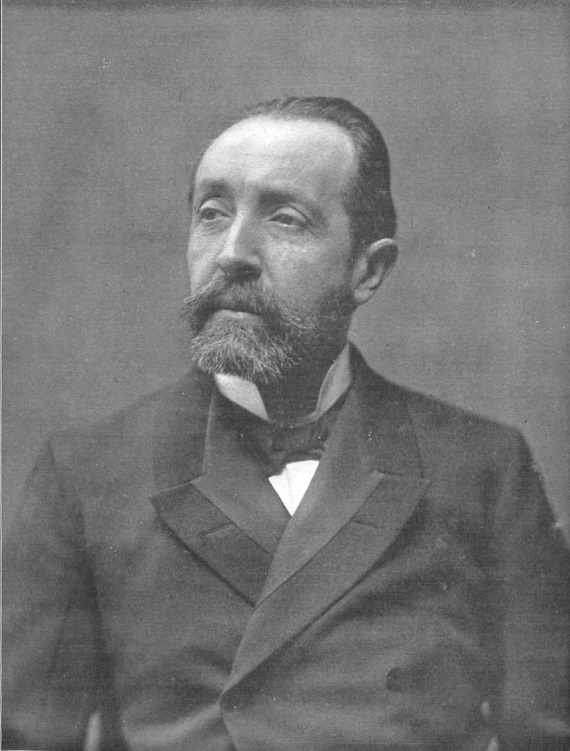
Bartomeu Robert, one of the four elected by the Liga in 1901, with Sebastián Torres, Alberto Rusiñol and Lluís Domènech

The labor movement was reorganized with the creation of parties and unions of Marxist ideology (PSOE (1879) and UGT (1888), under the leadership of Pablo Iglesias, who opted for electoral participation, with greater implantation in Madrid and the Basque Country) or anarchist (Federation of Workers of the Spanish Region (1881) who opted for non-intervention in the political system, with a greater implantation in Catalonia and Andalusia). A confusing network of anarchist groups and individuals developed practices of the so-called direct action, which included, along with peaceful measures, other violent ones (propaganda of the deed) with terrorist attacks in some cases very spectacular (bombing of the Liceo de Barcelona (1893), assassination of Cánovas in 1897), and in other cases manipulated by the authorities themselves (La Mano Negra, 1882–1884).

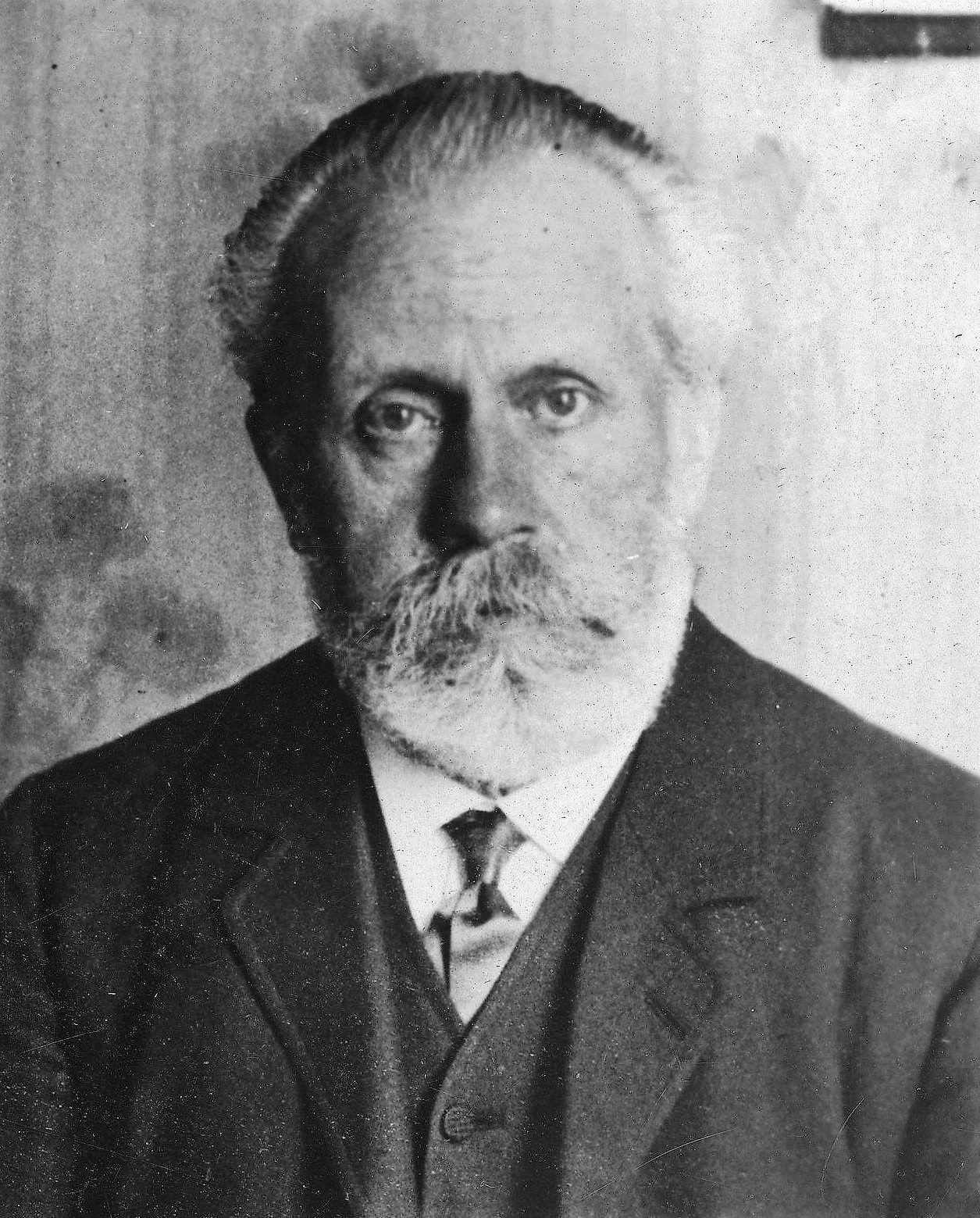
Pablo Iglesias.

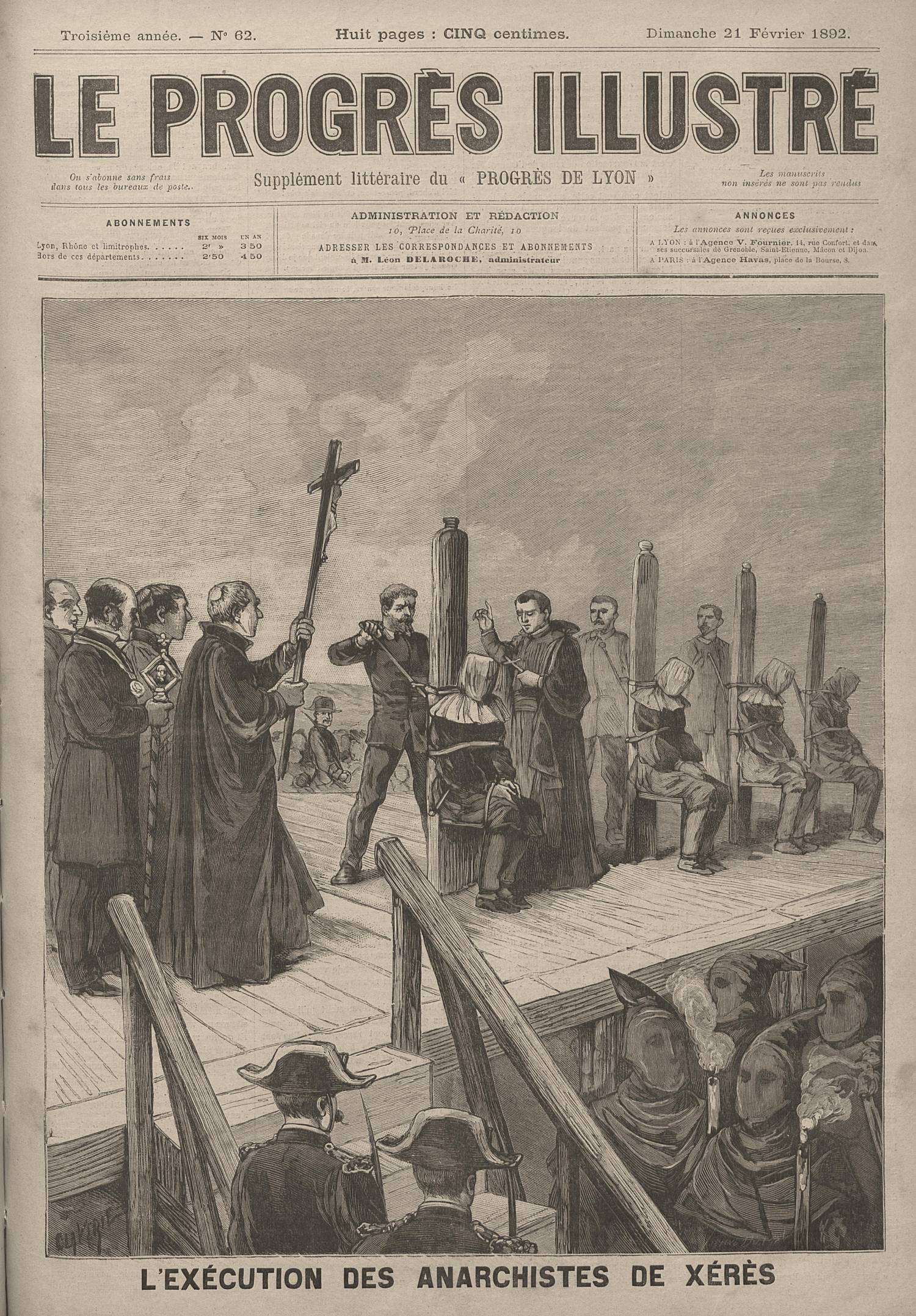
Execution in Jerez of seven anarchists accused of belonging to La Mano Negra, 1884 (illustration from a French magazine of 1892).

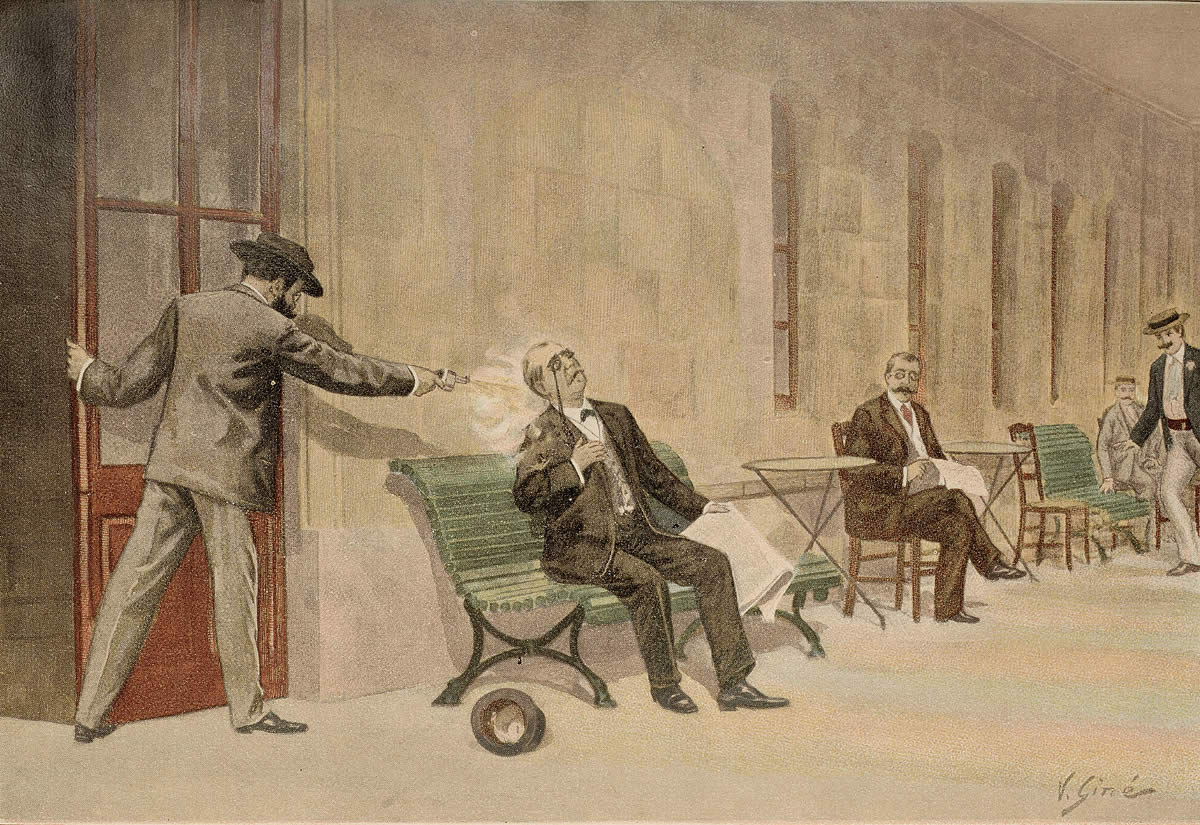
Artistic reconstruction of the assassination of Cánovas by Michele Angiolillo.

The so-called university question was the main conflict of intellectual life and one of the most defining political issues of the new system: the Circular de Orovio of 1875 (by the Marquess of Orovio, Minister of Public Works) substantially limited academic freedom by obliging to maintain teaching in terms that did not affect Catholicism and the monarchy. A good number of university professors, identified as krausistas (Francisco Giner de los Ríos, Gumersindo de Azcárate, Teodoro Sainz Rueda, Nicolás Salmerón, Augusto González Linares) were expelled from the university and a group of them met to continue teaching outside the university, in the Institución Libre de Enseñanza, which initiated a pedagogical renovation of great importance.

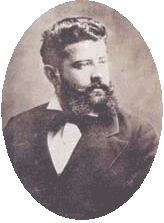
Augusto González Linares.

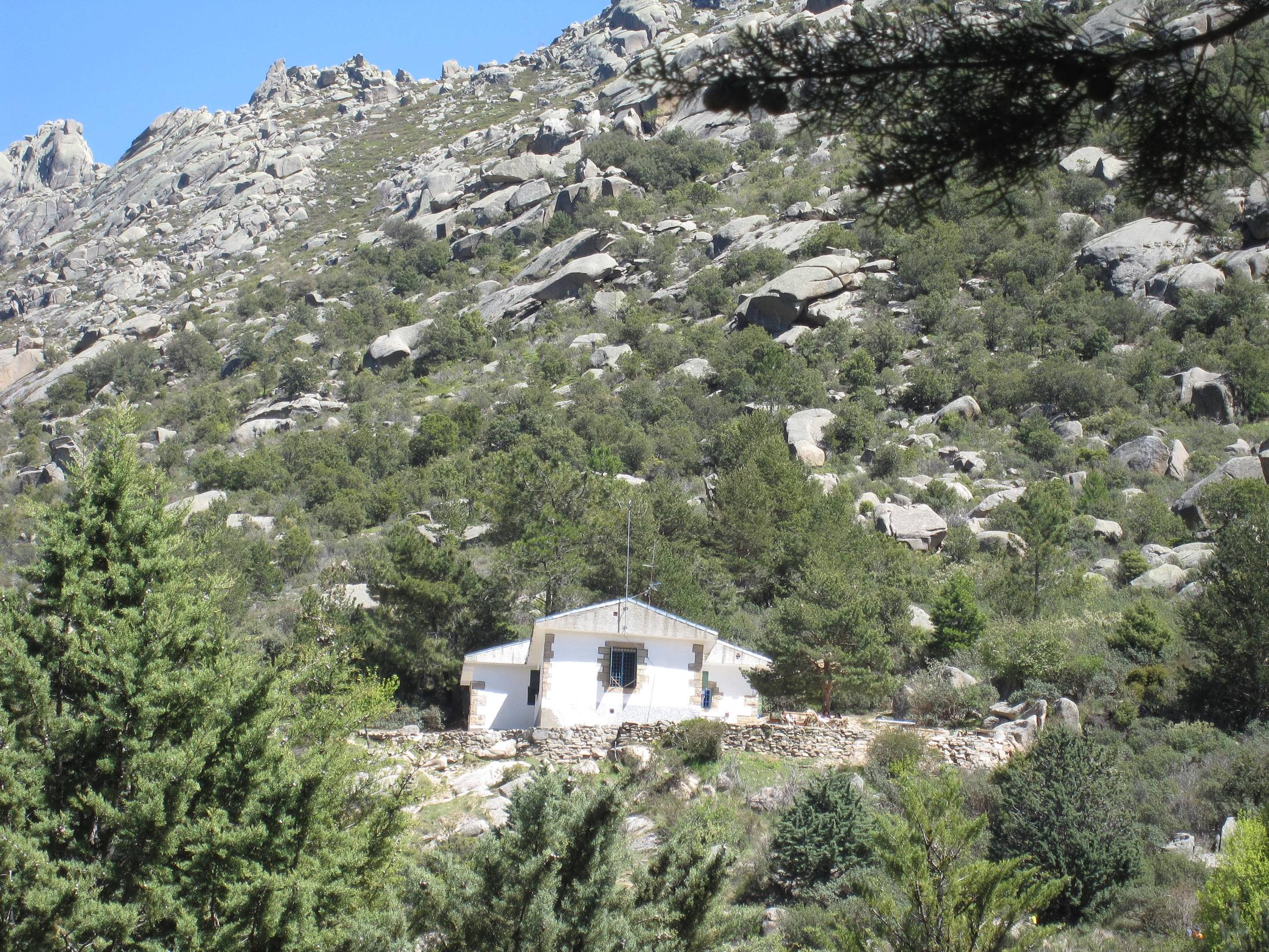
Refuge in La Pedriza that bears the name of Giner de los Ríos since its first construction in 1914. Nature excursions were one of the innovative educational resources of the Institución Libre de Enseñanza.

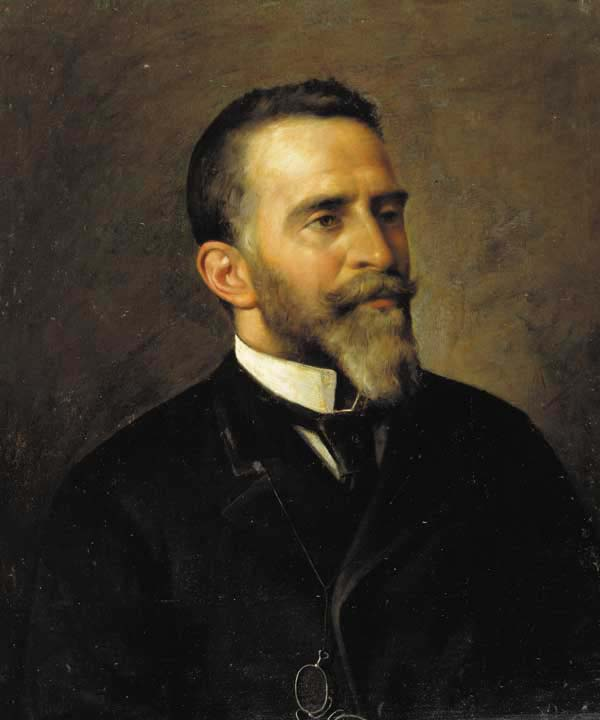
Gumersindo de Azcárate

A determined military effort, led by Martínez Campos, put an end to the Carlist resistance, which was used to abolish the foral system of the three Basque provinces (1876). The survival of the Navarrese fueros was questioned later, in 1893, but a popular mobilization put a stop to such pretensions (gamazada). The conflict in Cuba was redirected, after the arrival on the island of Martínez Campos himself, towards the negotiation of the Peace of Zanjón (1878). The promise of self-government and the application of Moret's anti-slavery law (delayed until 1886) did not materialize in sufficient reforms to avoid the dissatisfaction of the Cuban independence fighters and the frustration of the expectations of the autonomists, which, twenty years later ended up leading to a new war, this time with the decisive intervention of the United States, the so-called disaster of '98. Its internal consequences, beyond the end of most of the colonial empire, were intellectually and politically decisive (regenerationism, generation of '98), opening the so-called crisis of the restoration.

Pantry, school and double key to the tomb of the Cid.

Slogans of Joaquín Costa.

==== Demographic, economic, social and spatial imbalances ====
The last years of the 19th century and the first years of the 20th century marked an economic crisis of great intensity. After the cholera epidemic of 1885, which hit the overcrowded and unhealthy working-class slums, causing mortality to skyrocket to catastrophic levels, a deep agricultural crisis, of climatic and biological origin (poor cereal harvests, phylloxera epidemic, which destroyed the vineyards), was aggravated by the socioeconomic structure of the Spanish countryside, which had not faced mechanization or other transformations of the agricultural revolution, and lasted at least until 1902. Working hours were long and exhausting, with very low wages, sometimes even subjected to piecework. Living conditions deteriorated sharply, with infant mortality rates soaring, while the rest of the demographic data still corresponded to figures typical of a pre-industrial society. Subjected to heavy losses, the landowners were increasingly opposed to the demands of the day laborers, and the confrontation intensified. Thousands of Andalusian day laborers went on strike demanding land. Other regions with a less concentrated property structure were not spared from the social conflicts that accompanied the transformation processes, even reflected in literature, which went from costumbrismo to social denunciation (those of the Valencian horta immortalized by Vicente Blasco Ibáñez, those of Asturias by Leopoldo Alas). Where conditions made it particularly favorable, the escape valve of emigration worked, especially to America, but also to France or Algeria; being particularly intense in Galicia and other areas of northern Spain, where some figures successfully returned (the Indianos) contributed with their prestige to the popularization of the social ideal of enrichment through hard work in distant lands.

The Galician does not ask, he emigrates. Alfonso Rodríguez Castelao.

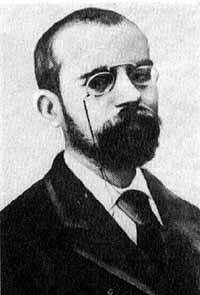
Leopoldo Alas "Clarín".

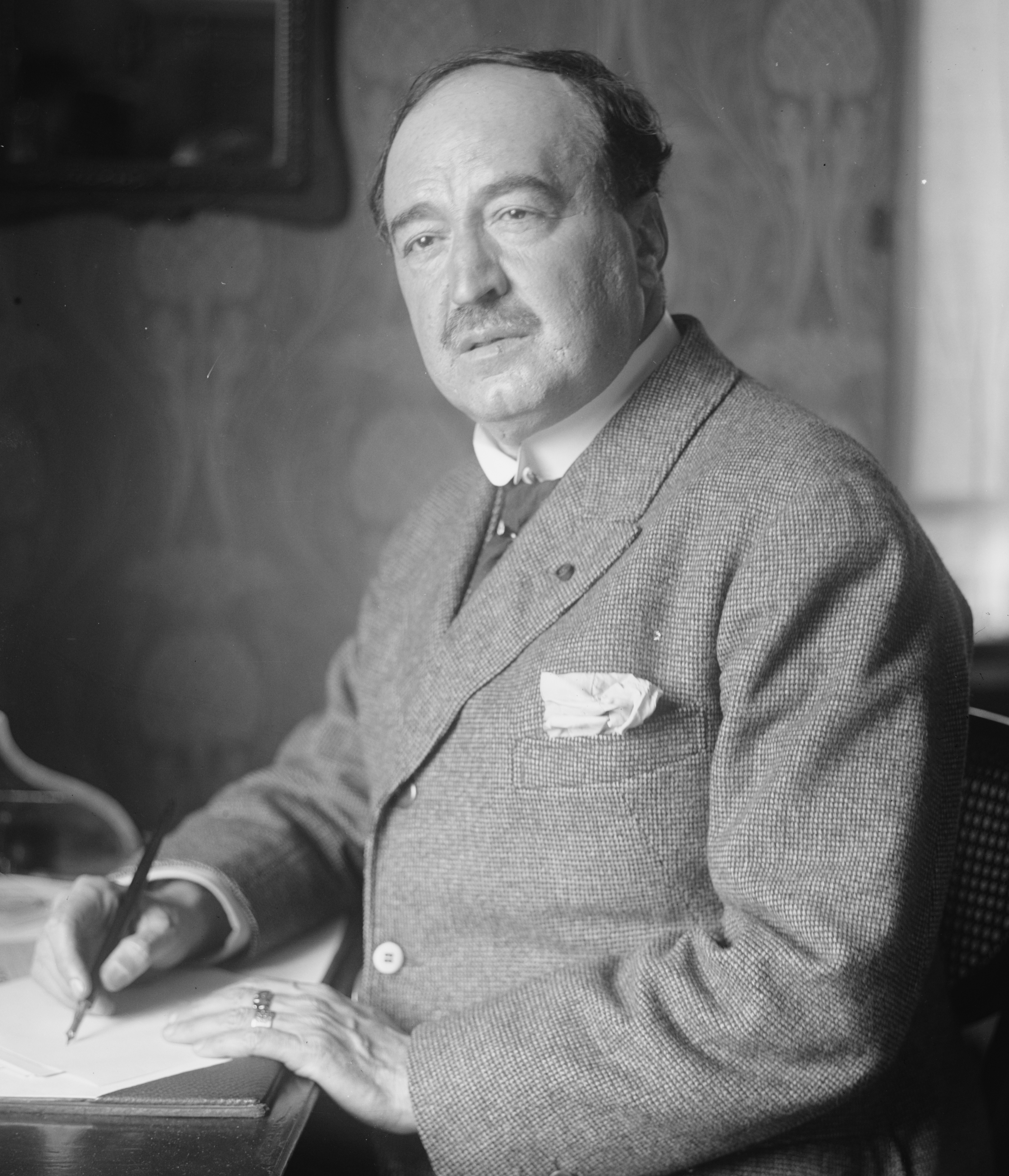
Vicente Blasco Ibáñez.

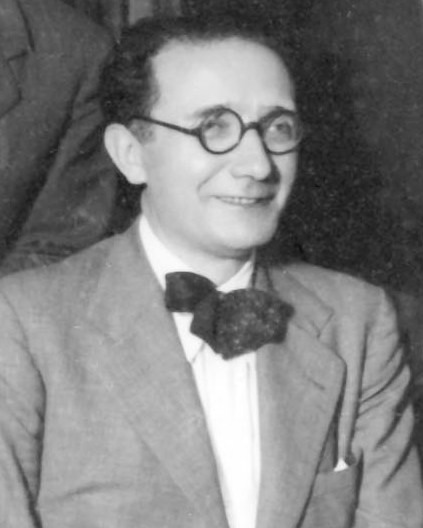
Vicente Blasco Ibáñez.

In the Basque Country there was an industrialization based on iron mining, exported to England through the Bilbao estuary. The convenience of returning with a cargo of English coal led to the creation of a local iron and steel industry, and the flourishing of associated sectors, such as shipbuilding and financial institutions (notably, Basque banking —even Santander banking— was much more solid than Catalan banking). At the same time that the traditional social relations of the Basque countryside (the caserío) went into crisis, leading many to emigrate similar to the Galician, there was an opposite movement of Spanish-speaking emigrants to work in the new industries. The inevitable cultural clash was expressed in all kinds of conflicts and alternative ideologies, such as socialism and Basque nationalism, and in complex personal trajectories, such as those of Miguel de Unamuno, Pío Baroja or Tomás Meabe.

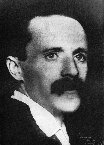
Tomás Meabe was commissioned by Basque nationalism to study Marxism to better combat it. After coming into contact with literature and socialist groups, he joined them.

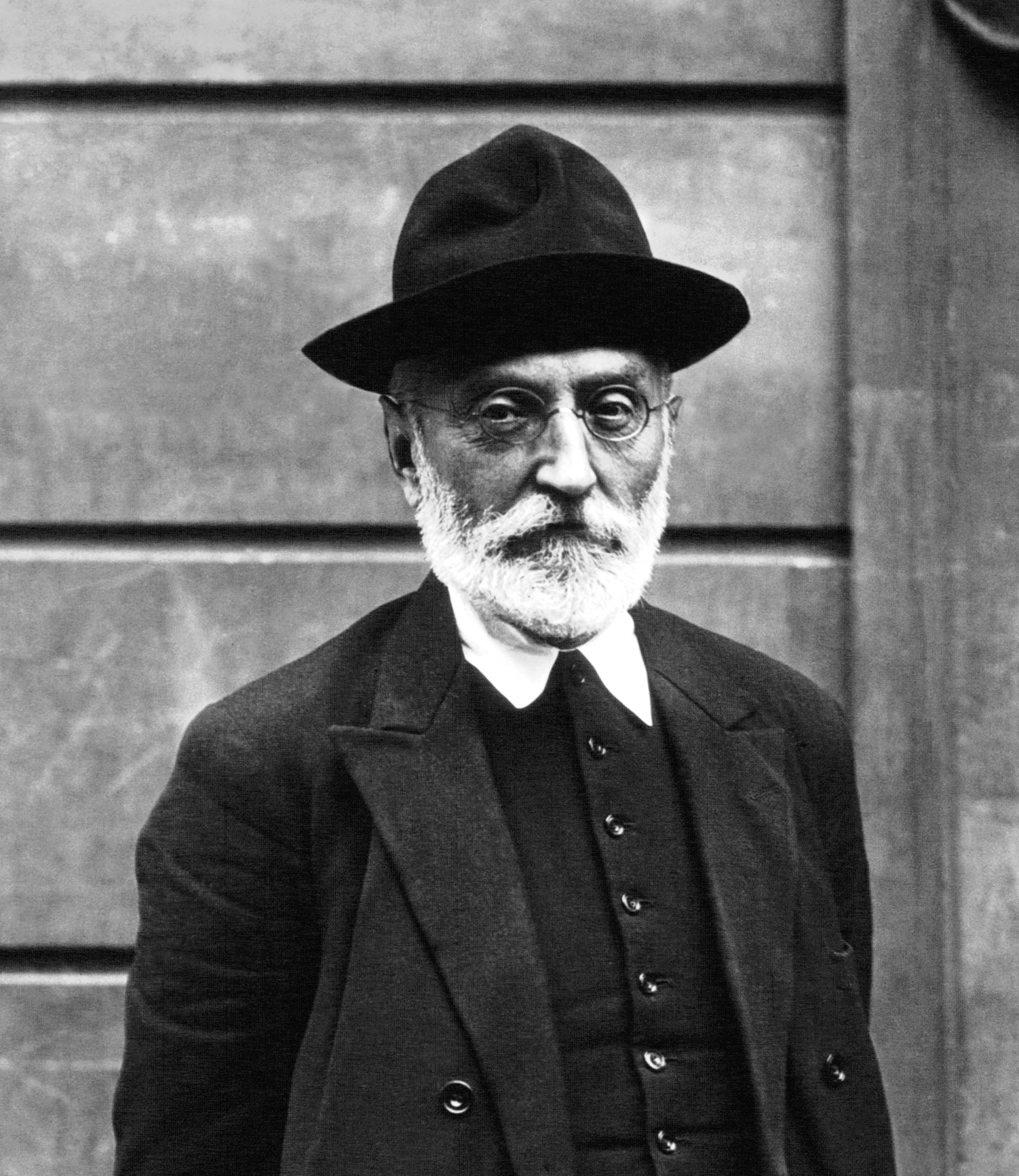
Miguel de Unamuno was initially close to socialism (in his first publications he supported the Bilbao tramway strike), he turned to the search for the Being of Spain in the landscape and the Castilian countryside, which led him to renounce any Europeanization (polemic "Let them invent!" with José Ortega y Gasset), to end his life with a resounding defense of intelligence against fascism.

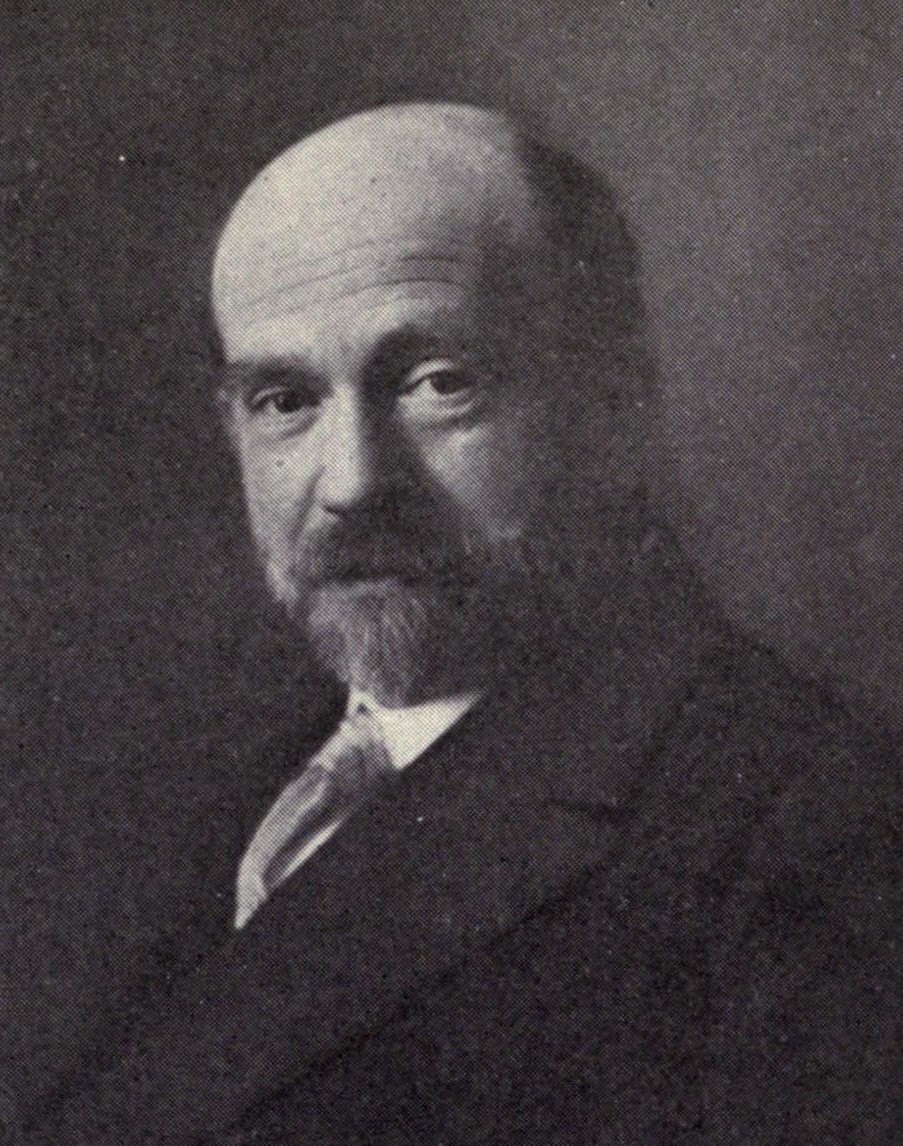
Pío Baroja, who shared with Unamuno the intellectual trajectory of the so-called generation of '98, maintained a more anarchist personality. Trained as a doctor, he proposed radical treatments in politics: Carlism is cured by reading and nationalism by traveling.

The Catalan bourgeoisie was experiencing a gold rush during the Universal Exhibition of 1888, which continued in the midst of a social conflict, the Tragic Week of 1909, the crisis of 1917, and the leaden years of bosses-union pistolerism. The golden age continued until the International Exhibition of 1929. The vitality of Barcelona made the city the economic capital of Spain. The social abyss that separated rich and poor increased the influence of anarchism in Catalonia, with transcendent and prolonged political consequences.

Throughout Spain, the image of anarchism in the eyes of public opinion was strongly marked by the decision of small groups of activists to choose assassination as the most effective propaganda by the deed measure. After the bombing of the Teatro del Liceo (1893), the bombing of the Corpus Christi Procession (1897) and the assassination of Cánovas (1897), there was a failed attempt on the wedding of Alfonso XII (Mateo Morral, 1906) and the assassinations of presidents José Canalejas (1912) and Eduardo Dato (1921).

Social transformations, as in the rest of Europe, stimulated a minority of women to demand their incorporation into different spheres of cultural life, provoking all kinds of rejections and obstacles that delayed it. Concepción Arenal had to attend law classes disguised as a man; Cecilia Böhl de Faber had to hide under the very masculine pseudonym of Fernán Caballero; while cases like that of María de la O Lejárraga were even more humiliating (she was the author of many of the works signed by her husband Gregorio Martínez Sierra). Subject to special authorization between 1880 and 1910, the presence of women in the university remained a rarity until the 1930s. The literary world accepted them in dribs and drabs (Rosalía de Castro, Emilia Pardo Bazán, Concha Espina, Carmen de Burgos). Their incorporation of the lower classes into industrial work was much earlier, subject to lower wages than men.

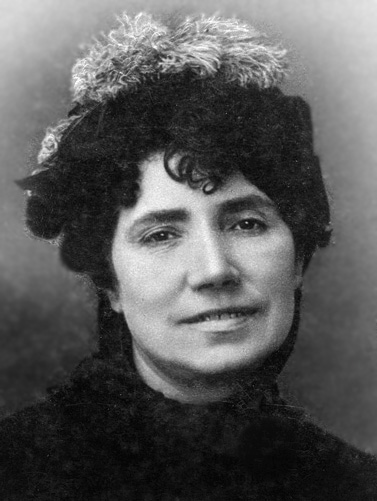
Rosalía de Castro.

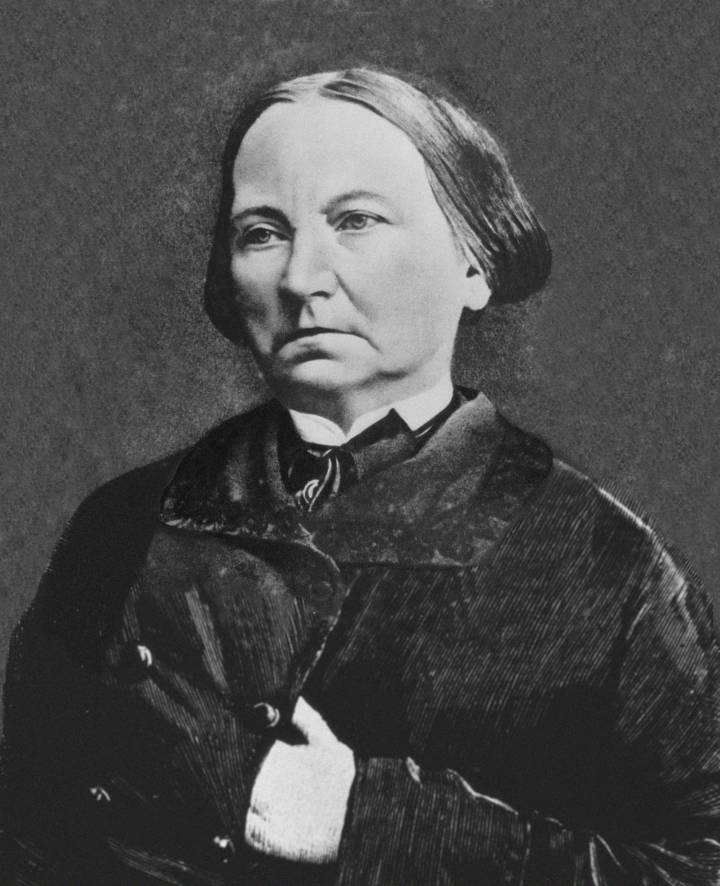
Concepción Arenal.

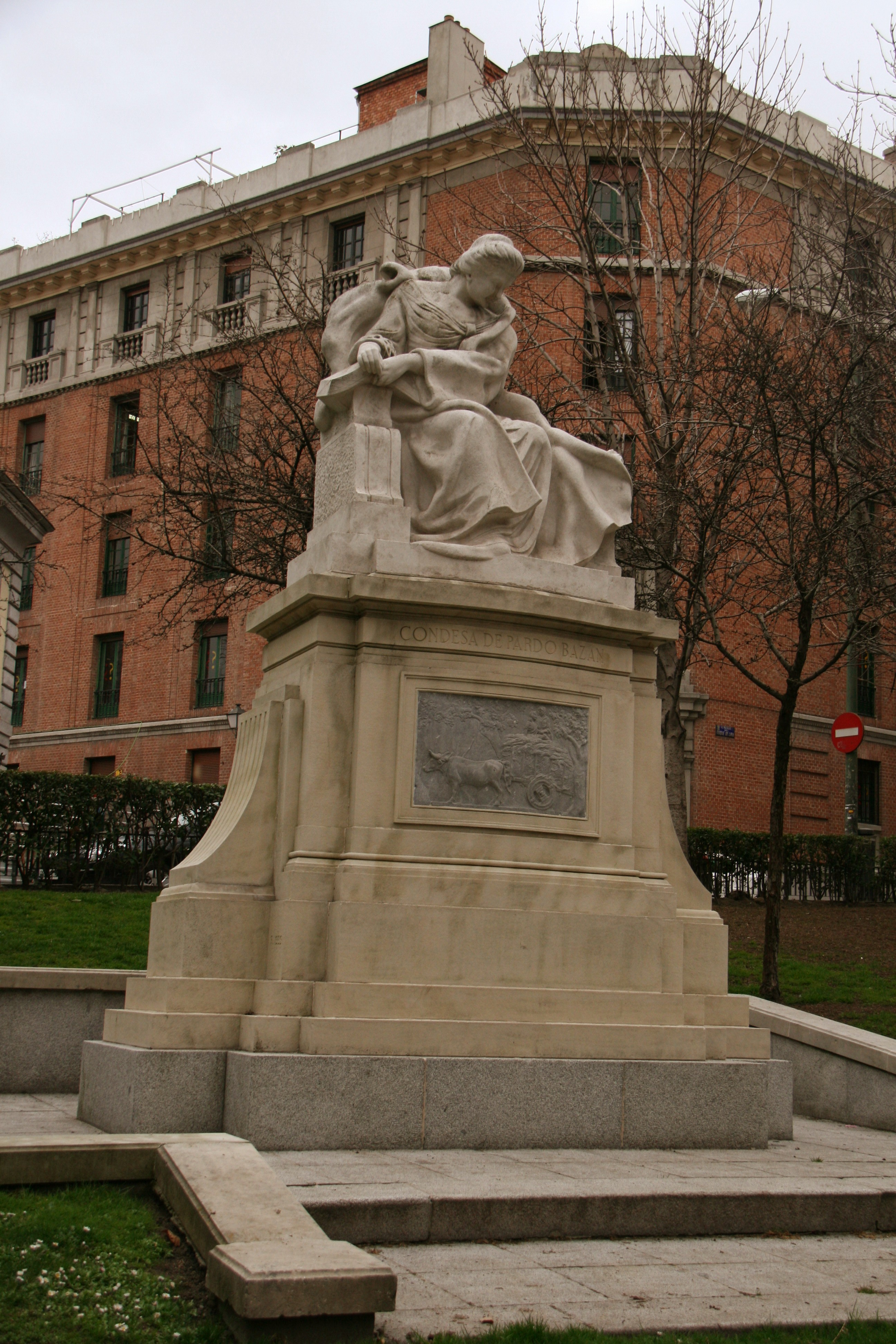
Monument to Emilia Pardo Bazán.

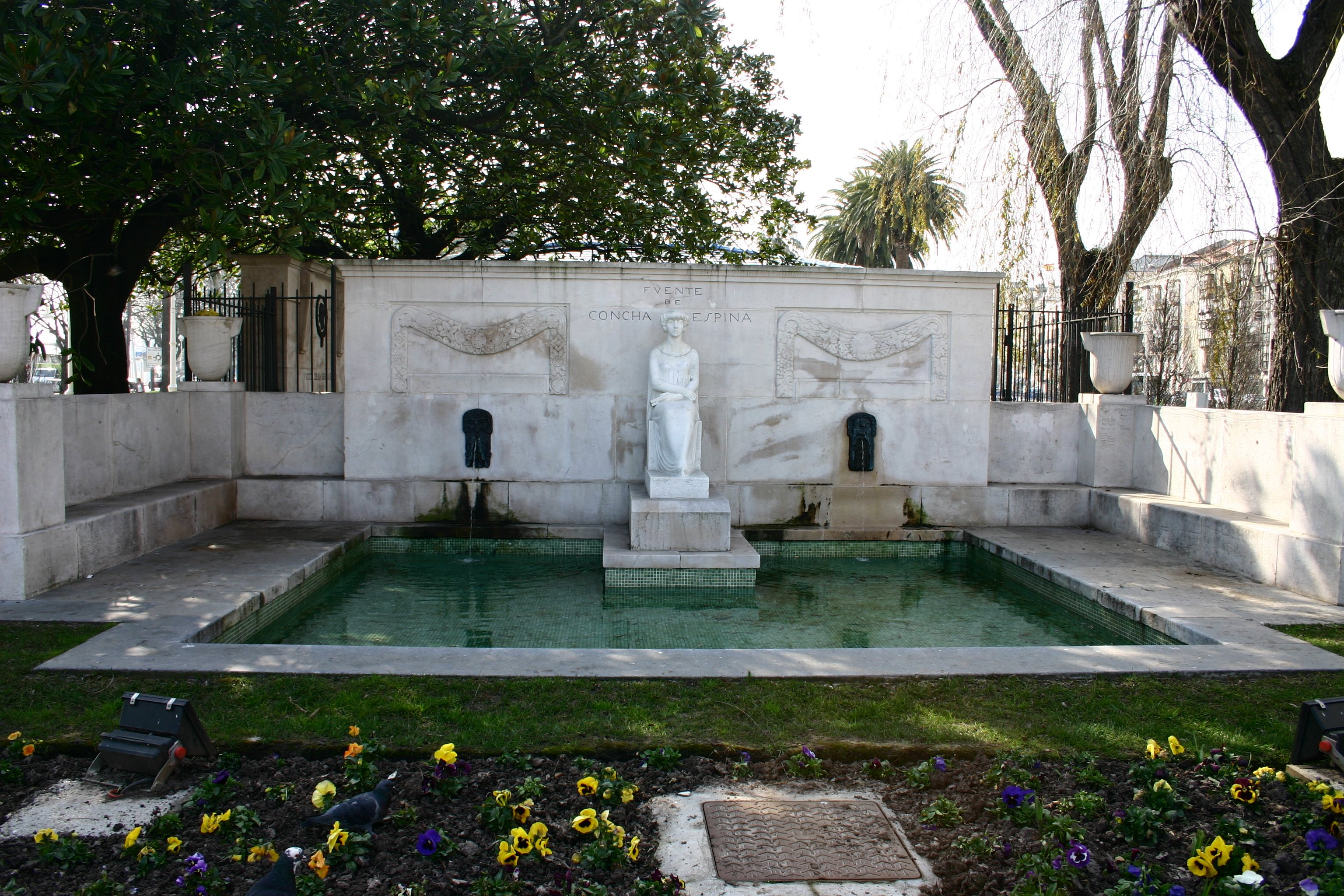
Monument to Concha Espina

=== Reign of Alfonso XIII (1902–1931) ===
==== The Constitutional Period (1902–1923) ====
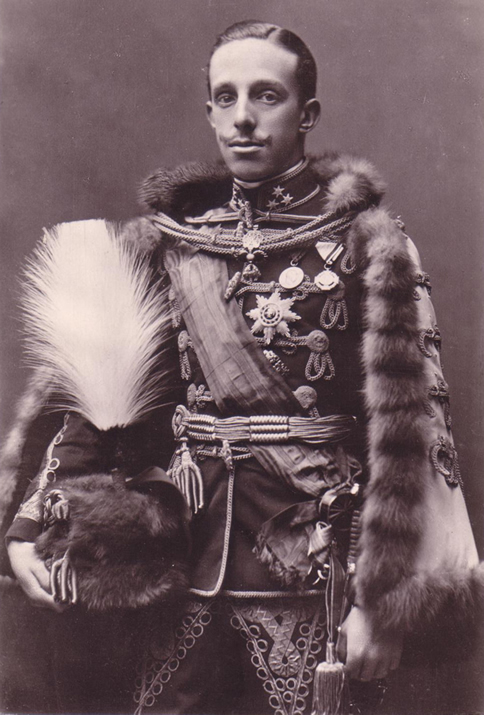
Alfonso XIII of Spain

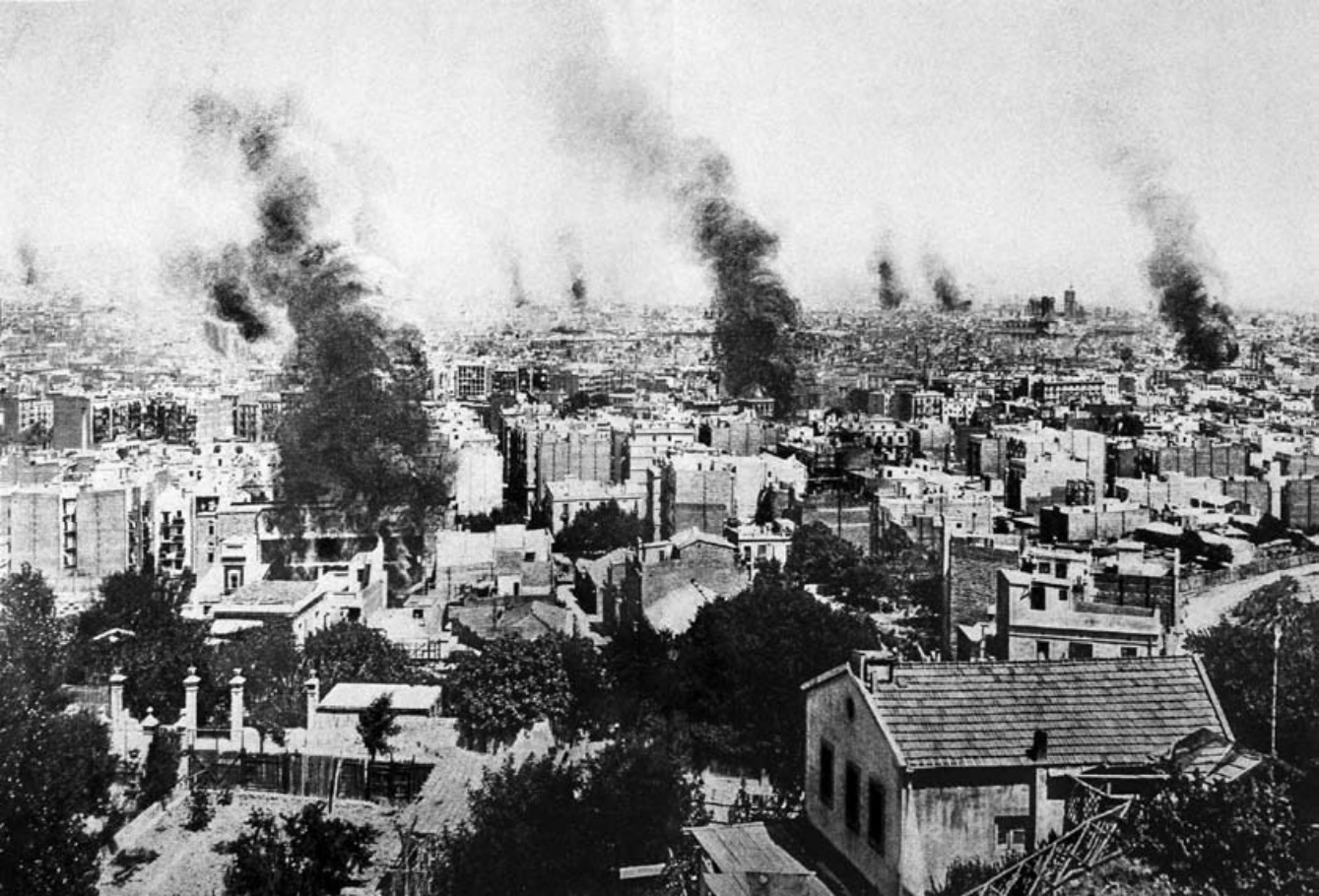
Barcelona became the burned city during the Tragic Week (1909)

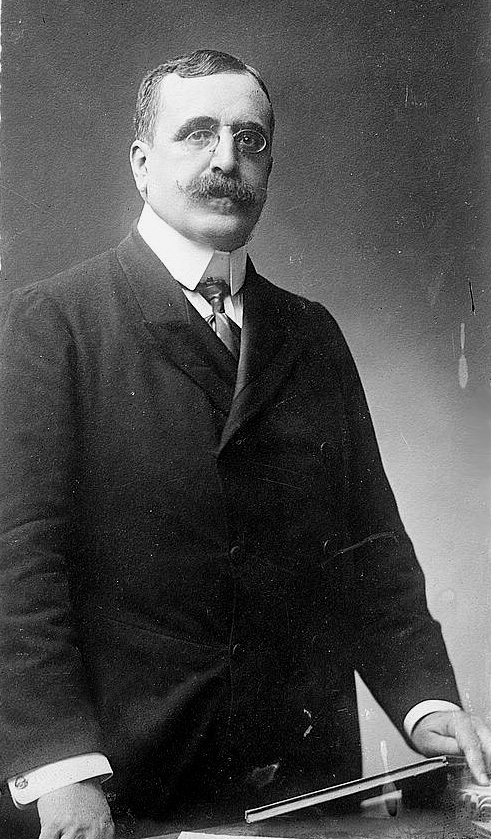
José Canalejas

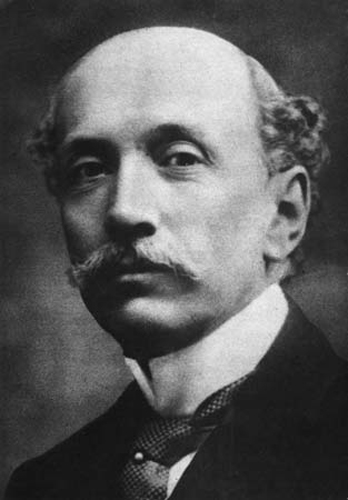
Eduardo Dato

===== Beginnings of the reign =====
Political instability caused a rapid succession of conservative and liberal governments, and within each party there were all kinds of splits, dissensions and intrigues. The spirit of regenerationism prevailed in the adoption of reformist economic and social decisions, with measures such as the Law of Interior Repopulation of 1907 (Augusto González Besada) and a plan of reservoirs to triple irrigation (application of the hydraulic policy of Joaquín Costa or Lucas Mallada); delayed by the lack of economic resources that were disputed with the support of a disproportionate army (more commanders than soldiers) and the reconstruction of a navy that no longer had an empire to defend. In 1908 the Instituto Nacional de Previsión was launched, the germ of the social protection policies typical of a social state like the one that had been implemented in Bismarck's Germany.

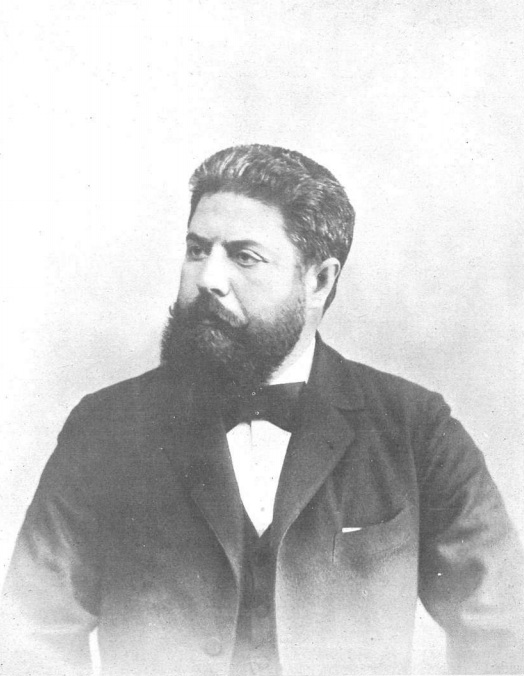
Joaquín Costa

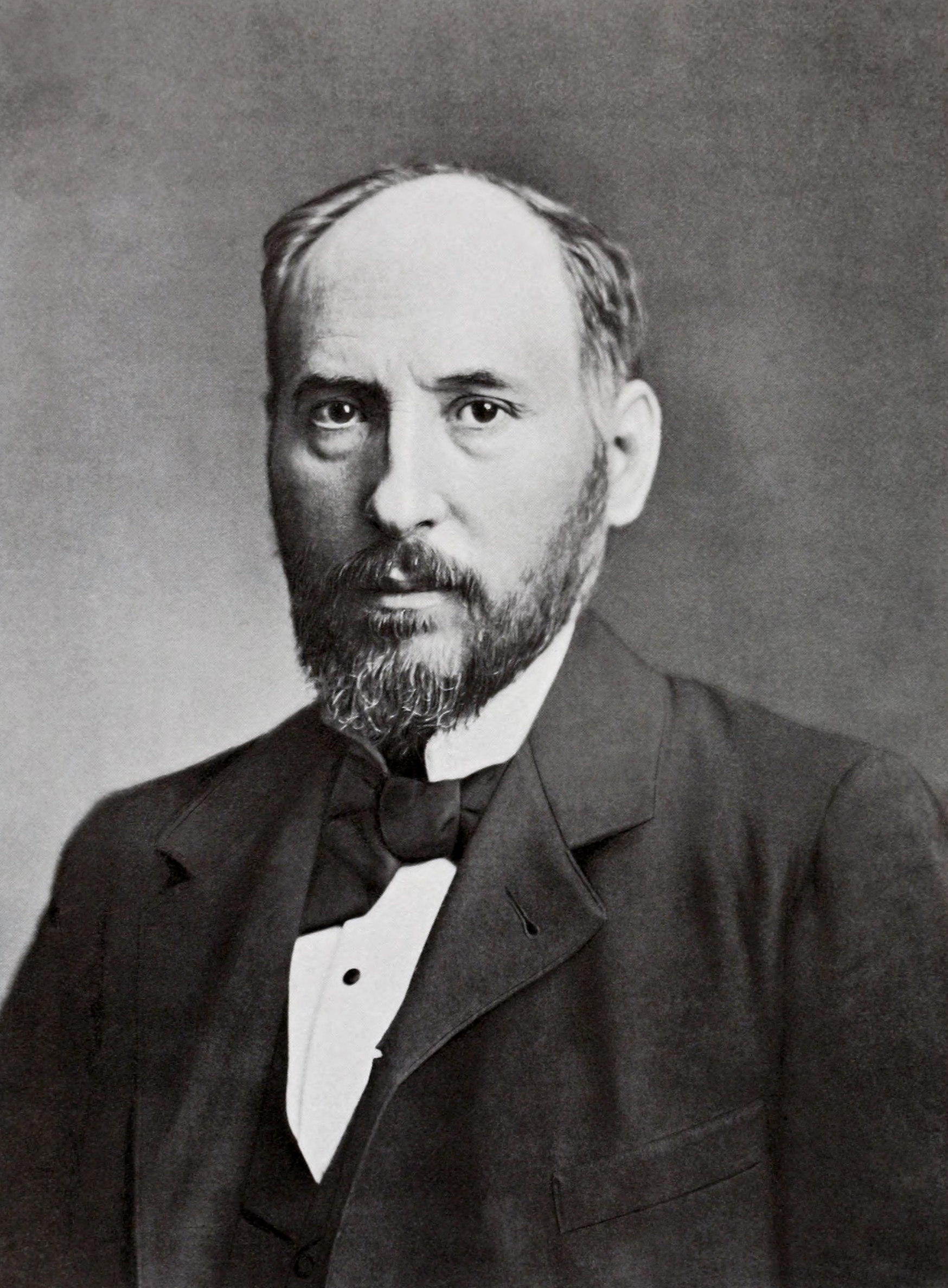
Santiago Ramón y Cajal

The field of science, education and culture experienced a significant boost, to such an extent that from 1906 (the year in which the Nobel Prize for medicine was awarded to Santiago Ramón y Cajal) it is possible to refer to a silver age of Spanish science and literature that would last for thirty years (until the Civil War). In 1900, the Ministry of Education was created, obliging the State to assume the salary of teachers. In 1907 the Junta para Ampliación de Estudios was created, an institutionist-oriented scientific research body presided over by the recently awarded. The workers' movement itself was oriented towards popular education (the libertarian athenaeums, the anarchist modern schools and the socialist casa del pueblo).

===== Tragic Week and Canalejas' reforms =====
After the disaster of 1898, the only way out of Spanish imperialism was the Africanist approach. An intense diplomatic activity led to obtain a colonial presence in the protectorate of Morocco, which was obtained precisely because of the opportuneness for the European powers to grant to Spain, a power of little consideration, precisely what would be threatening to grant to Germany or France (Treaty of Algeciras, April 7, 1906). The demand for a new military effort led to the mobilization of large contingents of compulsory recruits (with the unjust system of quintas and the exclusion of those who paid the quota of 6000 reales). The anti-military mobilizations provoked a serious uprising in Barcelona in July 1909 (the Tragic Week), which threatened to spread and had to be put down with the army and the call-up of reservists. The riots had a strong anticlerical component, promoted by the radical leader Alejandro Lerroux (young barbarians), with the burning of convents and churches. The conservative government of Antonio Maura declared a state of emergency throughout the country, and thousands of people were arrested, subjected to military jurisdiction and court-martialed. The most notorious was that of Francisco Ferrer Guardia, creator of the anarchist modern schools. In spite of the protests of international public opinion, the sentence was carried out, condemning him to death as responsible for the instigation of the riots (October 13). The pressure on Maura forced him to resign (October 21).

The turn of the liberals brought to the government José Canalejas, who tried to stop the popular demands by means of legislative reforms, like the obligatory military service that would put an end to the injustice of the quota soldier and would stop the growing antimilitarism, and the attempt to stop the growing anticlericalism reinforcing the secular character of the State. Faced with the papal refusal to negotiate the Concordat of 1851, he opted to unilaterally limit the activity of the religious orders (Law of the Padlock, December 1910). The social orientation of the governmental measures included the substitution of consumption by a progressive tax on urban incomes and a boost to primary education. However, when faced with social outbreaks, he did not hesitate to use firm measures, as in the militarization that put an end to the railroad strike of 1912.

===== World War I and Crisis of 1917 =====
Spain's neutrality in World War I (1914–1918), questioned by Alliedophiles (more numerous on the left) and Germanophiles (more numerous on the right), brought about a significant increase in the demand for all kinds of products destined for export, despite the political option for industrial protectionism promoted by the Catalans of the Liga, who had achieved a relatively important share of political power and local autonomy (Mancomunitat Catalana, 1913) and aspired to be decisive in national politics (Francesc Cambó). Prices rose due to the increase in exports, while wages did not rise at the same rate, producing a substantial decrease in the purchasing capacity of the workers while businessmen saw their profit margins increase. Social inequalities intensified union membership in the General Union of Workers (UGT, socialist) and the National Confederation of Labor (CNT, anarchist, founded in 1910).

The crisis of 1917 broke out as a consequence of four serious problems: the political problem (inadequacy of the institutions to an increasingly modern society and an increasingly conscious public opinion, especially in urban areas not subject to caciquism), the economic-social problem (decline in the quality of life and intensification of workers' demands), the military problem (dissatisfaction of the middle and lower officers with the promotion policy and the decrease in real salaries), and the Catalan problem (increase in regionalist pressure, responded to by the pressure of the Spanish military since the Cu-Cut! affair of 1905). An assembly of deputies meeting in Barcelona raised the possibility of an alternative to the dynastic parties and the regeneration of the political regime. Simultaneously there was a general strike (called by the UGT and supported by the CNT). The conservative government of Eduardo Dato responded with repression, sending to prison or exile the leaders of the protests (the socialists Francisco Largo Caballero, Julián Besteiro, Indalecio Prieto, Andrés Saborit and Daniel Anguiano or the republican Marcelino Domingo —all of them with a great political future—). A government of liberal and conservative concentration was formed, and the following elections yielded uncertain results.

The end of the economic cycle coincided with the end of World War I and the demographic catastrophe of the so-called Spanish flu (the Spanish press, unlike that of the belligerent countries, was not subject to war censorship and could report on the epidemic). Nevertheless, at that point in the 20th century, the demographic figures of the "normal" years already corresponded to those of a demographic transition that had begun, with a growing urban population; and the data on the economic structure to those of a country immersed in a process of industrialization, with most of the labor force available to the market, beyond the village circuits of self-sufficiency, although with a clear relative backwardness, far from the levels of development that had already turned some countries into true consumer societies.

I go to work, with my money I pay for the suit that covers me

the suit that covers me and the mansion I live in,

the bread that feeds me and the bed where I lie.

Antonio Machado, Portrait.

===== Crisis of the Restoration (1917–1923) =====
An imprudent military maneuver in Africa, personally supported by the king, led to the disaster of Annual (July 22, 1921, with nearly ten thousand dead). The parliamentary investigation of the scandal (Picasso File) threatened to destabilize the centers of power of the Canovist system: the monarchy and the army.

Simultaneously, there was an upsurge of social conflicts, both in urban and rural areas: the so-called Bolshevik triennium in Andalusia (strikes and peasant revolts that led to the declaration of a state of war in May 1919) and the years of lead in Barcelona (characterized by the pistolerismo of the employers and the direct action or anarchist violence of groups of workers, and the policy of harsh repression against them by Governor Severiano Martínez Anido, which made Catalan social life increasingly rarefied). Among all these events was the La Canadiense strike, carried out by the CNT, which led Spain to become one of the first countries to establish the eight-hour working day.

The captain general of Barcelona, Miguel Primo de Rivera, staged a coup d'état on September 13, 1923, with the immediate acceptance of the king, without strong opposition reactions in either the political or social sphere, while the intellectuals were divided: opposition by Unamuno (who was exiled) and acceptance by Ortega.

... I acted on my own initiative. I had no accomplices. I considered that if I achieved my goal of killing the king, I would provoke a revolution in Spain. It was not out of personal hatred for the sovereign that I intended to carry out my actions, because I respect him as a man but not as a king and I believe that his disappearance could help to save Spain. Confession of Buenaventura Durruti to the French police, June 1926.

==== Dictatorship of Primo de Rivera (1923–1930) ====
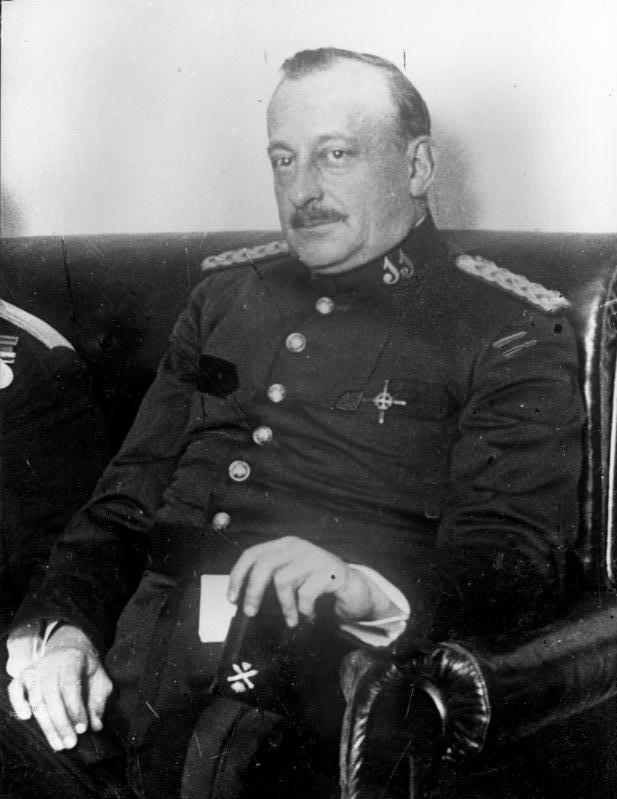
The dictator Miguel Primo de Rivera

In the first years of the dictatorship, it received all kinds of social support, from the Catalan bourgeoisie to the UGT of Largo Caballero, while the dynastic parties accepted the suspension of the Constitution. The popularity of the regime was strengthened with a military solution, in the form of a large-scale operation, to the problem of Morocco, with French help: the landing of Al Hoceima (September 8, 1925). Strategic sectors were nationalized, such as the oil and telephone sectors, in which large monopoly companies were established (Campsa and the Compañía Telefónica Nacional). An ambitious policy of public works with a regenerationist spirit (construction of roads and reservoirs, irrigation, reforestation) boosted employment and economic activity, once social peace had been forcibly established. These seemed to be the therapeutic virtues of the iron surgeon predicted by Joaquín Costa.

Over time, the regime drifted towards a corporativism that in some extremes was reminiscent of Mussolini's fascist Italy, even with the creation of a political movement with the vocation of a single party (a political party, but apolitical: the Patriotic Union). The replacement of the initial military directory by a civil directory (December 3, 1925), which included politicians from outside the traditional parties (José Calvo Sotelo, Galo Ponte, Eduardo Callejo), initiated an institutionalization of the regime (foundation of the National Corporate Organization (1926), convocation of a National Consultative Assembly (1927), beginning of the drafting of a new constitutional text —the Constitution of 1929, which was never completed—) that increasingly showed more intentions of prolonging itself in time, as opposed to its initial pretended provisionality.

The poor management of the monetary policy prevented the development of the public works program, and the economic difficulties added to the loss of popularity of the dictator, increasingly criticized by a growing opposition, especially among the university youth, intellectuals and the workers' movement; while a political conspiracy was being forged between the Republican and Socialist parties. Faced with the lack of support, Primo de Rivera's situation became untenable, and he opted to resign and go into exile (January 28, 1930).

==== Dictablanda and final crisis of the monarchy (1930–1931) ====
The government was entrusted to general Berenguer. The discredit of the new government was immediate: a resounding article by one of the most prominent intellectuals, José Ortega y Gasset (El error Berenguer —El Sol, November 15, 1930—), ended with a resounding delenda est monarchia. The pro-Republican uprising of a military unit in Jaca on December 12, 1930, was put down, but the execution by firing squad of the two main perpetrators (Fermín Galán and Ángel García Hernández) had a great impact on public opinion. Ortega, supported by a select group (Ramón Pérez de Ayala and Gregorio Marañón) created the Agrupación al Servicio de la República, presided over by Antonio Machado. Its first public act (February 14, 1931) was followed by the resignation of Berenguer.

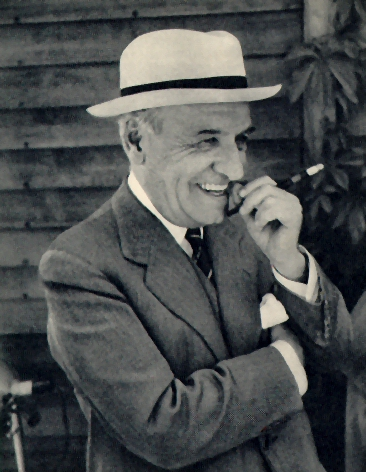
José Ortega y Gasset

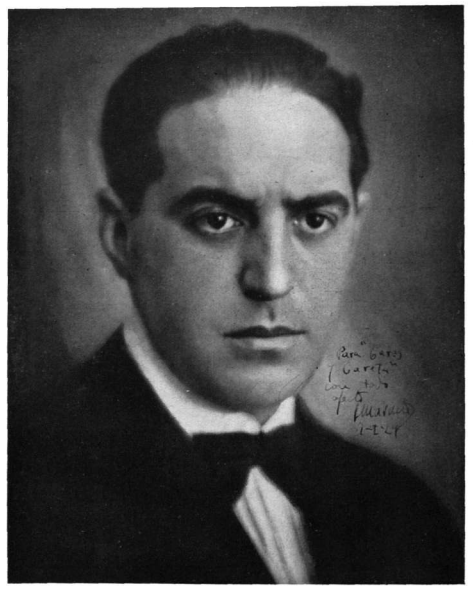
Gregorio Marañón

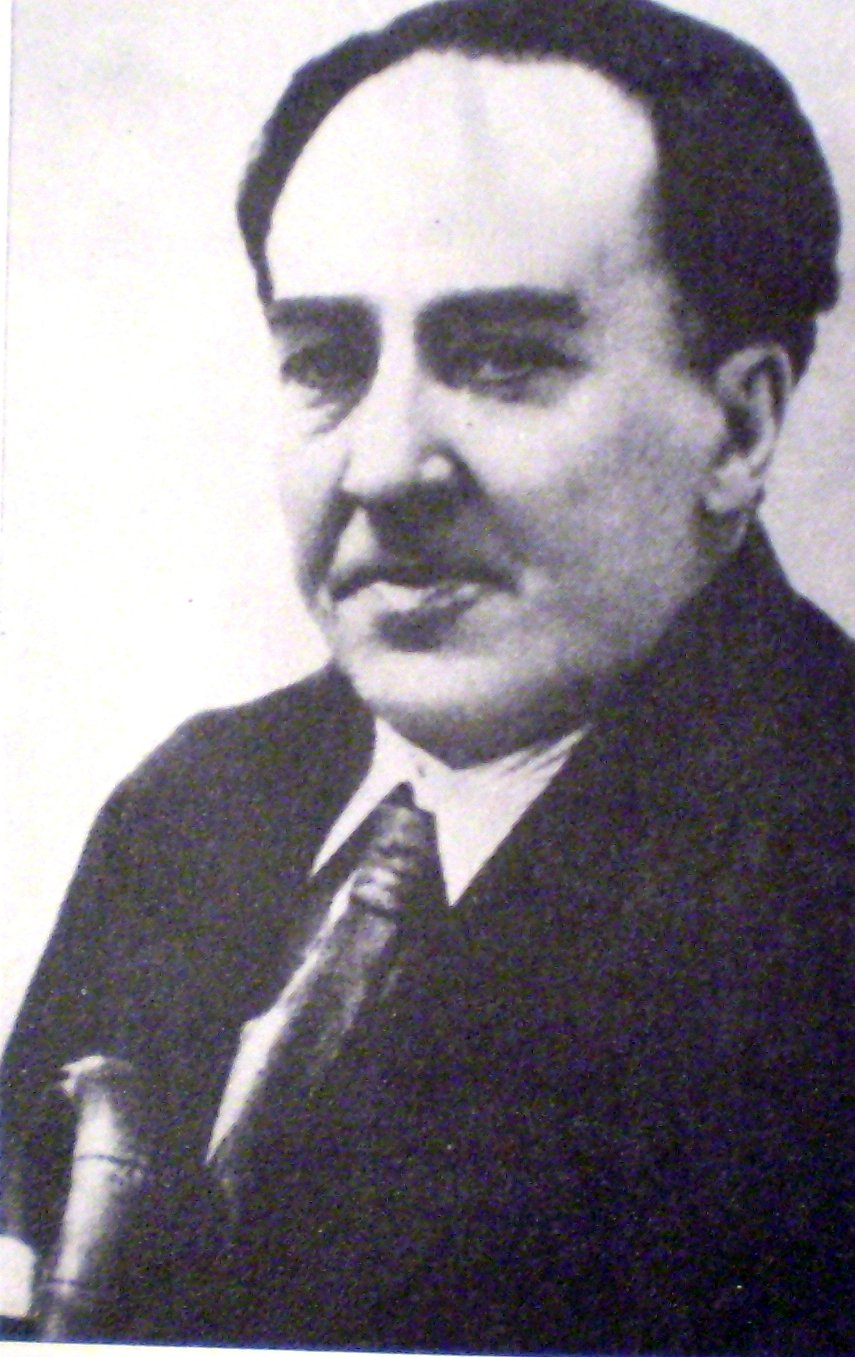
Antonio Machado

The unity of action of the Republican politicians of different orientations, starting with the Pact of San Sebastián (August 17, 1930), allowed them to challenge with advantage the increasingly weak government and to offer themselves as a credible alternative for power.

In this context, the new president, Admiral Aznar, opted for a gradual reestablishment of democratic practices, beginning with the holding of municipal elections on April 12, a political scenario more prone to the recomposition of the traditional control of the clientelist networks over local power. The republican parties and the PSOE formed an electoral bloc which received the support of the UGT. In Catalonia, the dynastic parties allied themselves with the Liga, while the national opposition parties were joined by the recently created Esquerra Republicana de Catalunya (Francesc Macià). The CNT applied the anarchist ideological orthodoxy, that considered it counterproductive to intervene in the bourgeois political institutions; while the Communist Party of Spain (in Spanish: Partido Comunista de España, PCE, split from the PSOE as a result of the formation of the pro-Soviet Third International) was still a party of very little entity. In spite of the fact that both in number of votes and in number of town councils the monarchist candidates won, nobody could hide the fact that most of the constituencies (villages subjected to caciquism and without real freedom of vote), could not be considered in the same way as the cities, where the republican-socialist lists won comfortably. In view of the results, on April 14, in a festive and popular atmosphere, the crowd filled the streets of all the cities waving tricolor flags (the republican flag replaced the red lower band with a purple one), while prominent republican politicians, faced with the overflow and inaction of the authorities, took control of public buildings proclaiming the Republic. The king chose not to force a repressive response that would not have had the support of the army or the dynastic parties, and went into exile, renouncing the exercise of his powers without formally abdicating.

== Second Spanish Republic (1931–1939) ==
=== First biennium, "social-Azañista", reformist or transformer ===
A provisional government presided by Niceto Alcalá Zamora was established, formed by republicans of different ideologies, including socialists. On June 28, 1931, elections to the constituent Parliament resulted in a chamber dominated by left-wing Republican parties, together with the PSOE, which imposed a secularist and socially advanced orientation, leading to the resignation of Alcalá Zamora and the formation of a new government presided over by Manuel Azaña (October 14, 1931). An attempt was made to maintain the institutional balance by naming Alcalá Zamora president of the Republic (December 10 of the same year).

The 1931 Constitution recognized a wide range of political and social rights, such as women's suffrage, the institution of mixed juries of employers and workers in parity for the resolution of labor disputes. By subordinating private property to the interests of the national economy, it responded to the need for an agrarian reform (substantiated in the Law of September 9, 1932) which provided for the expropriation with compensation of farms considered not to be exploited with sufficient social profitability (such as most of the large estates in southern Spain), for the benefit of landless day laborers. The total separation Church-State was expressed in a complete religious freedom, in the suppression of the cult and clergy budget (a concession to the Catholic Church since the Concordat of 1851, which remedied the deprivation of resources due to the confiscation by paying salaries to bishops and priests), in the prohibition of formal teaching to the religious orders and in the suppression of the Society of Jesus (based on its vow of special obedience to the Pope). The new institutional design placed the executive power in the hands of a president of the republic who appointed the president of a government responsible to a unicameral legislature. The new territorial structure recognized the right to autonomy within a so-called integral State, which resulted in the constitution of the Generality of Catalonia on August 2. Special jurisdictions were abolished (such as the military, which had been exercised over civilians since 1906), the jury was extended and the formation of a Court of Constitutional Guarantees was envisaged.

The reform of the army, an institution unbalanced by the large number of officers, implied the closure of the General Academy of Zaragoza. The military discontent, to which was added that of the Civil Guard, led General Sanjurjo to carry out the failed coup d'état of 1932, of a monarchist character and which also adduced as a cause the anticlerical drift of the Republic, exemplified in the burning of convents. From the other end of the political spectrum, the anarchist leaders of the CNT and the FAI imposed the tactic of permanent pressure through strikes and other mobilizations, especially violent in the countryside. Serious confrontations took place, such as the events of Gilena, Castilblanco, Arnedo and Casas Viejas; whose management would undermine the social-anarchist government to the point of forcing the dissolution of the chamber and the calling of the elections of November 1933, in which the anarchists showed their indifference to the republican regime by abstaining. It had also been argued (Victoria Kent and Clara Campoamor debate) that the exercise for the first time of women's suffrage would give the right the vote of many women, influenced in a decisive way by the opinion expressed by priests from the pulpit and the confessional. The parties that obtained the most seats were the bloc of the Confederación Española de Derechas Autónomas (CEDA) of José María Gil-Robles and the Partido Radical of Alejandro Lerroux (very far from the radicalism that characterized him at the beginning of the century), which reached a government agreement.

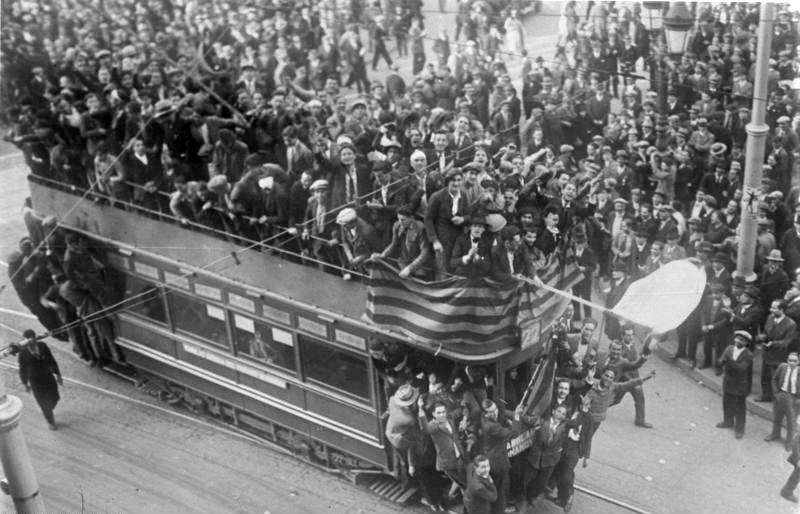
Celebrations in Barcelona after the proclamation of the Republic on April 14, 1931.

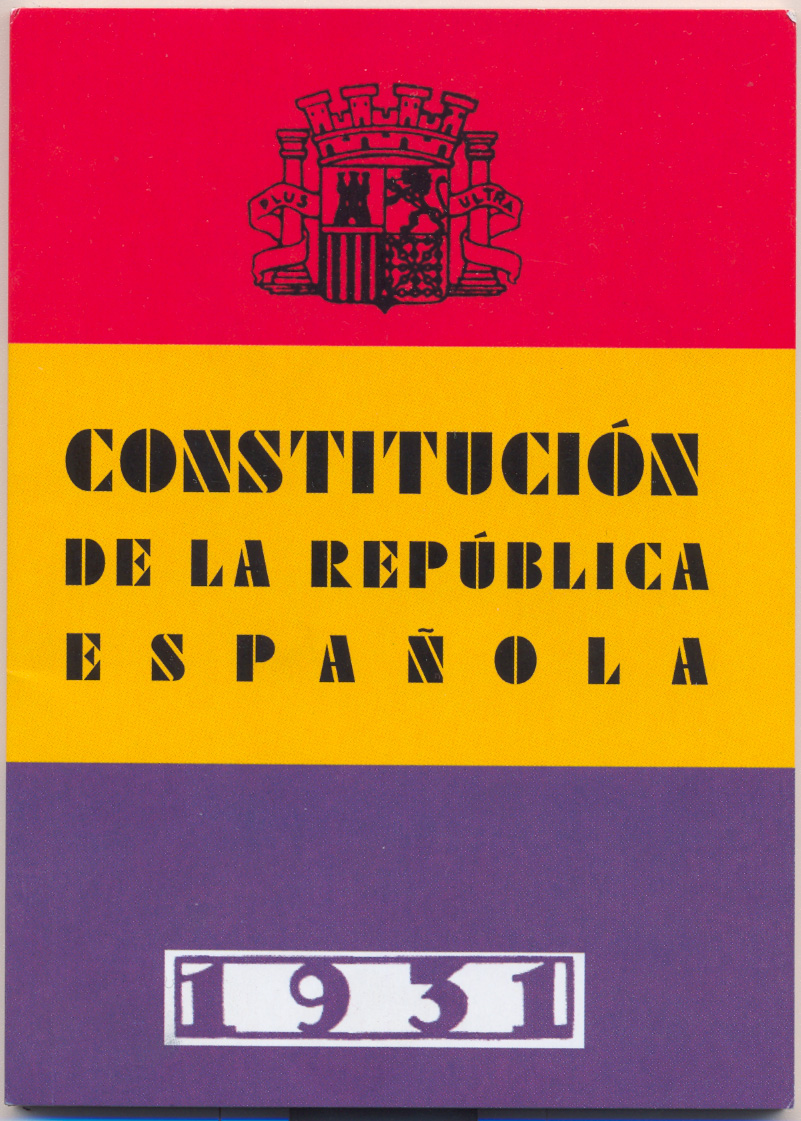
Cover of a copy of the Constitution of the Spanish Republic of 1931

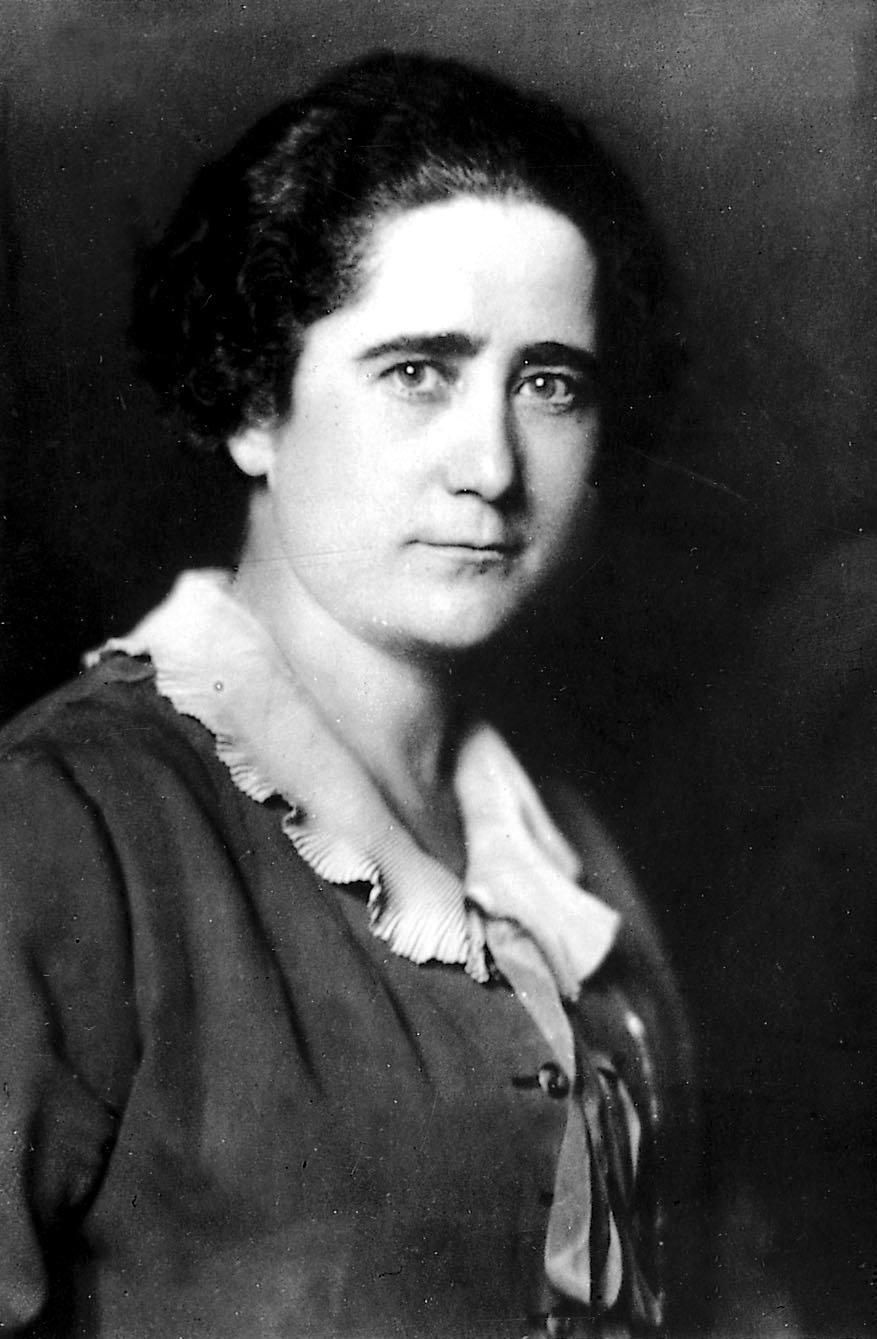
Clara Campoamor

==== Second biennium, "radical-cedista" or "black" ====
The reforms that had begun in the first biennium were radically interrupted by the cedista government. The application of the Agrarian Reform Law was stopped; amnesty was granted to the coup plotters of 1932 (Sanjurjo, Juan March, etc.); and the law of the Catalan Generalitat favorable to the rabassaires was vetoed. The Republican left and the workers' movement feared that the incorporation of Gil-Robles into the government would mean, as had happened with Hitler's in Germany, the establishment of a fascist system despite its democratic origin. The insurrection of October 1934, promoted by the PSOE, supported by the anarchists, and which in Catalonia had the institutional support of the autonomous government, of Esquerra Republicana (which went even further, proclaiming the Catalan State within the Spanish Federal Republic, October 6), failed throughout Spain except in Asturias, where the miners took over the cities. The government entrusted the repression to the African army, led by Francisco Franco, which put an expeditious end to the revolt; in addition to the numerous dead and wounded, thousands of workers, trade unionists and politicians of left-wing parties were imprisoned. The end of the period was affected by a corruption scandal (the "estraperlo" fraud) which caused parliamentary difficulties for Lerroux's party, causing it to disintegrate, which forced an early election.

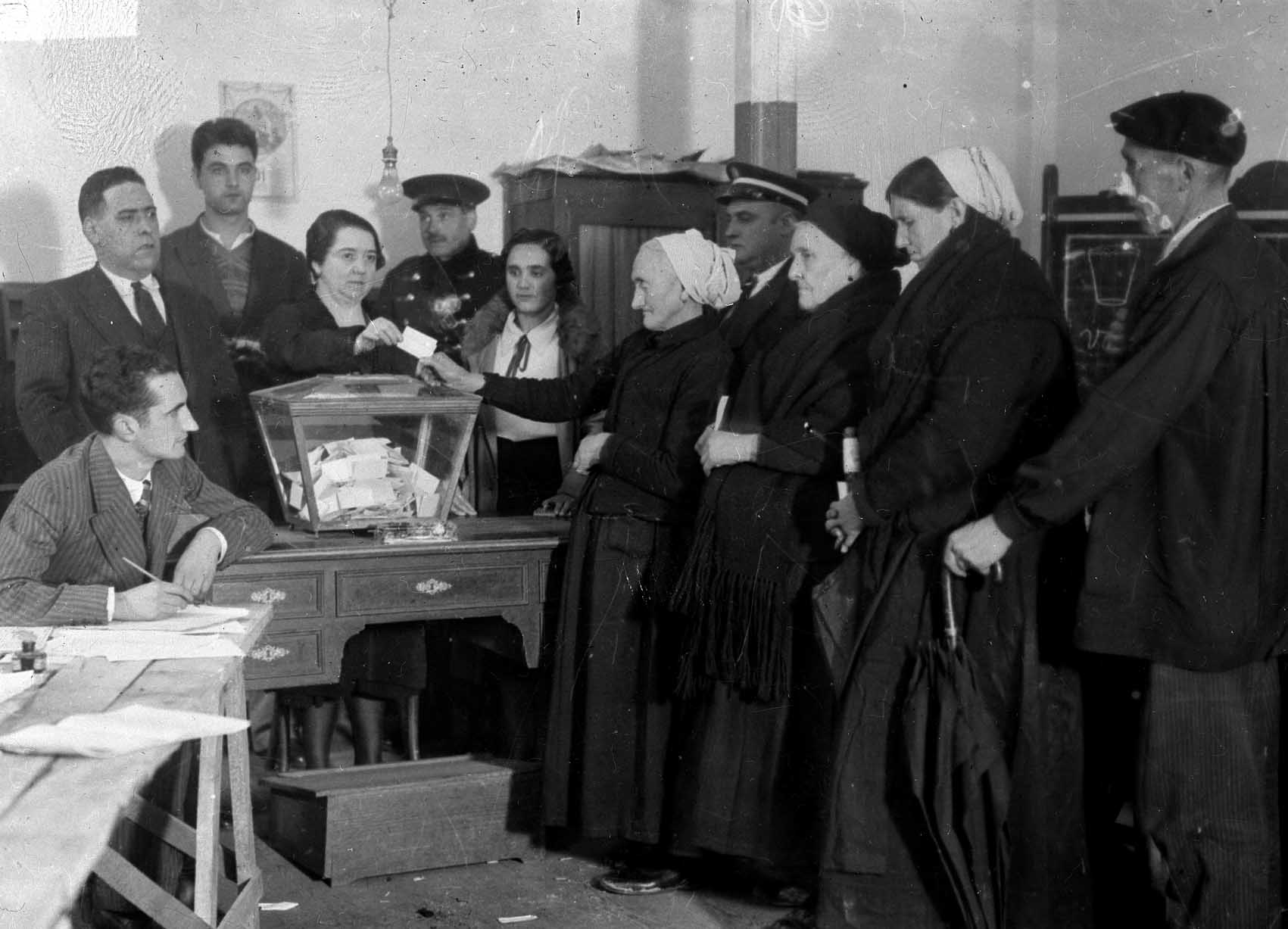
Voting in Eibar on November 5, 1933.

=== Popular Front (February to July 1936) ===
In imitation of France where a Front Populaire had reached the government (the popular-front strategy, designed by Dimitrov and Stalin in the Komintern, responded to the need to stop fascism by electoral means by bringing together antifascist parties from a wide area of the political spectrum), in Spain, under the same name of Popular Front, an electoral coalition was formed that won the elections of February 1936. Despite the small distance in votes, the electoral system produced a large majority of deputies from the PSOE, Izquierda Republicana and the rest of the coalition parties. Alcalá Zamora was dismissed by the new chamber as president of the Republic (April 7), and Manuel Azaña was elected to replace him (May 11), a change identical in persons to that which took place in the presidency of the government in 1931. Previously (February 19) a government presided over by Azaña had been formed with Republican ministers among whom no Socialists were appointed (whose parliamentary support was essential, but who were internally divided between the more moderate tendency of Indalecio Prieto and the more radical one of Francisco Largo Caballero).

The Catalan Generalitat was re-established and the reforms paralyzed by the radical-cedista biennium were unblocked, among them the procedures to give autonomy statutes to Galicia and the Basque Country. Labor confrontations and public disorder were on the rise. A new wave of anticlerical riots broke out again. Since April 14 (fifth anniversary of the proclamation of the Republic) violent demonstrations and counter-demonstrations followed one after another, resulting in deaths due to a spiral of personal and political revenge. On June 15, 1936, Gil-Robles denounced the serious situation in a parliamentary speech:

160 churches destroyed, 251 assaults on temples, smothered fires, destruction, attempted assaults. 269 dead. 1287 wounded of varying degrees of seriousness. 215 personal aggressions frustrated or whose consequences are not recorded. 69 private and political centers destroyed, 312 buildings assaulted. 113 general strikes, 228 partial strikes. 10 newspapers totally destroyed, all right-wing. 83 assaults on newspapers, attempted assaults and destruction. 146 bombs and explosive devices. 38 picked up unexploded.

On July 12, Lieutenant Castillo, a member of the Republican Antifascist Military Union who had been involved in the repression of a right-wing demonstration, was assassinated. The following day, a group of assault guards (the security force to which Castillo belonged) wanted to avenge him by killing Gil-Robles, but when he was not at his home they decided to attack José Calvo Sotelo, former minister of finance of the monarchy and head of the Bloque Nacional (a grouping of monarchists and Carlists, of a traditionalist or ultraconservative nature), who, despite his scant political weight, acted in parliament as one of the most visible leaders of the opposition. His assassination was considered as a justification (he was called the protomartyr of the Crusade) for the military uprising that took place four days later, although not as its trigger, since the fact that it had been in preparation for several months had become an open secret before which all the social and political forces were taking a position.

=== Spanish Civil War ===
The two Spains as defined by the war front in 1936

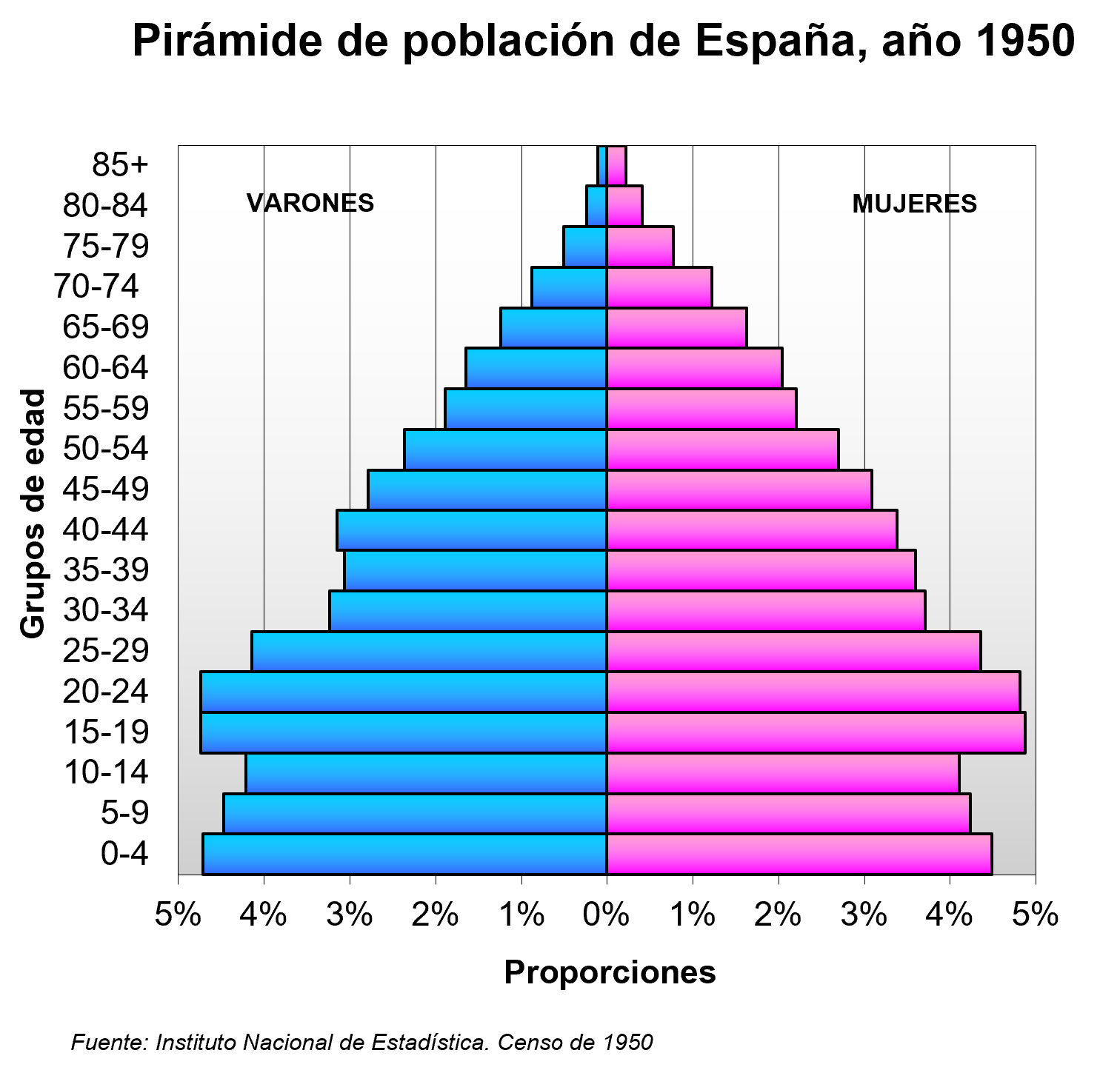
The symmetrical notch (which affects both sexes equally) is clearly observed in those born between 1936 and 1939, who in the year 1950 were already between 14 and 11 years old; and the asymmetrical notch (which only affects males) in the age groups between 30 and 40 years old, who in the War were between 14 and 11 years younger, that is, they were of military age

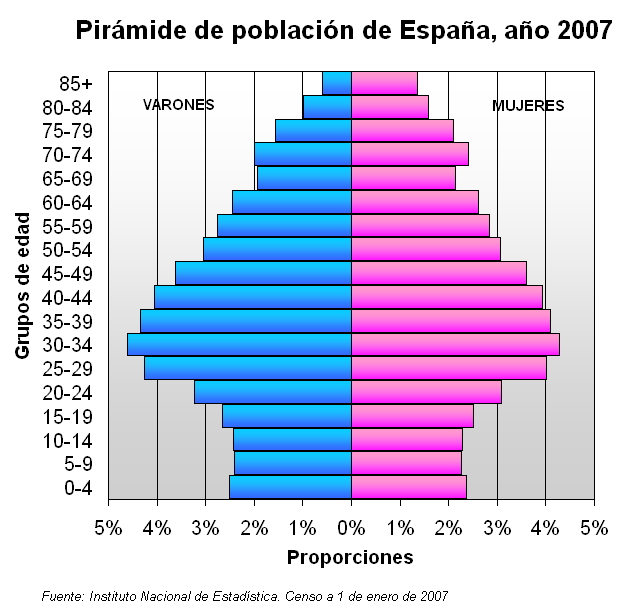
The symmetrical notch of the Civil War baby boomers is still observed in the 69-65 age group. The male overmortality of those over 85 explains the disproportion between males and females, but it is only partly due to the war dead.

On the afternoon of July 17, the military uprising began in Morocco and on the morning of July 18 in most of peninsular Spain. The so-called National Uprising failed in key places, such as Madrid and Barcelona, due in some cases to the opposition of part of the army, and in others to the popular resistance, organized in militias of trade unions and leftist parties that obtained arms from the government authorities (throughout the war the military activity of leaders of popular extraction was significant, such as Enrique Líster and Valentín González El Campesino —communists, Fifth Regiment—, and Buenaventura Durruti —anarchist, Confederal Militia—). Some points where the uprising triumphed were surrounded as enclaves (Seville, Toledo, Granada). Spain was divided into two zones (national or fascist zone and republican or red zone —depending on who named it—) which determined the condition of nationals or geographical republicans (that is, not by conviction, but by obligation) of a good part of the military, police, civil guards or civil servants; as well as of the forced recruits and civil society. In general terms, the national zone corresponded to the agrarian zones of the north where small property dominated (Galicia, Northern Plateau, Navarre), while the republican zone corresponded to the industrial and working class zones (Asturias, Basque Country, Catalonia, Madrid, Valencia) and the large landowner agrarian zones of the south (Extremadura, Southern Plateau and Andalusia); which also responded broadly to the direction of the vote maintained since the beginning of the century in the successive elections between the left and the right. The other ideological traits that also functioned as identifiers were those that separated the supporters of the more traditionalist concept of the unity of Spain from the peripheral nationalists and those that separated the supporters of the traditional role of the Catholic Church from the anticlericals. The heterogeneity of the sides included the Basque nationalists (Catholics) on the Republican side, and the Catalanists of the Liga (rightists) on the rebel side. The radicalization of the positions implied the marginalization of the moderates of each side or those who did not feel identified with either side (the so-called third Spain).

A very violent repression began in both sides, more systematic on the rebel side, more uncontrolled on the Republican side, which even led to serious internal clashes (the events of Barcelona in May 1937, between anarchists, Trotskyists and communists, involved in a conflict of priorities between winning the war or making the revolution —the so-called Spanish social revolution, which carried out collectivizations and libertarian experiments in areas lacking government control and lost in a short time—. The parades and the extrications of prisoners (clandestine executions) and the regular or irregular arrests (in prisons organized as the national zone advanced and chekas of different orientations in the republican rearguard) were focused on class and ideological enemies: landowners and priests for the republican side, trade unionists and teachers for the national side.

The initial strategic disadvantage of the military rebels (forces concentrated in Africa without the control of the navy and aviation, mostly republican) was compensated with the support of equipment provided by Nazi Germany, which together with Fascist Italy became a decisive ally of the rebels.

The government of the Republic, first presided over by José Giral and then by Francisco Largo Caballero, was unable to obtain similar help from the European democracies, which promoted a policy of non-intervention, while at the same time attempting, through the policy of appeasement, to stop Hitler's expansionism in Central Europe, an ultimately futile effort, demonstrating, among other things, that the Spanish War was the rehearsal and first battle of the Second World War. The only international support the Republic obtained was that of the Soviet Union, which took the form of war material, military advisors and the organization of an international recruitment of volunteers in the International Brigades. The growing Soviet influence was paralleled by an increase in the social and institutional presence of the previously small Communist Party of Spain, especially with the government of the socialist Juan Negrín (from May 1937). The economic payment was complicated by the obscure matter of the withdrawal of the gold reserves of the Bank of Spain to be kept in Russia, the so-called Moscow gold.

From October 1, 1936, the rebel side was placed under the sole command of General Franco, whose prestige had been increased by the hard campaign that connected the southern and northern zones (capture of Badajoz, August 14, 1936), prolonged with the episode of the rescue of the besieged in the Alcazar of Toledo (September 27, 1936). No military could dispute it (the organizer of the uprising, General Mola, and the most prestigious of the rebels, General Sanjurjo, died in airplane crashes). There were no serious internal political disputes either: the founder of Falange Española, José Antonio Primo de Rivera, was a prisoner in the Alicante jail (he was shot on November 20), and from then on he was named as the absent one. With an aesthetic and program inspired by Italian fascism, it was the most extremist party of the right wing and the most prestigious, due to its resolute option for violence, among those who had lost all confidence in the republican system since the right wing lost the elections of February 1936, producing a spectacular increase in its militancy (the new shirts against the old shirts). All the other parties and movements adhered to the uprising (the JONS, already integrated in Falange, the right-wing parties already integrated in the CEDA, Tradición y Renovación Española and various right-wing groups, Catholics, Carlists, monarchists, etc.) were dissolved and forced to unify with Falange under the acronym FET y de las JONS (in Spanish: Falange Española Tradicionalista y de las Juntas de Ofensiva Nacional Sindicalista, Decree of Unification of April 19, 1937). It became evident that the war was not being waged to reestablish a liberal-conservative monarchy or a right-wing republican government, but to implant a totalitarian regime similar to the Italian and German ones.

The defense of Madrid, heavily bombed, acquired propagandistic tones (motto No pasarán, poem by Antonio Machado who called Madrid Rompeolas de todas las Españas) amplified by the majority support of intellectuals for the republic (Alianza de Intelectuales Antifascistas, Paris International Exposition of 1937). A determined resistance managed to avoid the capture of the capital, although it had to be dislodged by the government, which took refuge in Valencia. The evacuation of the right-wing prisoners caused one of the most controversial episodes of the war: the murders of Paracuellos. Also controversial were the episodes related to the fall of the Republican northern zone: the bombing of Guernica, the capture of Bilbao (theoretically protected by an iron belt) and the retreat of the Basque nationalists (Santoña Pact).

The Republicans tried to take the initiative with the offensives of Belchite (August–September 1937) and Teruel (December 1937 – February 1938), which were neutralized. More serious consequences had the arrival of Franco's troops in the Mediterranean in Vinaroz (General Yagüe, April 15, 1938, culmination of the offensive of Aragon), which cut the Republican zone in two. The approach of a serious counteroffensive in the Battle of the Ebro (July–November 1938), the most important of the whole war, could not break the front decisively, and the exhaustion of the Republican forces led to the fall of Catalonia (December 1938 – February 1939) and the departure for exile in France of the first large contingent of Spanish Republicans, including the resigned president Azaña (February 27, 1939), who had futilely tried to reconcile the two sides with his emotional speech Peace, Mercy and Forgiveness (July 18, 1938). The last days of the war were not of fighting at the front but in the Republican rear, where the coup d'état of Colonel Casado took place (March 4, 1939) and the rapid dissolution of all authority, while the flight into exile was hastily organized. The capture of Madrid by Franco's troops was carried out without any opposition, and on April 1 the last report of the Spanish Civil War was signed.

The subject of the Civil War is the one with the greatest literary production of all Spanish historiography, as well as the most polemic and generator of social and political debate (see historical memory). Not even on the dates there is total agreement: the so-called revisionists propose the revolution of 1934 as the beginning of the war, while the declaration of the state of war itself was divergent on both sides: the Republican government did not declare the state of war until almost its end (to maintain civil control of all institutions), while Franco's government did not lift the declaration until several years after the end (to ensure its military control).

The consequences of the Civil War have greatly marked the subsequent history of Spain, because of their exceptionally dramatic and long-lasting nature: both demographic, which marked the population pyramid for generations (increased mortality from direct violence —175,000 dead at the front, 60,000 from repression in the national rearguard and 30,000 in the republican rearguard— and from the deterioration of living conditions and food; the destruction of the cities, of the economic structure —50% of the railway structure and more than a third of the merchant navy and livestock—, of the artistic heritage —despite attempts to protect it, such as the one that led to the evacuation to Switzerland of the main collections of the Museo del Prado to avoid the bombing of Madrid, but that were unfeasible to generalize, given the dispersion of religious art—, the repression in the rearguard of both zones —maintained by the victors with greater or lesser intensity throughout the Franco regime, some 50,000 executions— and the exile of the losers), which were perpetuated well beyond the prolonged postwar period, including the geopolitical exceptionality of maintaining Franco's regime until 1975.

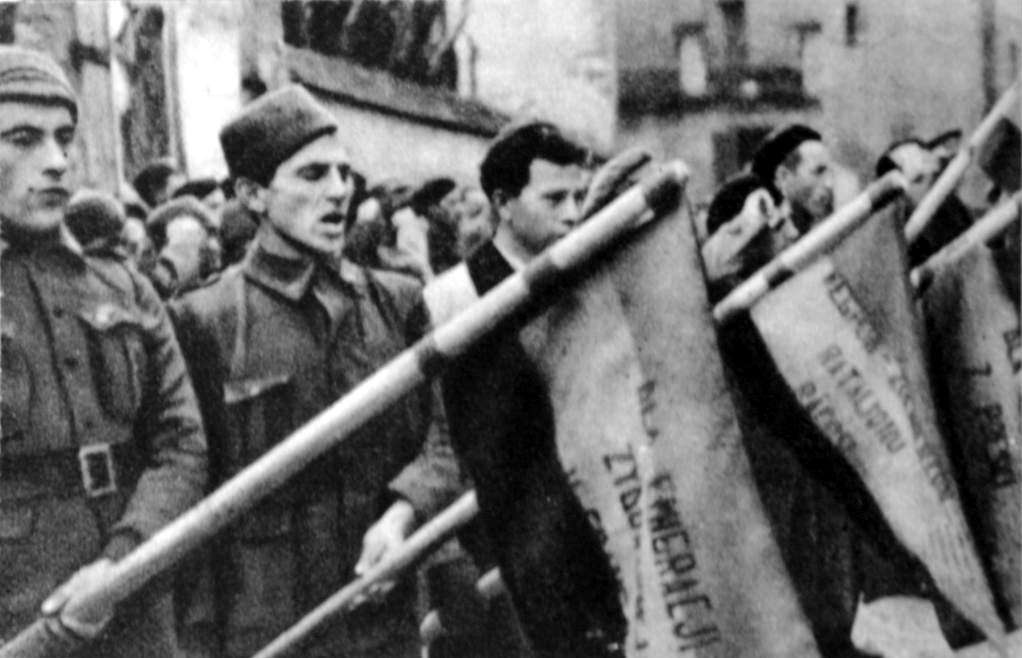
Poles swearing allegiance to the Second Republic.

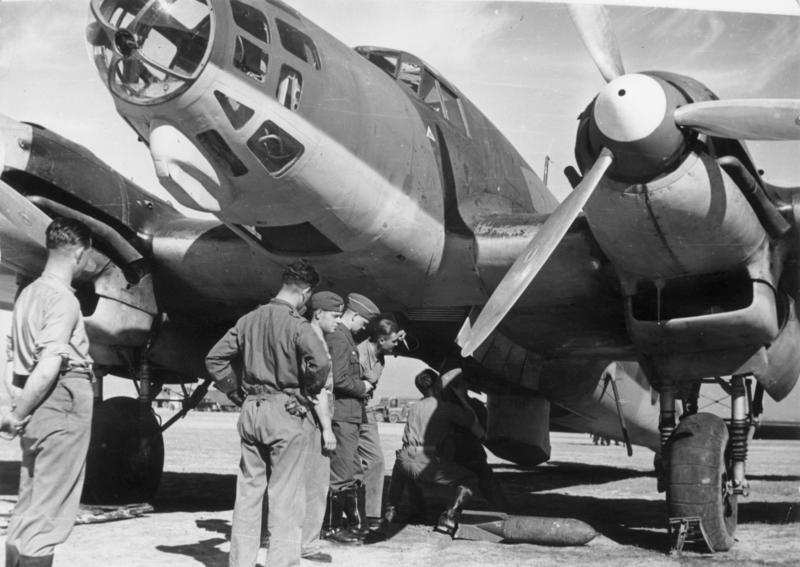
German soldiers loading a Heinkel He 111 of the Condor Legion with bombs

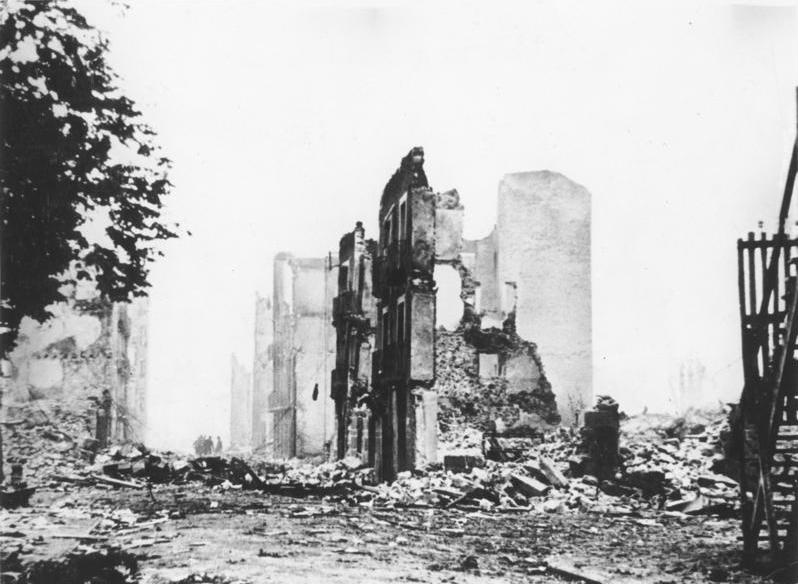
Guernica after the bombing of April 26, 1937

== Franco's dictatorship (1939–1975) ==
=== Autarchy and National Catholicism (1939–1959) ===
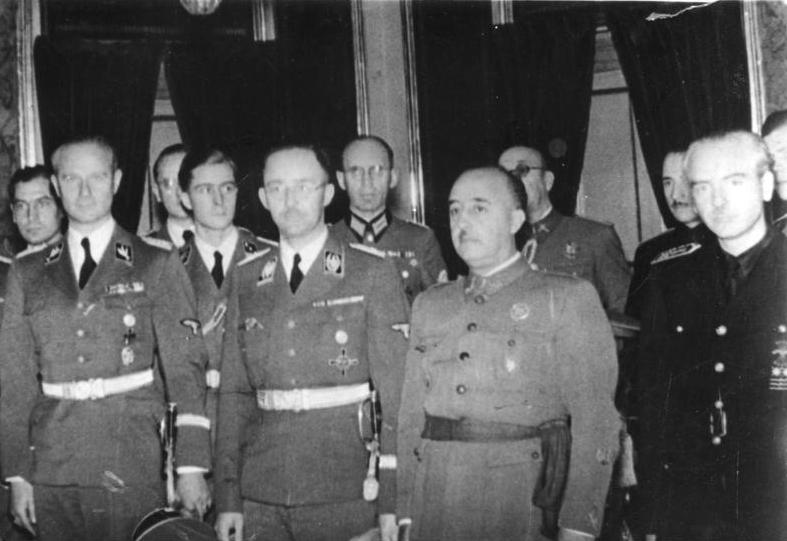
Franco next to Heinrich Himmler, head of the SS in 1940. On the right is Serrano Suñer, called el cuñadísimo because he was Franco's brother-in-law imitating one of the dictator's titles; the Generalissimo. Franco also called himself the Caudillo.

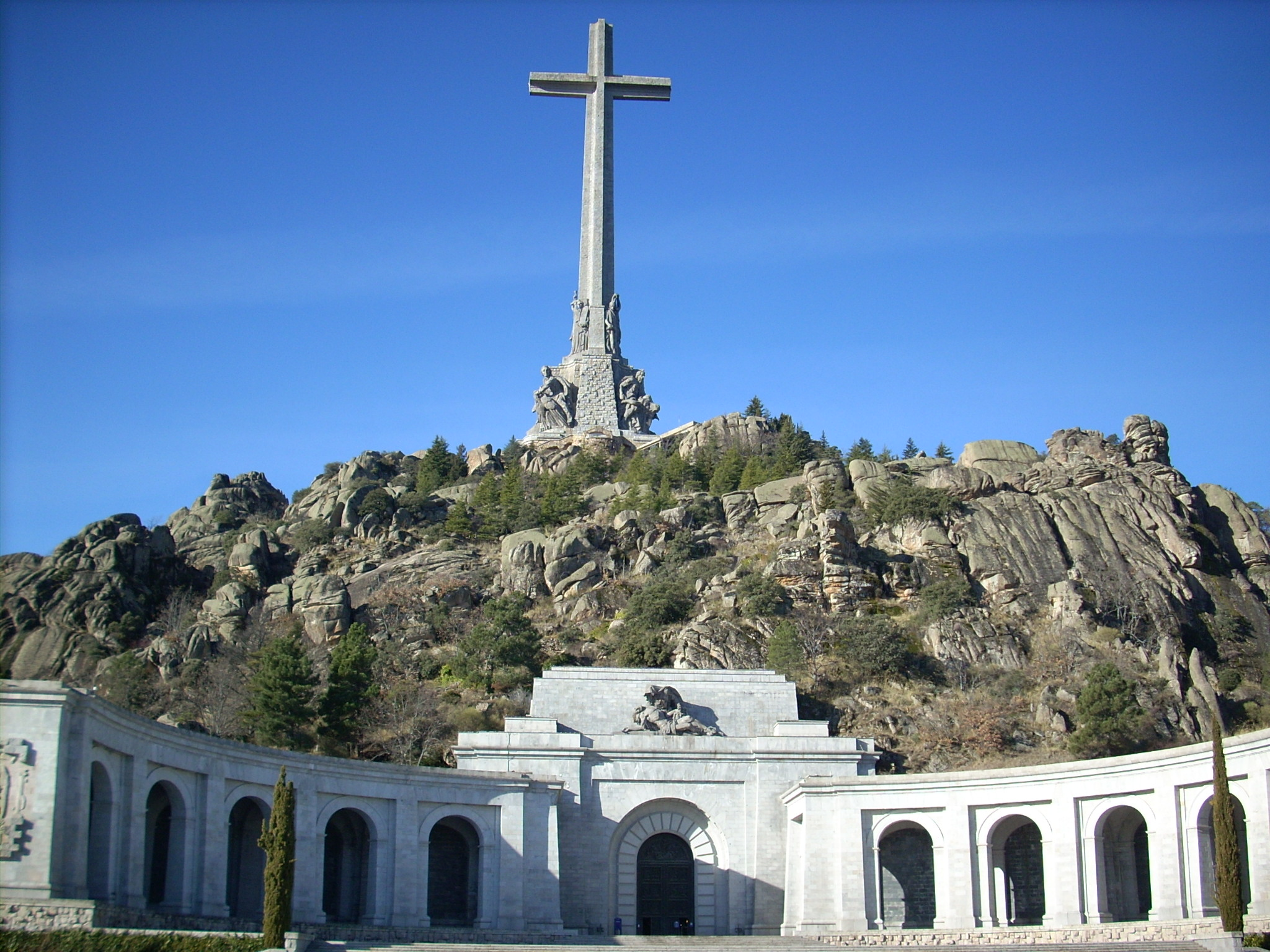
Valley of the Fallen (1940–1958), a Civil War memorial built as forced labor for Republican prisoners. Franco also conceived it to house his own tomb, next to that of José Antonio Primo de Rivera the absent, whose corpse had been carried on the shoulders of Falangists from Alicante to the pantheon of the kings of Spain in the monastery of El Escorial, a place very close to the one chosen for the Valley.

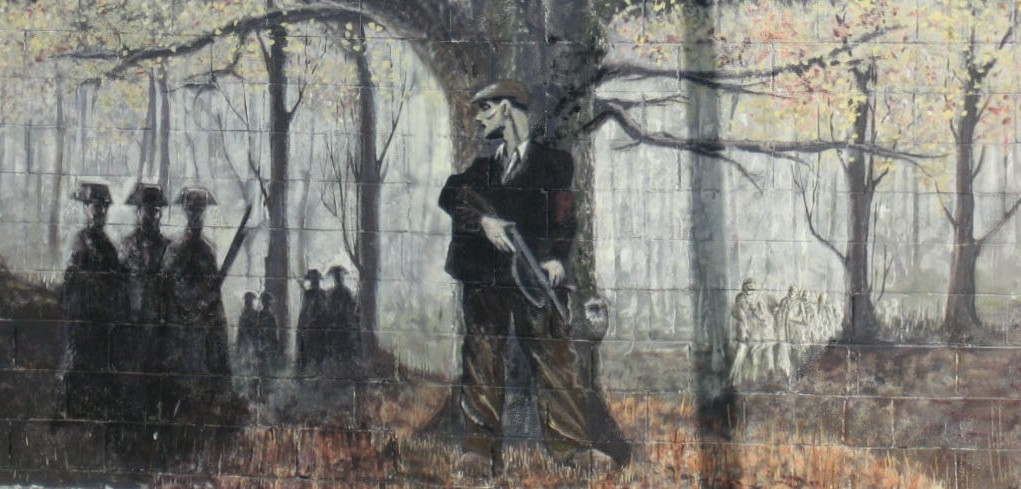
Clash between the Maquis and the Civil Guard in a forest. The anti-Francoist guerrilla activity had its greatest incidence with the end of the Second World War (1945) and lasted until the beginning of the fifties.

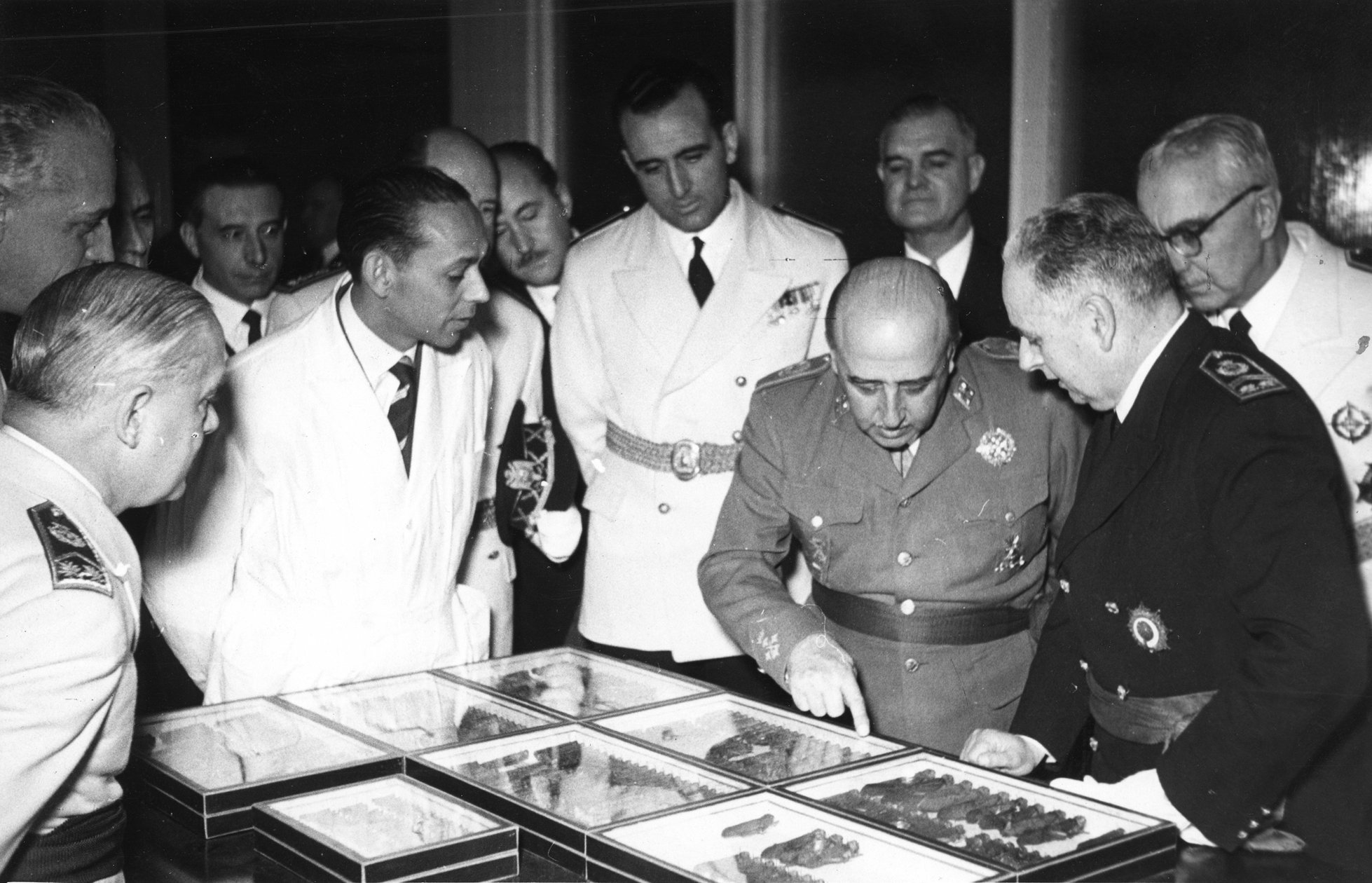
Inauguration of INIA facilities in Puerta de Hierro (Madrid), in 1954. Together with Franco are Eugenio Morales Agacino and Joaquín Ruiz-Giménez.

After the Victory, an extraordinarily harsh repression spread over time (the State of War was not lifted until 1948) and was focused on the social groups identified as Anti-Spain: trade unions and Republican, leftist and peripheral nationalist parties, whose assets were confiscated. A Law for the Repression of Freemasonry and Communism was enacted (March 1, 1940) and a General Cause on the red domination in Spain was initiated (from April 26, 1940, and prolonged until 1969, when the statute of limitations was established for "crimes committed prior to April 1, 1939"). The judicial cases were established for the crime of military rebellion, since although the rebellion had in fact been that of the winning side, it was considered that after the declaration of the state of war, any activity contrary to it, even that of the Republican government, was illegal. Particular attention was paid to Freemasonry (the special object of a personal obsession of Franco's —the Judeo-Masonic conspiracy—) and a thorough purge of the Magisterium was carried out, to prevent the continuity of a body identified with republican values; as well as of all public officials, who were required to swear an oath of adherence to the principles of the National Movement. Most of the intellectuals, artists, writers, scientists and university professors, whose identification with the losing side was in the majority, went into exile abroad or began a painful existence of marginalization and silence (the so-called internal exile: Vicente Aleixandre, Blas de Otero, Antonio Buero Vallejo, generation of 1950). In spite of the production of writers and artists sympathetic to the Franco regime (Azorín, José María Pemán, Ernesto Giménez Caballero, Luis Rosales, Camilo José Cela, Pedro Laín Entralgo), the return of some celebrities of great international importance (notably Ortega y Gasset and Dalí) and the maintenance of a minimum of scientific activity (creation of the CSIC), the period has come to be called the destruction of science in Spain; or, in the expression of Luis Martín Santos, Time of Silence (Tiempo de silencio).

The events of 1956 demonstrated that, despite the success of Francoism in maintaining and achieving social conformity (legitimacy of exercise, as argued by its defenders), by conviction or repression, among the popular and middle classes, it failed precisely among the elites, producing an evident alienation of a significant part of the intellectuals initially related, and especially of the university youth, highlighting the joint protagonism in the riots of both children of the victors and children of the vanquished.

The unification of political parties and social movements in favor of the uprising continued after the war, although within the Movimiento Nacional the different sensibilities and interests of each of the Francoist families were visible, among which Franco, in a paternalistic manner, administered the distribution of plots of power and influence (blue —falangists—, requetés —traditionalists or Carlists—, juanistas —monarchists, supporters of Juan de Borbón, heir of Alfonso XIII, who remained in exile and made alternative approaches to Franco and the opposition—, Catholics —Catholic Action, the National Catholic Association of Propagandists and other institutions, among which Opus Dei gradually gained influence— and military —especially the Africanists, the most trusted by Franco, with relevant commanders in the Civil War and in many cases in the later Russian campaign of the Blue Division—). Each of them publicly expressed slight nuances through a plurality of press media, all of them enthusiastically supportive of the regime and subject to a rigid prior censorship (Arriba, ABC, Ya), which in the case of the audiovisual media was subjected to a total unification in the informative messages (part of Radio Nacional de España, of obligatory diffusion in all the radio stations, and No-Do in all the cinematographic screenings).

The outbreak of World War II forced Franco to maintain a delicate balance between his main supporters (the Rome-Berlin Axis and the Anti-Komintern Pact, to which Spain had adhered), and the convenience of not making enemies with England and the United States. Non-belligerence or benevolent neutrality was declared, which even allowed the sending of military units (theoretically formed by volunteers) to the Russian campaign integrated in the German army (the Blue Division). The leading role in the cordial relations with Germany in the early forties, when the German advance seemed unstoppable, corresponded to Ramón Serrano Súñer. Hitler even proposed to Franco the entry of Spain into the war, but the negotiations, in which the Spanish position was disproportionately demanding, did not come to fruition (Meeting at Hendaye, October 23, 1940).

The change of the war situation in the last years of the war caused a cooling of the declarations of Spanish-German friendship, the withdrawal of the Blue Division and the evident marginalization of the Falangists (Serrano Súñer was discreetly removed and the activity of the blue family was restricted to social affairs; the few movements of discontent —hedillists, already distanced from the leadership since 1937, or authentic Falangists— were effectively repressed or redirected). The discreet rapprochement with the Western allies, however, did not prevent Franco's regime from suffering a harsh international isolation after the end of the war. In any case, what was achieved was the regime's own survival, in the face of the demands of the Soviet Union and the Republican exiles (many of whose members had fought alongside the Allies in the war) that it should share the fate of the other fascist regimes in Europe. In the context of the Yalta and Potsdam conferences, the geostrategic calculations of Churchill and Truman considered it preferable to keep Franco in Spain (as well as Oliveira Salazar in Portugal, who was decidedly Anglophile), rather than risk an increase of Soviet influence in Western Europe just when a new alignment of blocs on both sides of the Iron Curtain was taking place at the beginning of the period known as the Cold War.

An irregular warfare campaign (the maquis) was initiated by small Republican units infiltrated into Spain following the tactics used during their participation in the French Resistance. Although it did not have any military success (the invasion of the Aran Valley in 1944 was easily repulsed), it did succeed in provoking a strong repressive reaction which prevented any opposition activity in the interior. It also contributed to increasing the discrepancies that made the Second Spanish Republic in exile inoperative, with less and less support among foreign governments. The evidence of the impossibility of defeating Franco militarily led to Stalin's decision that the Communist Party of Spain opted to try to obtain social presence in the underground, even infiltrating the very institutions of Franco's trade unionism; after Stalin's death, Santiago Carrillo insisted on this path through the political orientation called national reconciliation (1956).

The totalitarianism of the regime was expressed in a body of legislation initially inspired by Italian fascism (Fuero del Trabajo, an imitation of the Carta del Lavoro), but which was adapted to the successive political situations as Franco's undisputed internal authority decided that some updating was necessary, in what were called Fundamental Laws. The State had no division of powers (all were concentrated in the leadership, granted to Franco for life), but an attempt was made to give it a bicameral institutional appearance (Spanish Parliament and National Council of the Movement, installed in the palaces traditionally occupied by Congress and Senate), the monarchy was defined as the theoretical form of government (reserving to Franco the election of a "successor as king" from among any member of any historical dynastic branch) and the term organic democracy was coined as a political expression (which recognized as the only vehicles of popular participation "the family, the municipality and the trade union").

Corporatism and the negation of any class struggle expressing discrepancy of interests between employers and workers led to the formation of a vertical union in which both were represented organically and under rigid political control, which established prices and wages in a highly intervened market. Autarky was not only a necessity brought about by the World War and subsequent isolation, but was argued to be a conscious political choice based on nationalist pride and economic protectionism.

The economic difficulties of the Spanish post-war period lasted for about twenty years to recover pre-war production levels. Faced with hunger, malnutrition and the use of harmful foods (lathyrism), it was necessary to maintain Auxilio Social institutions and the rationing of basic necessities, in parallel with the operation of a black market (popularly known as "estraperlo"), which was very lucrative for those who ran it, in collusion with the corruption of some of the regime's leaders. The emigration from the countryside to the city was stopped, demanding internal passports and residence permits, and in fact the occupation statistics by sectors reflect the ruralization produced in the 1940s, which was not reversed until the following decade. A business system was established, presided over by large public monopolies (Tabacalera, Campsa, Renfe, Telefónica) together with a newly created public business conglomerate (the INI) made up of companies in sectors considered strategic (Astilleros Españoles, iron and steel —Ensidesa—, mining —Hunosa—, industrial vehicles —Enasa—), sharing their managers with the select nucleus of the large oligopolistic companies of traditional Spanish capitalism, especially the banks and electricity companies. Public works policies were initiated, focused on the construction of reservoirs and other agricultural improvements such as the expansion of irrigation systems, land consolidation and the so-called colonization (Instituto Nacional de Colonización, Badajoz Plan), as alternatives to the Republican agrarian reform.

National Catholicism became the dominant ideology, with an overwhelming presence of the Catholic Church in all public and private spheres. Rigid moral requirements of behavior were established to suppress the libertinism associated with republican secularism; with great insistence on sexual morality, submission to the father of the family, subordination of the feminine condition and religious education for children and young people. The ecclesiastical hierarchy, decimated by republican repression, had declared the character of the Civil War as a liberation crusade and the providential nature of the figure of Caudillo Franco, to whom the right of presentation of bishops was recognized. He was even received in the temples under a canopy and his name and title were incorporated to the rogation of the liturgy of the Mass. The main international support of the regime was the Holy See, with whom the Concordat of 1953 was signed, recognizing the Church as a perfect society, whose interests were totally identified with those of a fully Confessional state. The Eucharistic congress of Barcelona in 1952 was the only relevant international event held in Spain at the time.

International isolation did not allow Spain to benefit from the Marshall Plan, but the rapprochement with the United States brought about the signing of the Madrid Agreements (September 26, 1953), whereby U.S. military bases were established in Spain and credits and economic and military aid were received. U.S. support allowed Spain's entry into the UN in December 1955.

=== Development and opening (1959–1975) ===
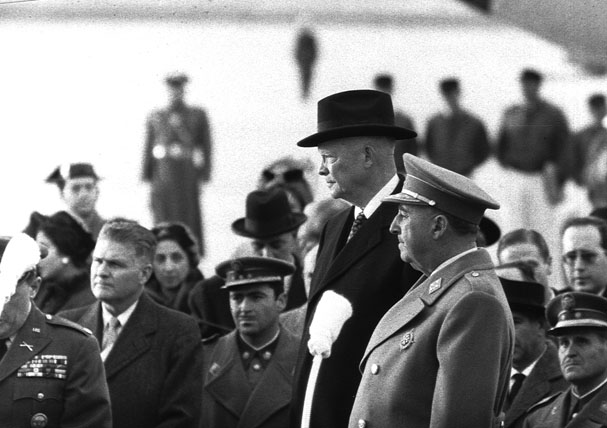
Franco and U.S. president Dwight D. Eisenhower in Madrid in 1959.

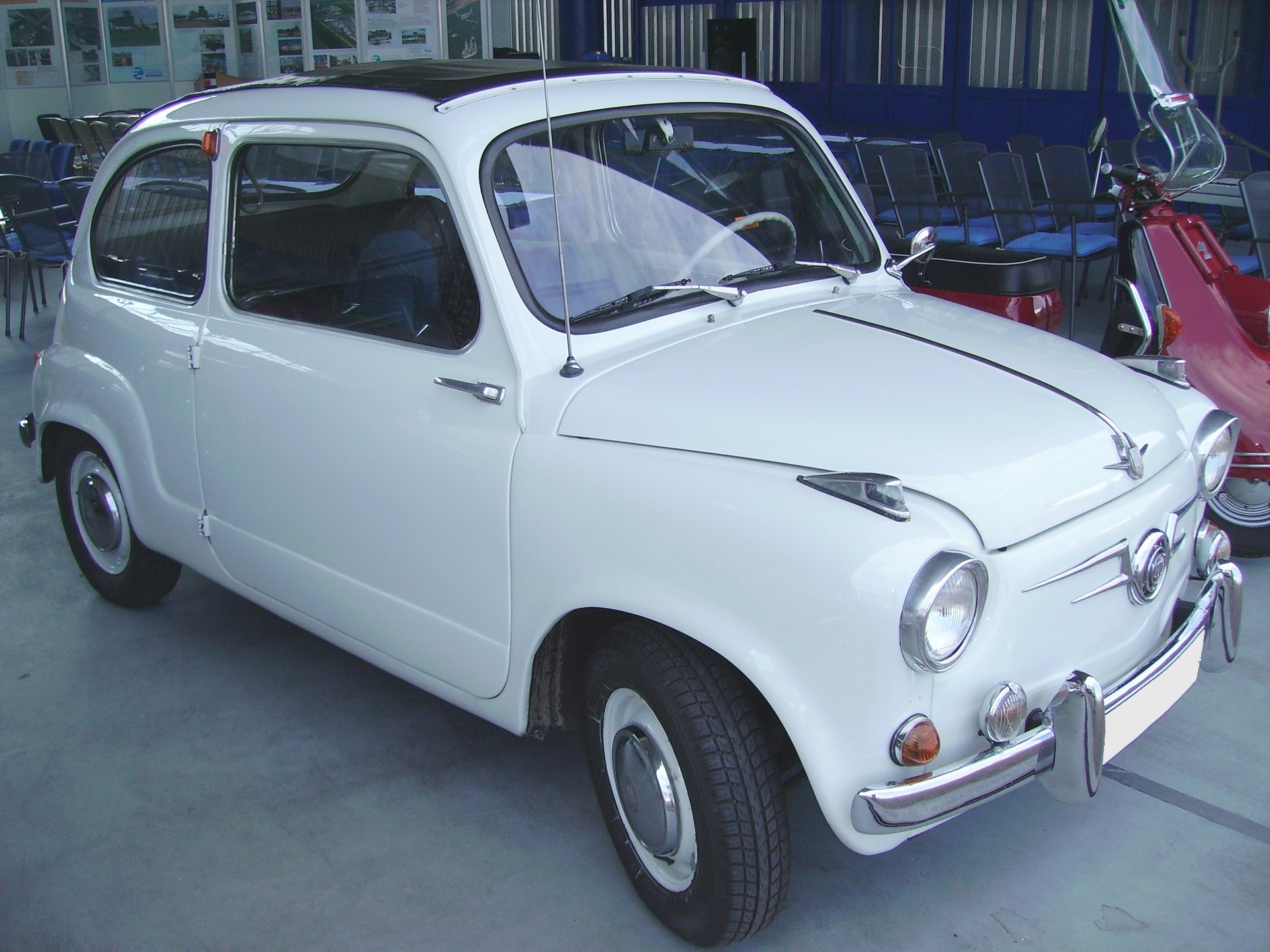
SEAT 600, symbol of economic development.

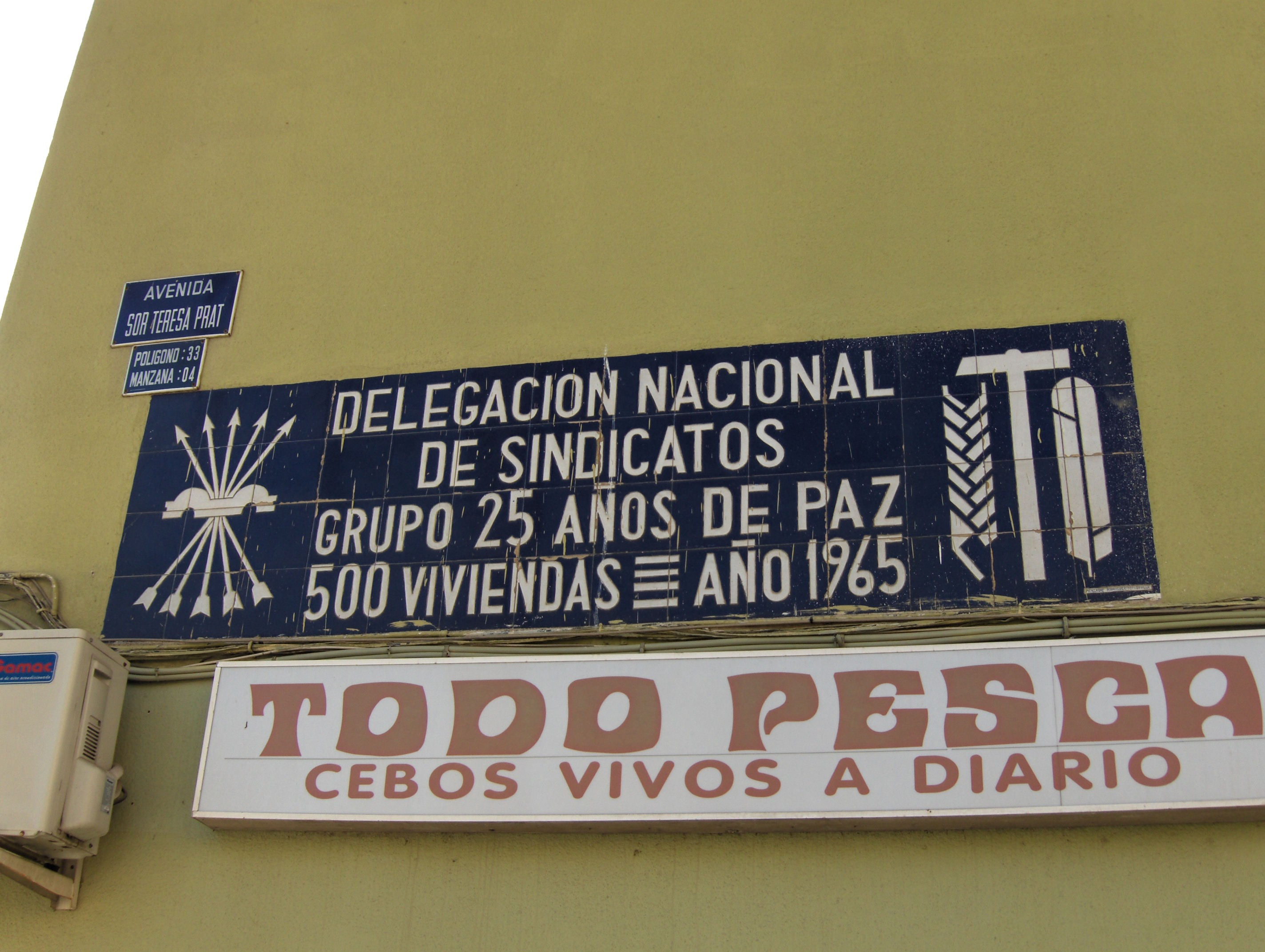
The symbolism of the vertical union and the denomination XXV Years of Peace were used for a group of houses in Malaga (1965)

After the establishment of the alliance with the United States, the regime allowed a relative political opening, consisting of the damping of the fascist rhetoric of Falange or the enactment of laws (such as the Press and Printing Law of 1966 or Ley Fraga, by Manuel Fraga Iribarne, the most open-minded minister) that suppressed prior censorship, although it did not mean a real freedom of expression.

The economic liberalization was more profound, opening the economy to foreign investment and to private initiative, although the institutional edifice of the INI and the public monopolies was maintained. The necessary previous step was the Stabilization Plan of 1959, followed by the subsequent Development plans; a whole design planned and managed by a group of economists linked to Opus Dei who were called technocrats (Alberto Ullastres, Mariano Navarro Rubio, Laureano López Rodó, Gregorio López-Bravo) with the support of credits from the International Monetary Fund, the OECD and the U.S. government. At the end of the period, the modernization demands of the international institutions made it necessary to propose an educational reform (General Education Law of 1970) that would introduce functionalist criteria and renovation techniques in a system already far removed from the national-Catholic school of the first Franco regime.

The internal opposition among the families of Francoism manifested itself in scandals such as the Matesa case (1969), which was resolved expeditiously by Franco, who dismissed both the ministers involved (from Opus) and his adversaries (among them Fraga himself, who was accused of using the press to denounce the case). Fraga had also been the driving force behind international tourism (Spain is different campaign, network of Paradores Nacionales), which was becoming an important engine of the economy. Income from tourism together with remittances from Spanish emigrants abroad compensated for the structural deficit in the balance of payments of an expanding international trade.

The rural exodus and emigration to Europe (which replaced the traditional American destination of Spanish emigration) alleviated social tensions at a high human and cultural cost: uprooting; but it brought as a consequence the definitive overcoming of the pre-industrial society by an industrial and urban society, which in time meant the destruction of the very social and ideological bases of Francoism. The increase of the urban population was spectacular in the periphery of the industrial cities and dormitory towns of the metropolitan areas of Madrid, Barcelona or Bilbao, creating problems of supplies and public services, overcrowding and shantytowns. The economic sectors experienced accelerated industrialization and tertiarization, with a notable contribution from the construction sector, both housing and public works. Social and geographic inequalities, however, allowed social stability to prevail, imposed by the dominant values of an expanding middle class whose priority was material well-being rather than ideological issues (in terms that became popularized with the denominations of sociological Francoism and silent majority).

The commemoration of the XXV Years of Peace (1964) was intended to demonstrate that Francoism had achieved a broad social consensus and sufficient flexibility to allow the institutionalization of the future of the regime. After adding the Organic Law of the State to the increasingly complex legislative edifice, Juan Carlos de Borbón y Borbón, grandson of Alfonso XIII and son of the pretender Juan de Borbón, was named successor to Franco as king, in compliance with the Fundamental Laws of the Realm (July 1969). The latter, despite being at odds with Franco since the 1940s and remaining in exile in Portugal, had allowed his son to be educated in Spain under the control of the authorities; although he maintained his ascendancy over the so-called monarchist family around the ABC newspaper, which produced some internal conflicts in the Franco regime.

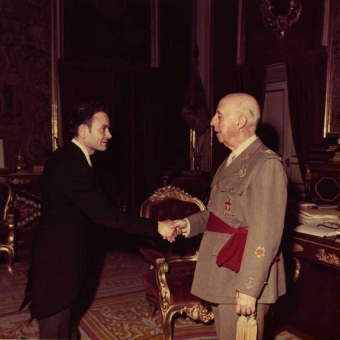
Franco (right) at a reception in 1972. His advanced age raised doubts about the continuity of the regime after his death.

The opposition to Francoism, very atomized and among which the organizational capacity of the Communist Party of Spain stood out, began to move with increasing boldness, even using the mechanisms of labor representation of the Francoist vertical union through the Comisiones Obreras (Workers' Commissions). There was an important meeting of personalities from the Republican exile with important figures from the interior who were repressed on their return, which the Spanish press baptized with the pejorative name of the Munich Contubernium (June 1962). The formation of opposition coordinating bodies continued in the 1970s (Democratic Platform, in which the PCE did not participate, and the Democratic Junta, promoted by the PCE).

After the Second Vatican Council the distancing between the Catholic Church and the regime became evident, personalized in figures such as Father Llanos, who shared the working class life in the suburbs of Madrid, and bishops such as Vicente Enrique y Tarancon and Antonio Añoveros Ataún (who was the protagonist of a notorious scandal).

In 1968 the problem of separatist violence arose with Euskadi Ta Askatasuna (Euskadi Y Libertad, ETA), a group previously founded as a radical split of Basque nationalism, and which was intended to be dismantled by combining severity and clemency with the condoning of the death sentences of the Burgos Trial (December 3, 1970). After reorganizing, their most spectacular attack was the assassination of Luis Carrero Blanco (December 20, 1973), a few months after he was named president of the government (in June). Carrero Blanco, a man trusted by Franco since the beginning of the regime, had been the first to be appointed to that position during the Franco regime, since until then his functions were included in the competencies reserved for himself by the head of state.

After an ambiguous speech by Franco (in which he even pronounced the enigmatic phrase no evil for good), Carlos Arias Navarro was appointed President of the Government. The worsening of Franco's state of health forced Prince Juan Carlos to take over as head of state on an interim basis for a few months, after which the general returned to exercise power on his own, making his last public appearance, in the Plaza de Oriente, to reject the international condemnation of some death sentences (October 1, 1975). Finally, in the last months of the year, Franco's illness entered its final course, at a critical moment of the Western Sahara conflict: the Green March, which Juan Carlos had to manage by authorizing the negotiation of the abandonment of the African province in favor of Morocco and Mauritania (Madrid Agreements of November 14, 1975). After an agony artificially prolonged by his own son-in-law (the Marquess of Villaverde, a doctor with political and scientific ambitions, who had tried to emulate Barnard with a controversial heart transplant), his death was declared on November 20, 1975, the anniversary of the death of José Antonio Primo de Rivera, the founder of the Falange.

=== Art and culture during Franco's dictatorship ===
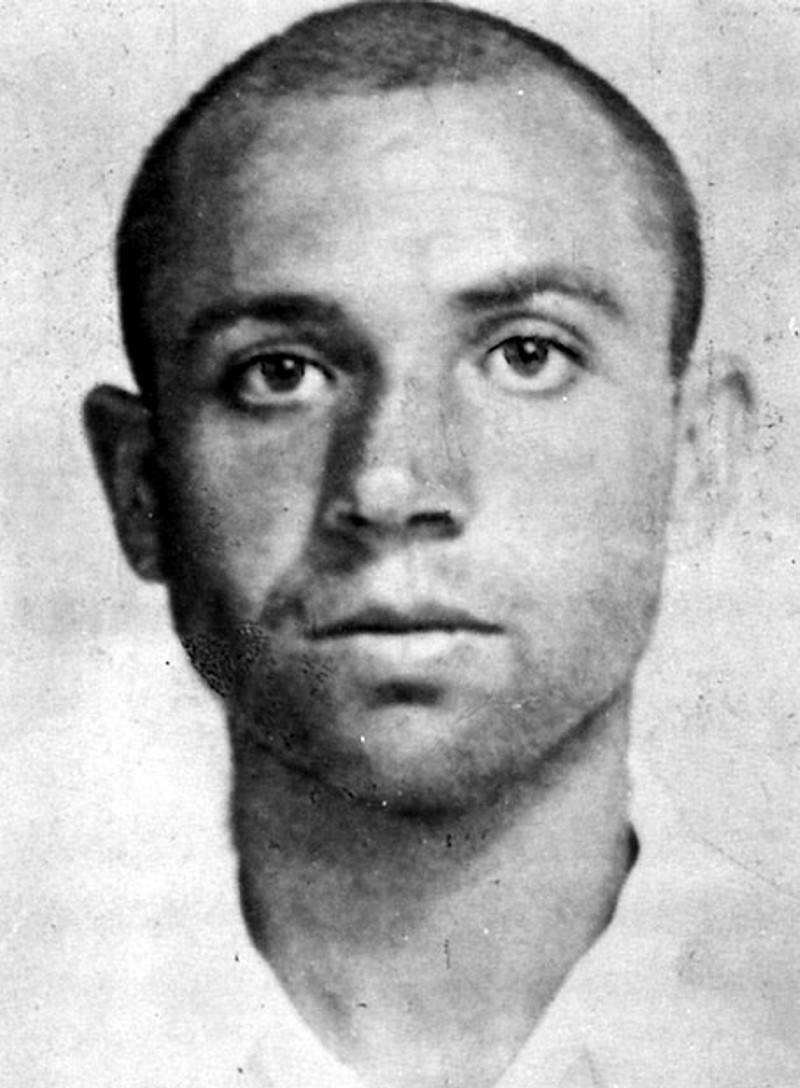
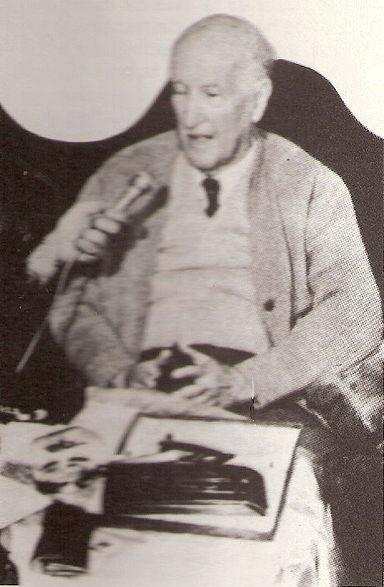
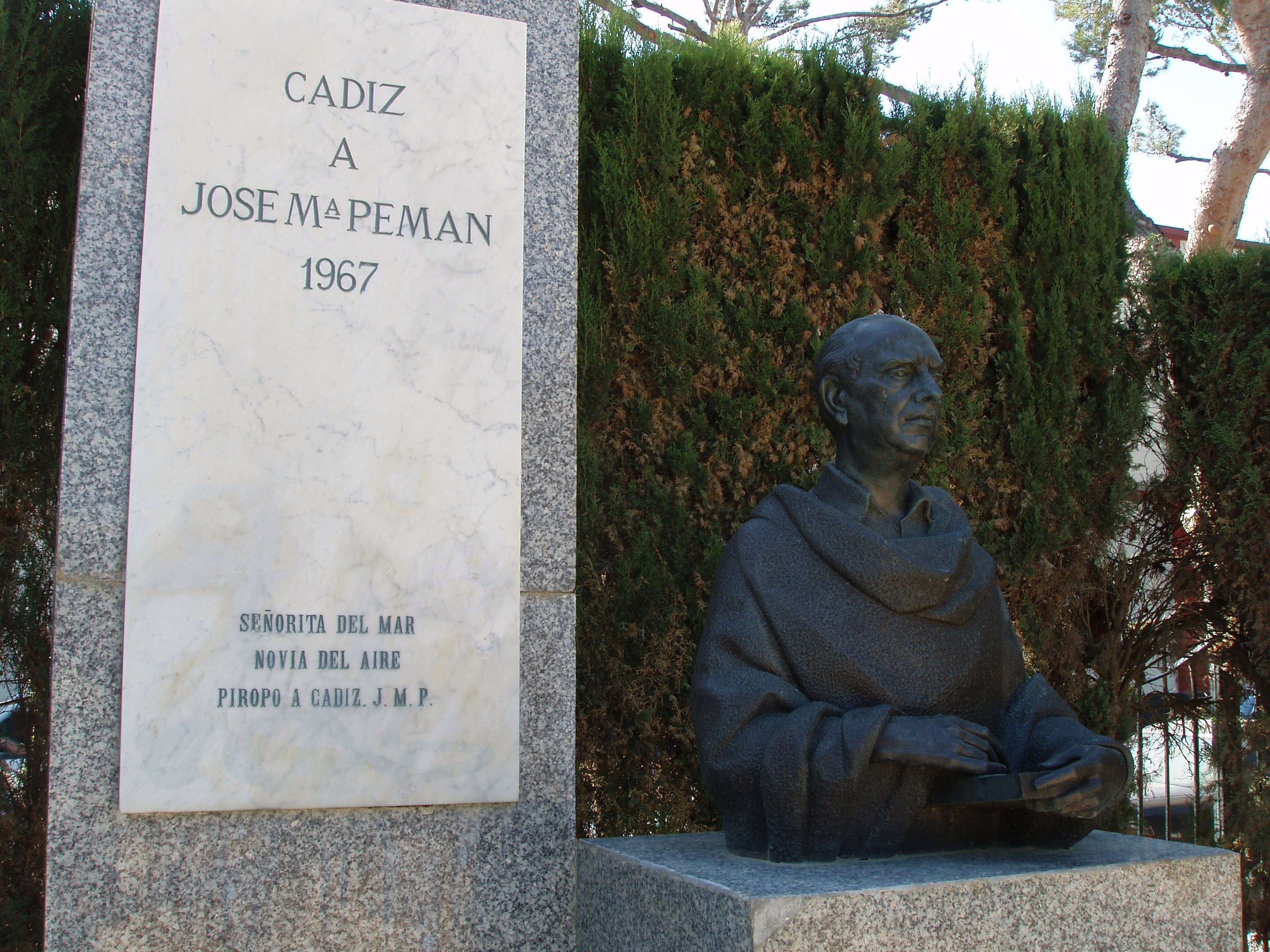
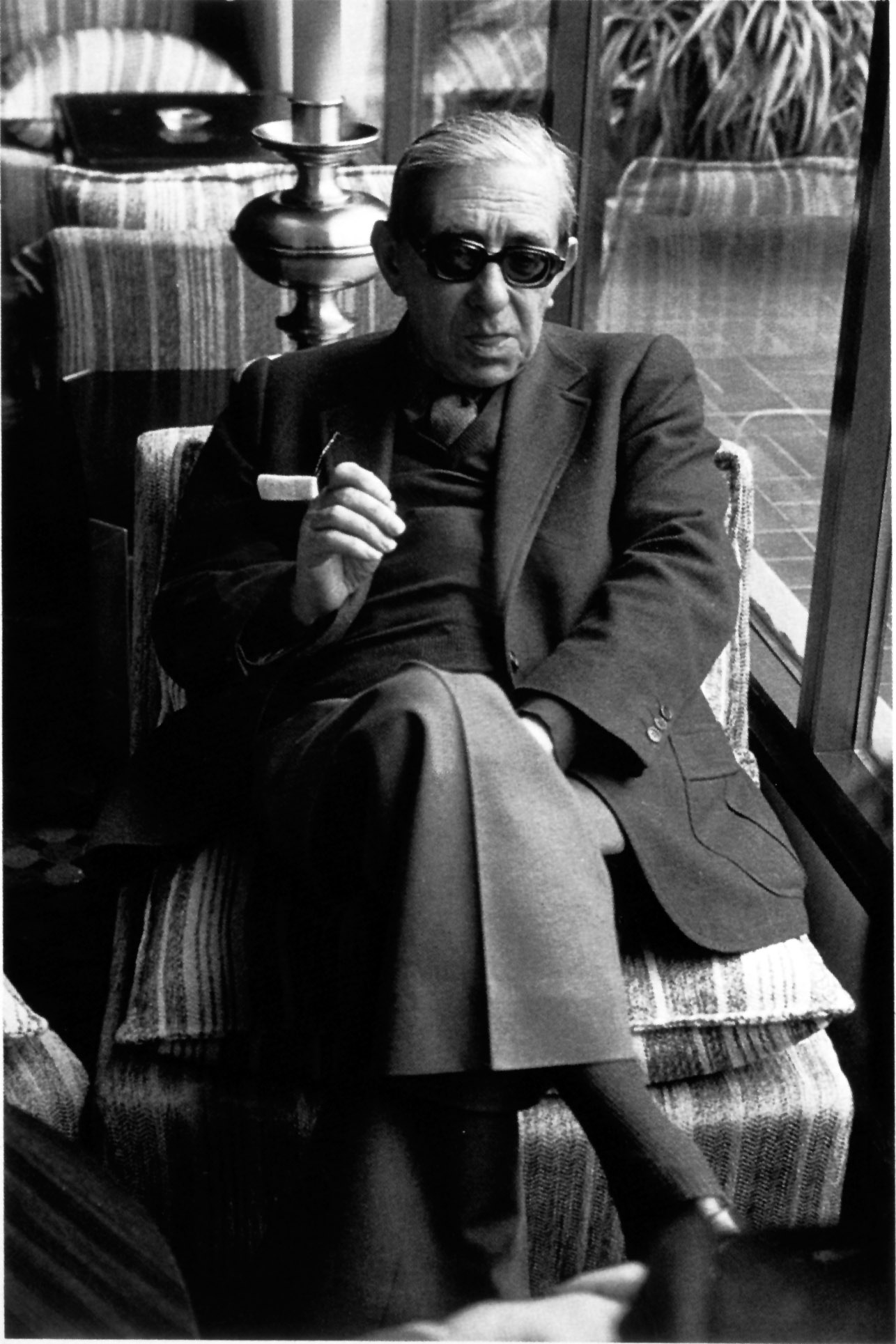
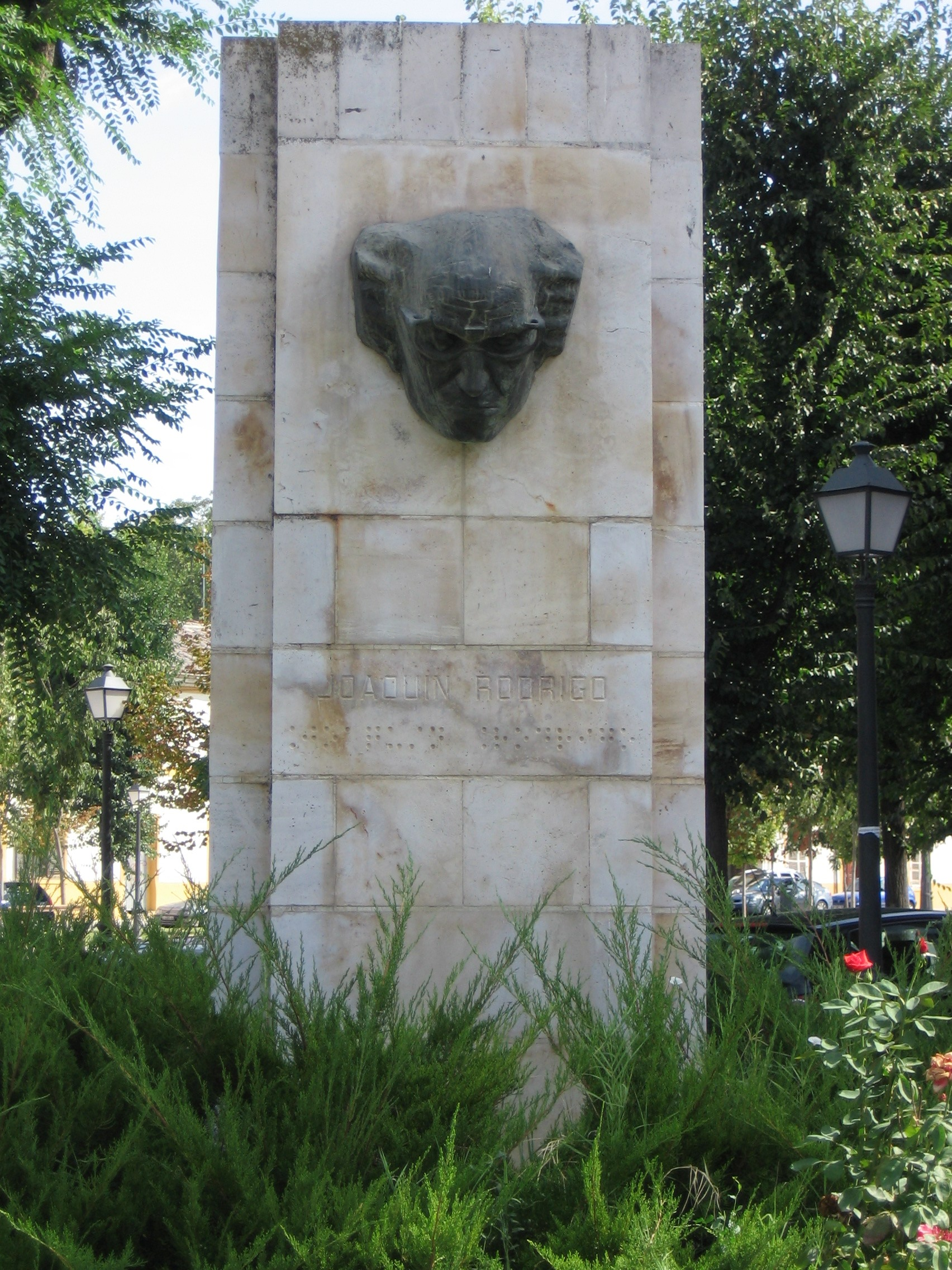
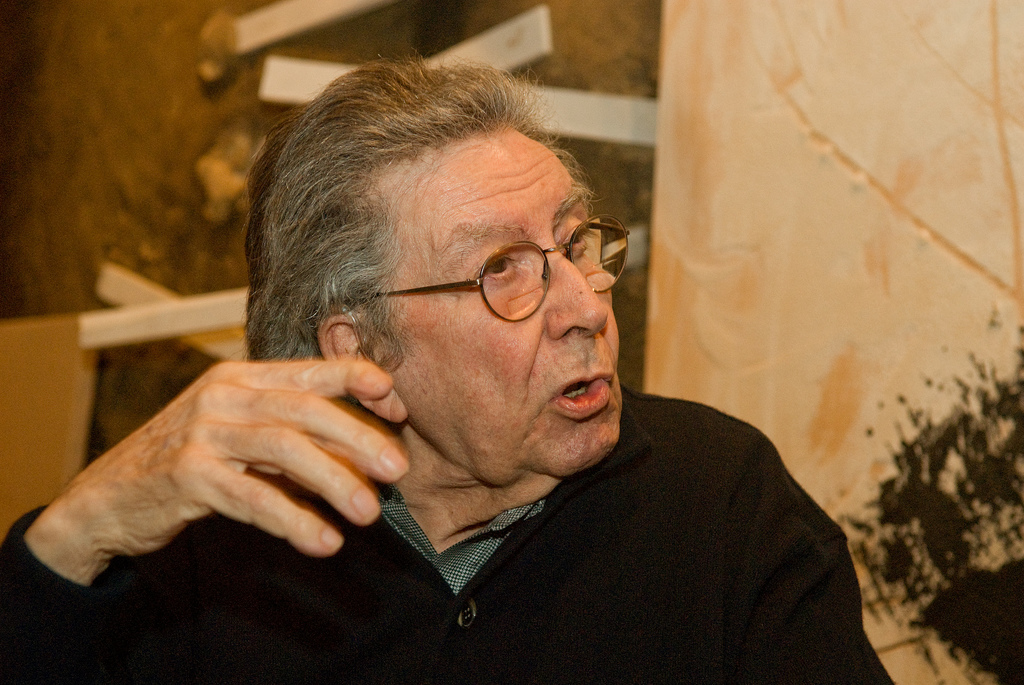
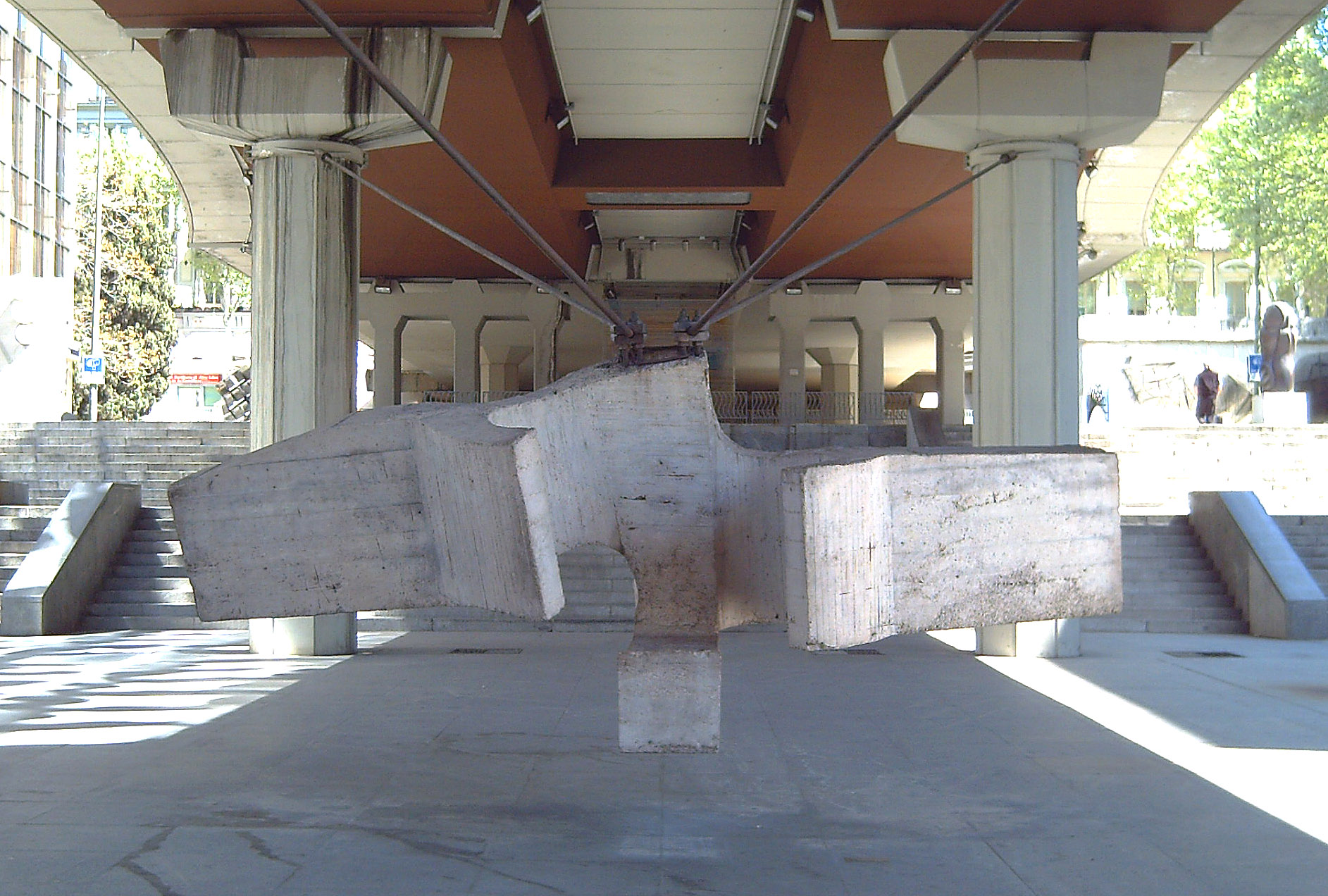
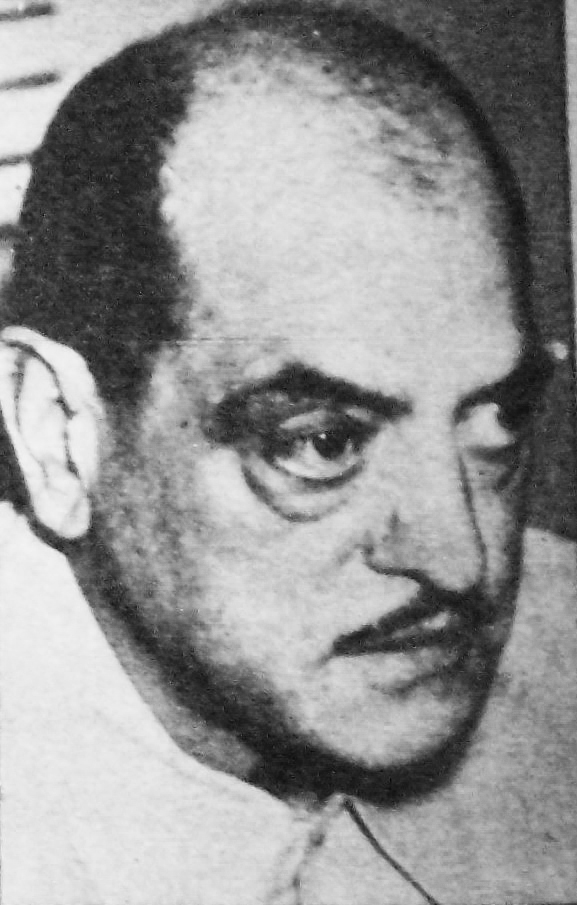
The poet Miguel Hernández, who died in prison in 1942, was portrayed by his fellow captive Antonio Buero Vallejo, who would later achieve great acceptance on the theatrical stage with a bitter vision of the human being and society. Spanish cultural life in the post-war period was tragically overshadowed by the violent deaths of prominent personalities identified with both sides (Federico García Lorca, Ramiro de Maeztu, Pedro Muñoz Seca). Valle Inclán and Unamuno (in January and December 1936, respectively) and Antonio Machado (shortly after crossing the French border in 1939) had died of natural causes.
Vicente Aleixandre, among the poets of 1927, was the one who best represented the vital and intellectual commitment to a fruitful but discreet inner exile, like that of the painter Joan Miró. On the other hand, outstanding representatives of the generation of friendship, such as Dámaso Alonso and Gerardo Diego, became involved in the cultural institutions of Franco's regime; while others, such as Luis Cernuda or Rafael Alberti, went into exile and shared it along with writers (Ramón J. Sender, Claudio Sánchez-Albornoz, Américo Castro, José Bergamín, León Felipe, Francisco Ayala, Arturo Barea), musicians (Manuel de Falla, Pau Casals), plastic artists (Pablo Picasso, Julio González, Alberto Sánchez Pérez, Josep Lluis Sert), scientists and professionals from all disciplines; whose international recognition was very high in universities and all kinds of cultural institutions, culminating in the Nobel Prizes of Juan Ramón Jiménez —Literature, 1956— and Severo Ochoa —Medicine, 1959—. The awarding of the same prize to Aleixandre in 1977 —the year in which prominent surviving exiles returned— was understood as the international validation of the recovery of democracy in Spain.
Monument to José María Pemán (the minstrel of the Crusade). He was also an outstanding monarchist who became president of the private council of Juan de Borbón. Intellectuals close to Francoism (Ernesto Giménez Caballero, Luis Rosales, Agustín de Foxá) or those who for one reason or another tried to get closer (Josep Pla, Azorín, Jacinto Benavente) have suffered a common fate in terms of their subsequent evaluation: "they won the war and lost the history of literature".
Gonzalo Torrente Ballester, like other intellectuals coming from Falangism (Pedro Laín, Dionisio Ridruejo), distanced themselves from the regime. The end of Franco's regime meant the opening of a significant cultural space that was occupied by authors directly hostile to the regime, such as Manuel Vázquez Montalbán and others of the novísimos group. The editorial impact of the Latin American boom had a great influence. Other consecrated figures continued with an active literary production, such as Camilo José Cela or the authors of the 50's generation. The university became one of the bastions of opposition to Francoism, as demonstrated in February 1965 by the scandal of the deprivation of the professorships of Enrique Tierno, José Luis López Aranguren and Agustín García Calvo, with whom Antonio Tovar and José María Valverde expressed their solidarity.
Joaquín Rodrigo (Concierto de Aranjuez, Fantasía para un gentilhombre) was the most important figure in Spanish classical music under Franco, which also had conductors such as Ataúlfo Argenta and performers such as Narciso Yepes and Andrés Segovia. Spanish dance was consolidated with Vicente Escudero (Decálogo del buen bailarín, 1951). Regional folklore was revitalized through the extensive recovery and compilation work of Coros y Danzas (Sección Femenina de Falange); and individual efforts such as that of the Segovian dulzainero Agapito Marazuela. Popular music was dominated by the so-called Spanish song, in which performers such as Imperio Argentina and Concha Piquer gave voice to the work of composers and poets of extraordinary quality, such as Quintero, León and Quiroga.
Antoni Tàpies and other representatives of art that broke with academic conventions (Museo de Arte Abstracto Español, in Cuenca) obtained institutional support and space in the cultural life of Franco's regime
The initial refusal and subsequent municipal rectification to install Eduardo Chillida's The Beached Mermaid in Madrid's Open Air Sculpture Museum was a resounding cultural scandal of the 1970s.
The film director Luis Buñuel, exiled in Mexico and France, was admitted into Spanish cinema in the 1960s, causing a scandal with Viridiana (1961), which Franco himself considered an excess of clerical zeal. The censorship of cinema and other mass media during the Franco regime produced some ridiculous extremes (scandal of Gilda (1946), alteration of the script of Mogambo, 1953). Although it continued until the 1970s, it was greatly mitigated over time, allowing productions of great artistic stature that included a fairly evident critical component, such as those of Carlos Saura, Luis García Berlanga or Juan Antonio Bardem.

== Reign of Juan Carlos I (1975–2014) ==
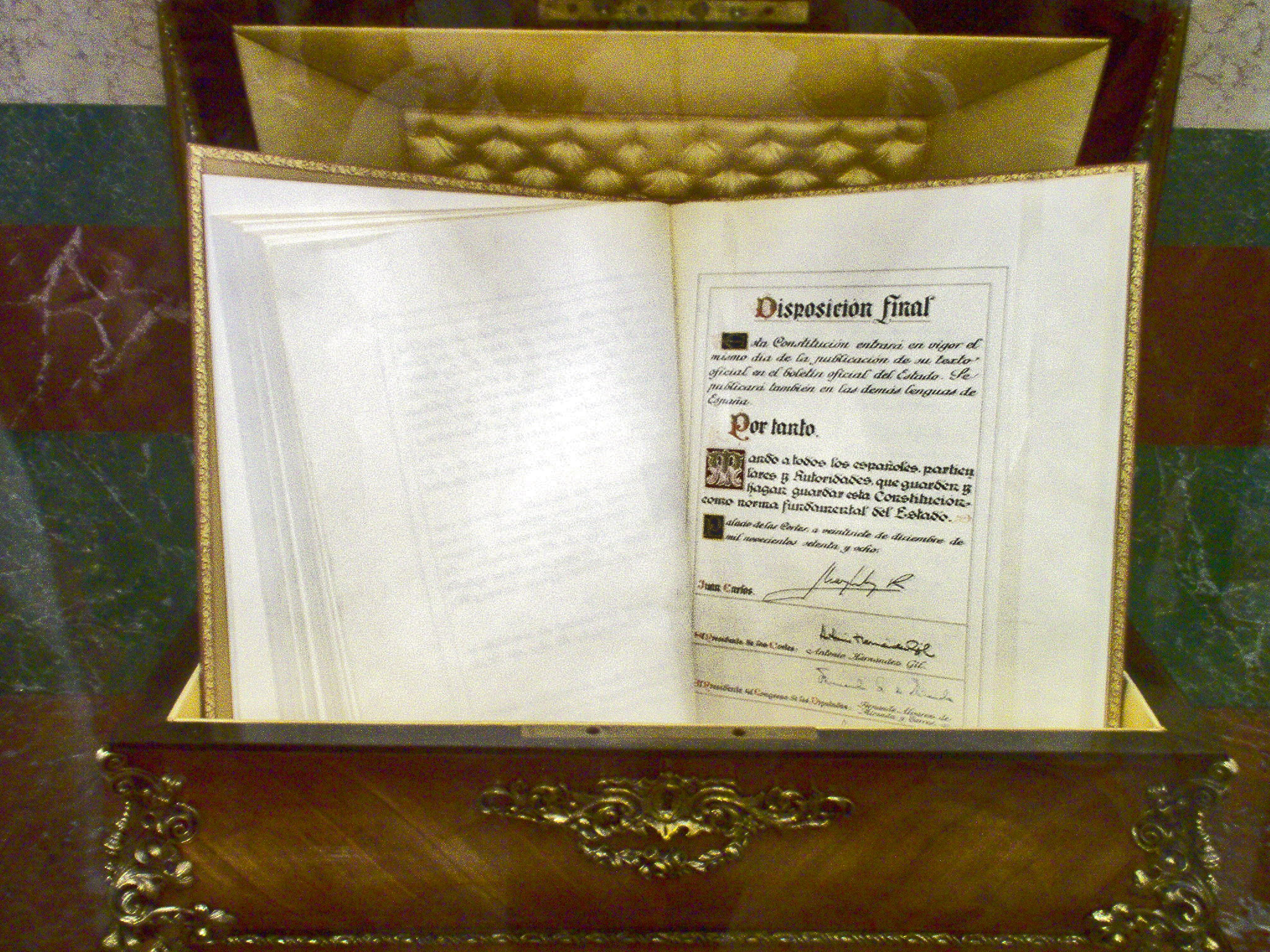
Constitution of 1978

=== Democratic Transition (1975–1982) ===
==== Second government of Carlos Arias Navarro (1975–1976) ====
Carlos Arias Navarro, who had been the last president of Franco's government, was appointed to this post by Juan Carlos I. After an opening speech, known as the spirit of February 12, there was a clear reversal in response to the pressures of the bunker (gironazo). In a few months, the King's loss of confidence in Arias Navarro became clear, until he obtained his resignation. Together with Torcuato Fernández Miranda, the king obtained a proposal from the institutions in charge of presenting the shortlist of candidates for the presidency of the government to introduce the name of Adolfo Suárez, a relatively obscure character coming from the blue family.

==== Governments of Adolfo Suarez (1976–1981) ====
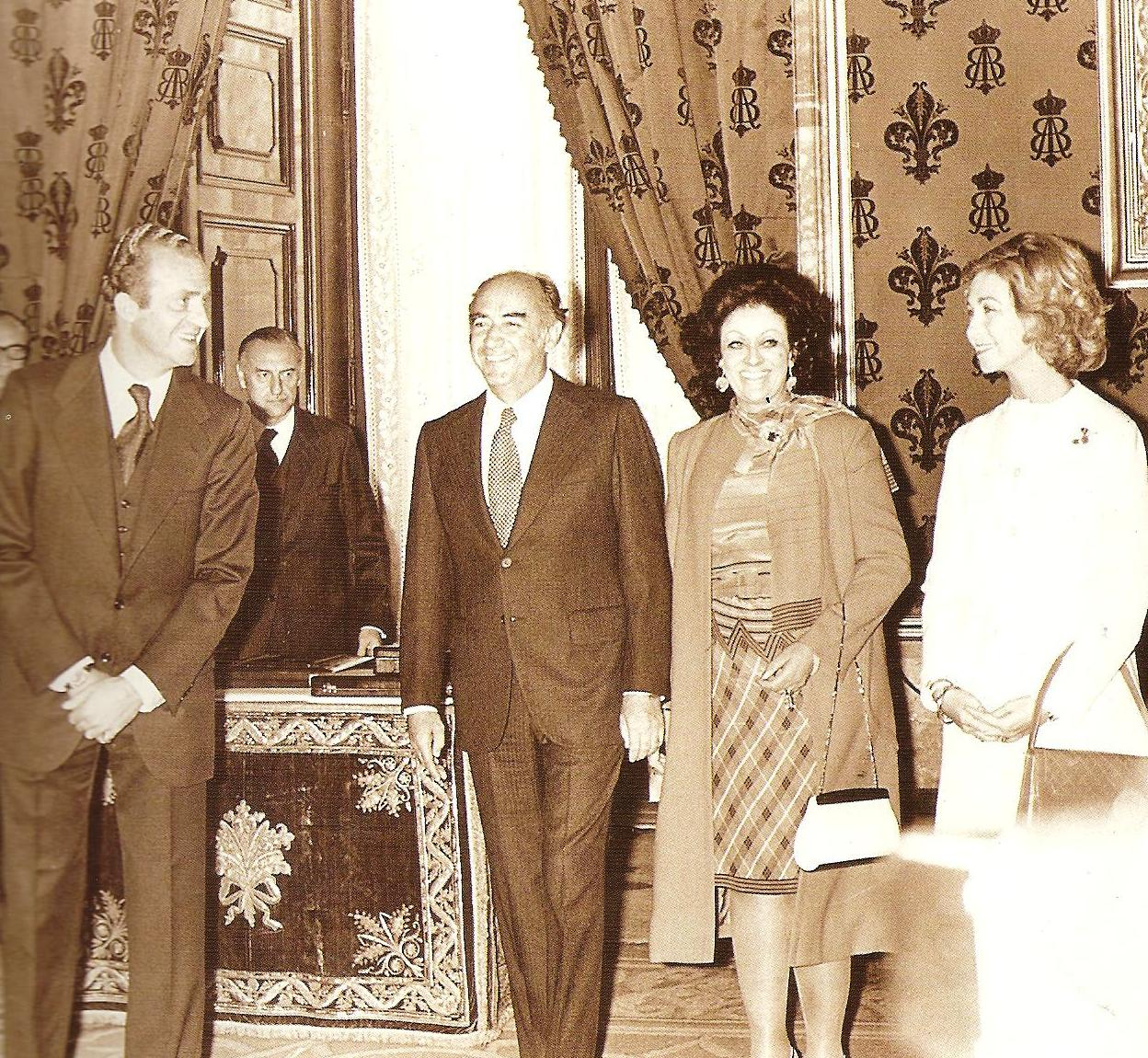
The King and Queen of Spain received the president of Mexico José López Portillo in October 1977, after the resumption of diplomatic relations, interrupted since 1939. Mexico had stood out as a refuge for Spanish Republican exiles.

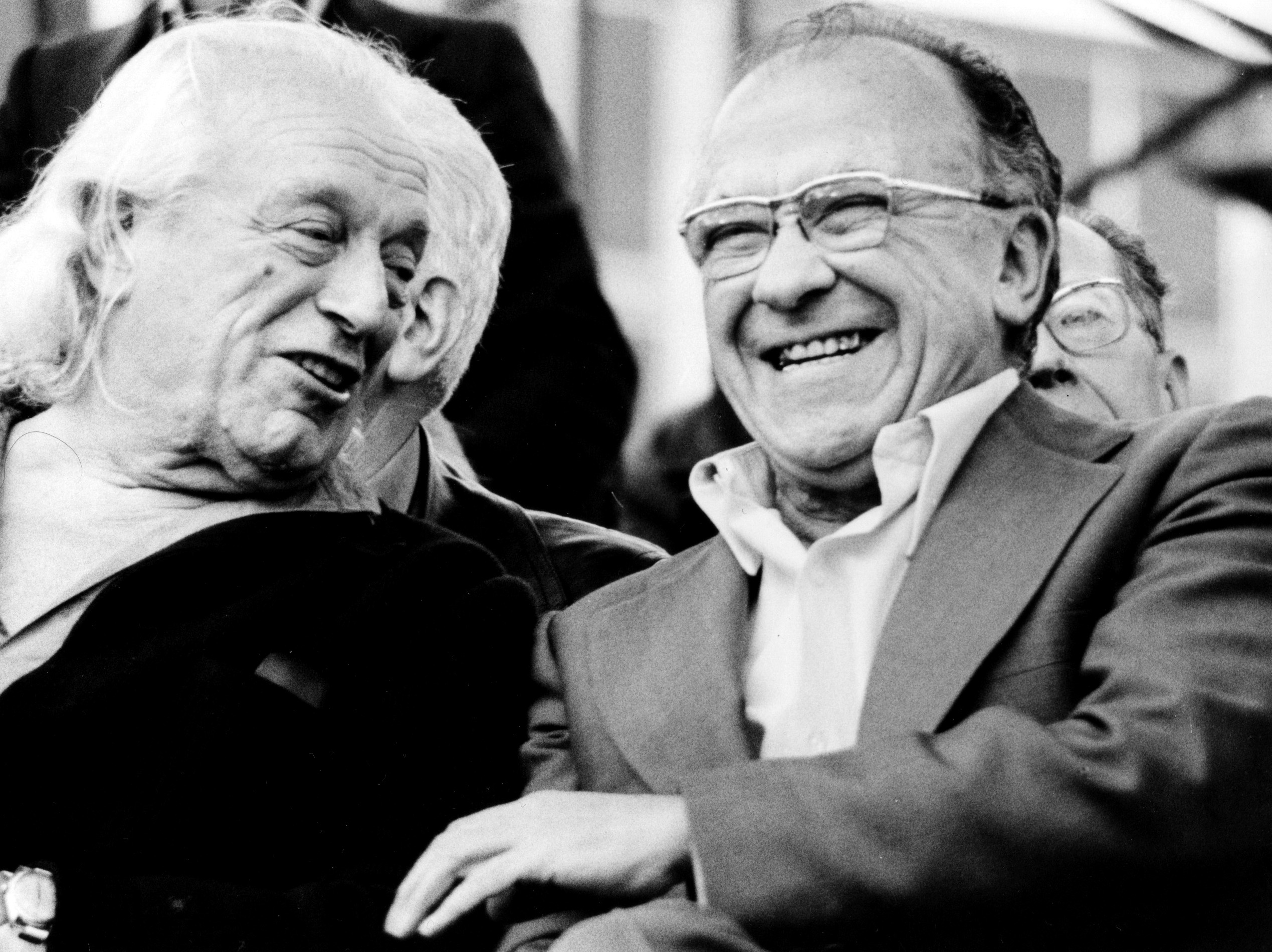
Rafael Alberti and Santiago Carrillo in 1978. The prestigious communist poet occupied, together with La Pasionaria, the mesa de edad of the first democratic courts, in spite of the disappointing results of the PCE.

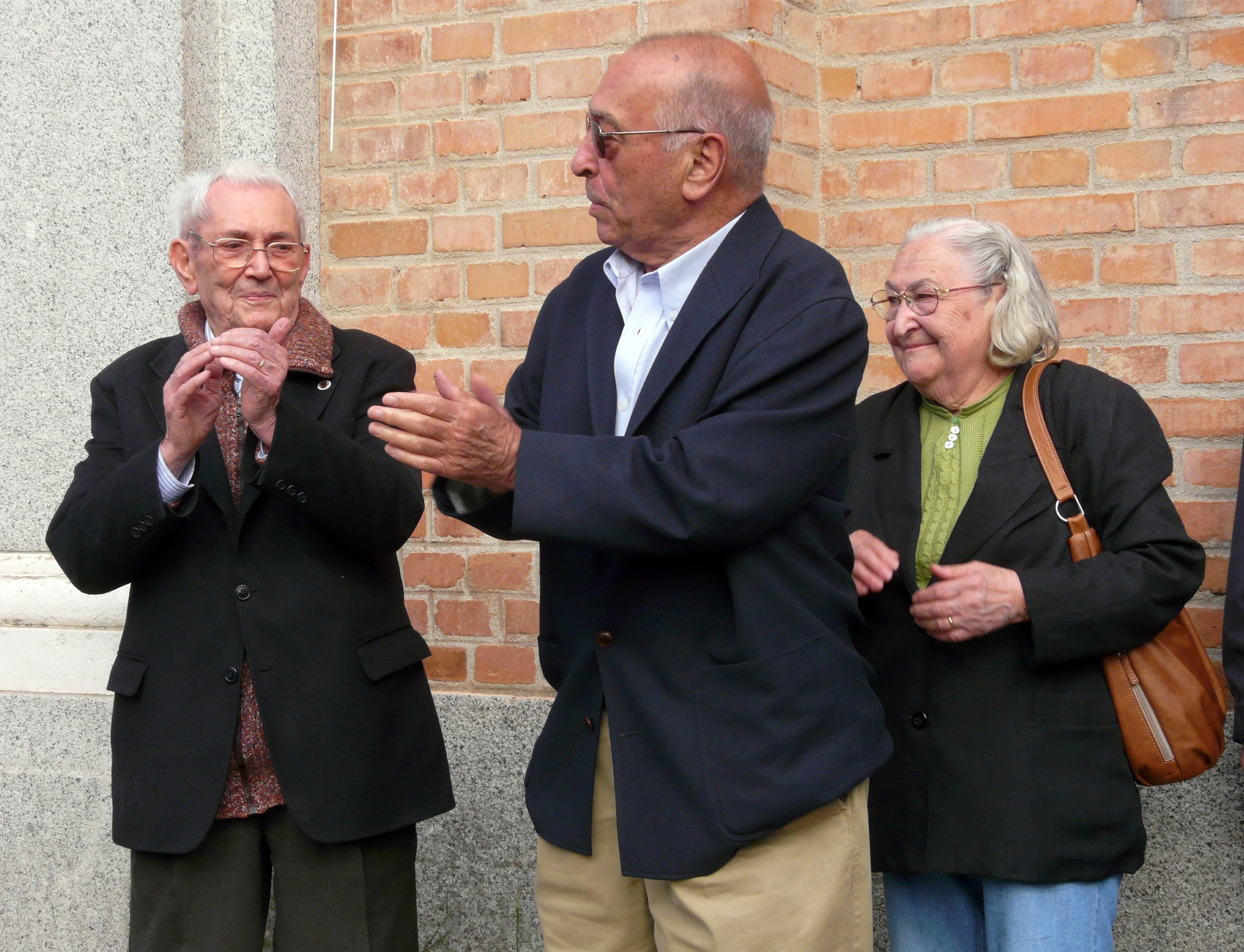
Marcelino Camacho and Nicolás Redondo, union leaders of Comisiones Obreras and UGT and deputies for the PCE and PSOE during the 1970s and 1980s (the photograph is from 2008).

To the surprise of Franco's supporters and opponents, who did not expect such an appointment, he began a rapid dismantling of the Francoist institutional edifice, which involved the so-called harakiri of the Parliament and the calling of a referendum for the approval of the Political Reform Act. The debate between reform and rupture presided over the political movements of groups across the political spectrum, from those in favor of maintaining pure Francoism (the bunker) to those in favor of recovering republican legitimacy without any kind of concessions; however, it was the groups that showed greater flexibility and moderation that proved to have the greatest social support and political capacity.

The problem of terrorism was intensifying; both from the opposition to Francoism (ETA of Marxist–Leninist and Basque nationalist ideology, and the GRAPO of Maoist ideology) and from the far right, whose simultaneous practice seemed to obey the so-called action-repression spiral foreseen by the theory of insurrectionary movements, widely spread at the time, with the aim of provoking political involution, in the form of a military coup d'état. The month of January 1977 was particularly violent, when street altercations between demonstrators and counter-demonstrators (with several deaths) coincided with kidnappings of military personnel and high-ranking officials, assassinations of policemen and labor lawyers (the Atocha massacre). After the mourning manifestation, controlled by the Communist Party of Spain, at the burial of the lawyers, the prestige of Santiago Carrillo as a necessary interlocutor for the government increased. After a few months of clandestine negotiations, during the Easter vacations the PCE was legalized, which was seen as a betrayal by an important part of the army, that in spite of this maintained discipline for the most part (largely as a result of the efforts of Vice-president Manuel Gutiérrez Mellado). As a counterpart demanded by Suarez, Carrillo, in a multitudinous press conference, communicated that his party renounced the republican flag and accepted the parliamentary monarchy and the concept of unity of Spain; it was intended that the military accepted that a party homologated with the communist parties of Western Europe (with whom it had built the concept of Eurocommunism) was not going to get involved in a revolutionary adventure of Leninist character in pursuit of the dictatorship of the proletariat and would not represent a threat to be reacted to violently.

The 1977 General Elections were held, the first democratic elections in forty-two years, and were won by the Unión de Centro Democrático, a party improvised around the figure of Suárez, which enjoyed a comfortable relative majority. Contrary to the most widespread predictions, the main opposition party was not the PCE, but the PSOE, a social democratic party supported by the Socialist International (which later renounced Marxism). The extreme right did not obtain representation, reducing the Francoist camp to the modest result of Manuel Fraga Iribarne's Alianza Popular, considered the most open-minded within the previous regime. The Christian Democrat or Liberal leaders who months before had seemed predestined to occupy the government (José María de Areilza or Joaquín Ruiz-Giménez) had no success, being skillfully overshadowed by Suárez's maneuvers prior to the elections, and who had the support of the team of political confidence formed around the king.

In 1977, the great majority of the parties with parliamentary representation signed the Moncloa Pacts, in which social and economic reforms were agreed upon to combat the crisis, which was seriously affecting employment and inflation, and which established the social market economy model sanctioned by the Constitution. The 1978 Constitution was drafted by consensus and approved that same year in a referendum. Spain defined itself as a social and democratic state governed by the rule of law, with the aim of becoming a Western European welfare state; and it recognized the right to autonomy of its nationalities and regions, a concept of sufficient ambiguity so as not to frustrate the agreement of a very broad political, social and territorial majority. The Spanish transition was proposed internationally as a model to be followed, which implied a broad consensus, the guarantee of public liberties, moderation in social demands, the renunciation of the satisfaction of past grievances and a generous amnesty (which at that time was proposed as a guarantee for the return of exiles, and would later serve to guarantee the non-prosecution of crimes attributable to the repression of Franco's regime).

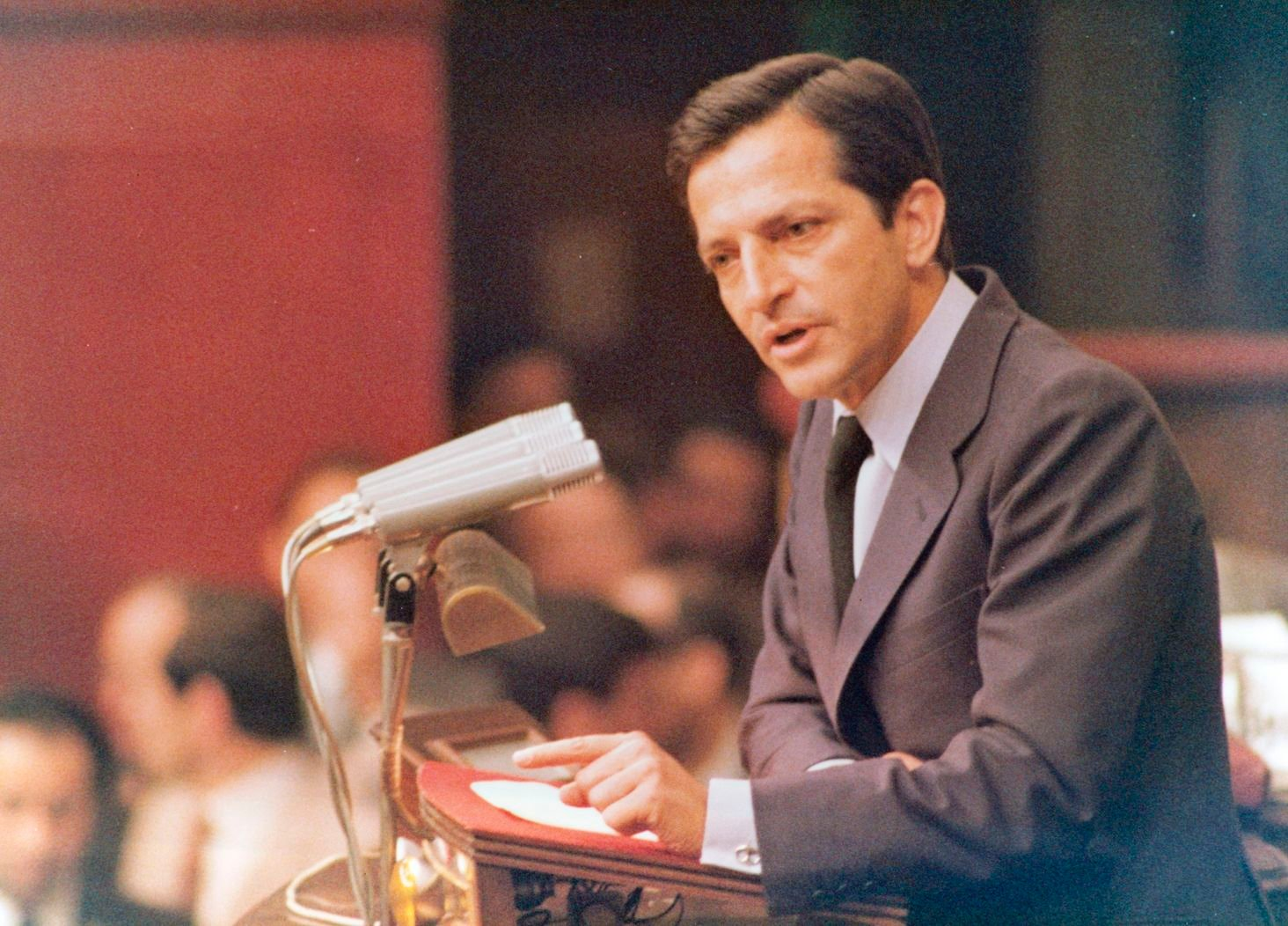
The first president of the Spanish democracy, Adolfo Suárez in the tribune of the Congress of Deputies in 1979.

The 1979 elections increased the number of UCD deputies, without reaching the absolute majority, allowing the confirmation of Adolfo Suárez as president of the government. The normalization of the political system implied continuing with the pre-autonomy process, carried out with the approval of the statutes of autonomy of the regions recognized by the Constitution, for historical reasons (having had autonomy in the Second Republic or having initiated the procedures for it), a privative procedure to reach the maximum competence ceiling: Catalonia and Euskadi (both approved on December 18, 1979), in addition to that foreseen for Galicia, which did so later. In the elections to their autonomous parliaments, the UCD candidacies suffered a significant defeat, to the benefit of the peripheral nationalist parties (Convergència i Unió in those of Catalonia and PNV in those of Euskadi). The Andalusian referendum (February 28, 1980), regardless of its confusing result, implied a defeat for the government and the evidence that it would not be possible to prevent the generalization of the maximum competencies to the communities that so determined, whether or not they had some kind of differential fact of historical or any other nature (what Minister Manuel Clavero Arévalo, who resigned because of this issue, called "coffee for all"). Other important laws, passed in the midst of social contestation, were the Statute of Workers and the Statute of Teaching Centers. Negotiations for joining the European Economic Community dragged on in the face of the reluctance of some countries (especially France), which, added to the increase in unemployment and inflation, in the midst of the second oil crisis, contributed to a bleak outlook, in which the so-called "years of lead" must be emphasized. The separatist group ETA killed 240 people between 1978 and 1980, especially members of the army, the Civil Guard and the police. ETA's bloodiest year was 1980, when they killed 91 people. The political situation was becoming increasingly untenable. The PSOE presented a motion of censure, which was rejected, but it showed the loneliness of the government. Within the party that supported it, the UCD, the different families (Christian Democrats, Liberals, Social Democrats) began to show ever greater differences of opinion among themselves and with the president. The King himself also let his uneasiness about the political situation and his loss of confidence in Suarez be made public, and his Christmas message of 1980 was interpreted in this way, in spite of the fact that such a function does not correspond to the King in the Constitution. By the beginning of 1981, Suarez understood that he had no other way out but to resign.

==== 23 February coup d'état and government of Leopoldo Calvo-Sotelo (1981–1982) ====
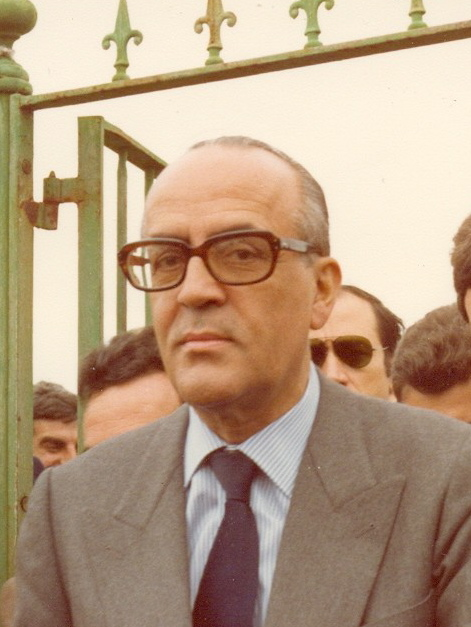
Leopoldo Calvo Sotelo was the shortest-serving prime minister in the democratic era.

The resignation of Adolfo Suárez, who had lost the confidence of most of the leaders of his own party, precipitated preparations for a coup d'état, and during the investiture session of his replacement, Leopoldo Calvo-Sotelo (February 23, 1981), a detachment of civil guards led by Antonio Tejero occupied the Congress and kidnapped the deputies and the entire government. Simultaneously, Jaime Milans del Bosch militarily occupied the city of Valencia and Alfonso Armada, former secretary of the royal house, tried to obtain the king's support to form a government of civil-military concentration. The opposition of the king and the lack of coordination and difference of objectives among the coup plotters prevented most of the military authorities from joining them, and the following day they surrendered.

Among the most outstanding events of Calvo Sotelo's government was the integration of Spain into NATO (May 30, 1982) and the approval of the divorce law (June 22, 1981), promoted by Minister Francisco Fernández Ordóñez and which had aroused intense opposition from the Spanish Episcopal Conference, becoming one of the main causes of disagreement within the government party. The autonomic process attempted to be harmonized by means of the LOAPA (June 30, 1982), a restrictive law which was later dismantled in essential aspects by the Constitutional court (August 13, 1983).

=== Governments of Felipe González (1982–1996) ===
==== Legislatures with a majority (1982–1993) ====
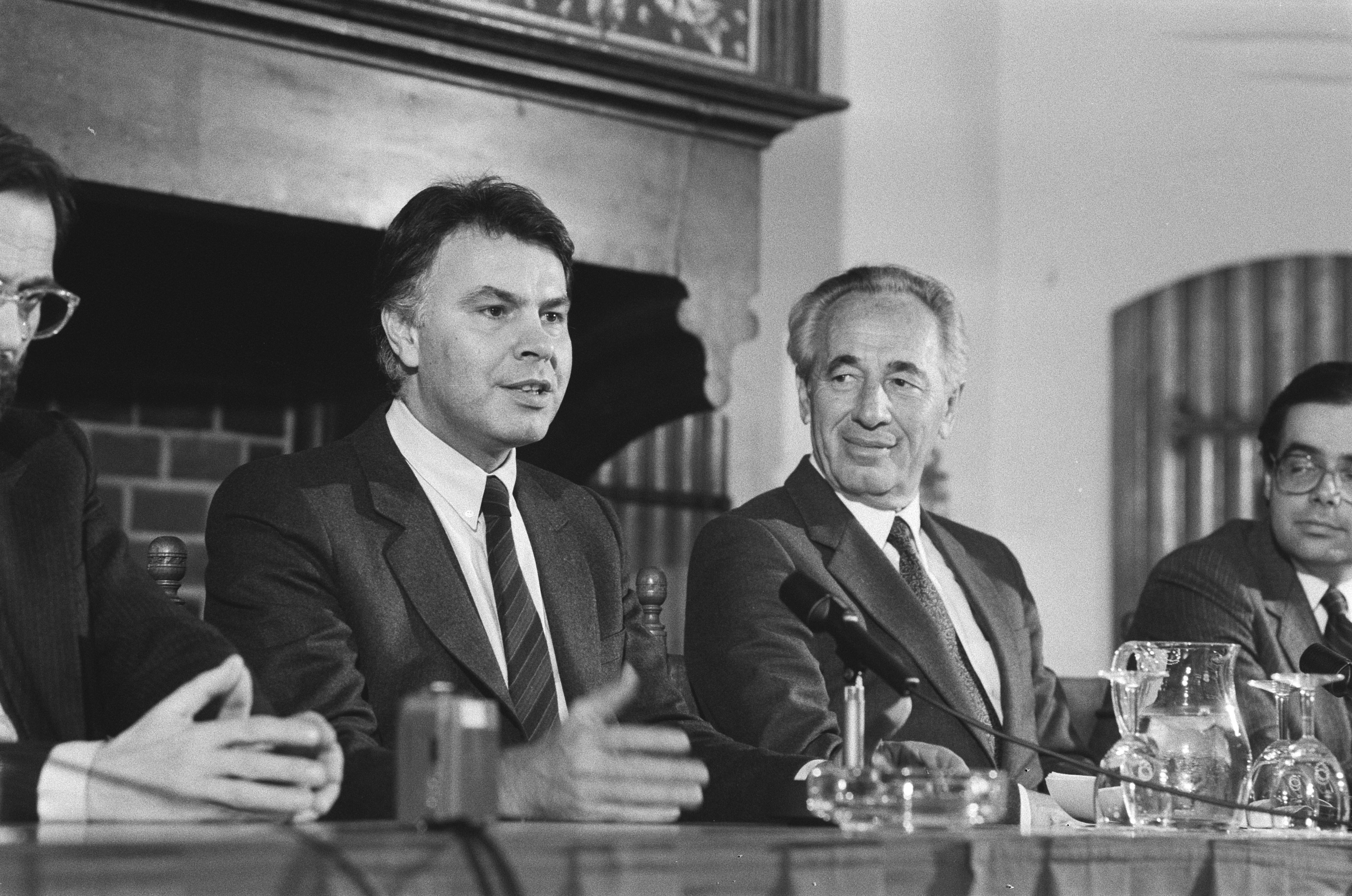
Felipe González with Israel's prime minister Shimon Peres in 1986.

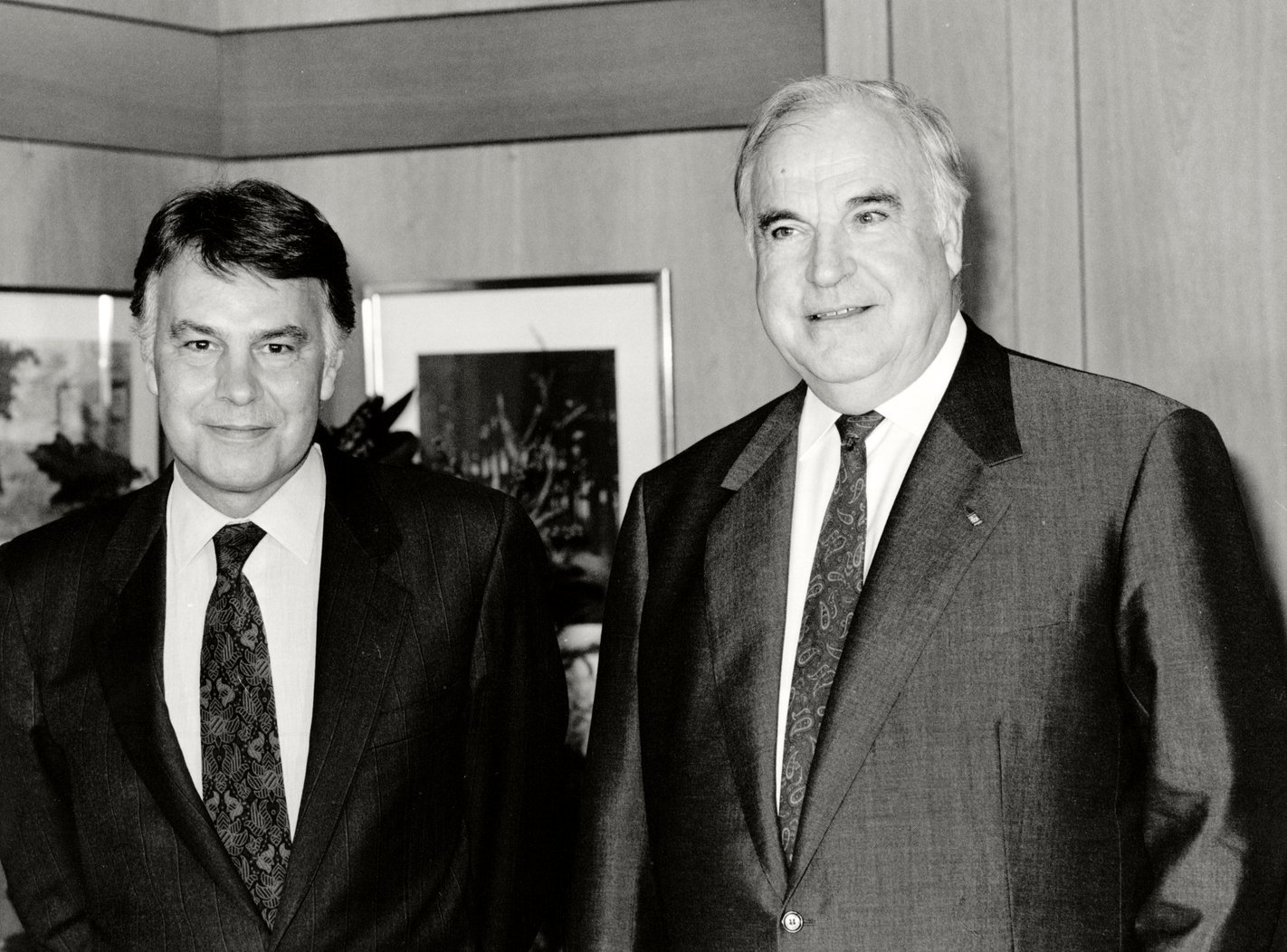
González with the chancellor of Germany, Helmut Kohl in 1993.

In the general elections held on October 28, 1982, the PSOE, led by Felipe González, obtained an absolute majority (202 seats) by winning more than 10 million votes, or 48% of voter support. Alianza Popular (AP) became the second political force with 106 seats. Meanwhile, the collapse of the UCD and the PCE which obtained eleven and four seats, respectively, presided over the trend of bipartisanship that was to preside from then on over Spanish political life.

The new government had to face the economic crisis, while at the same time implementing measures typical of a social democratic welfare state, increasing public spending on social policies (universal health care with the General Health Law of 1986, increase in pensions and unemployment coverage, LOGSE of 1990 which extended compulsory schooling to 16 years of age). The negative effects on employment of industrial reconversion and restructuring, added to other liberalizing measures, such as the flexibilization of the labor market or of business hours, provoked the radical opposition of the UGT and CCOO unions, which called the general strike of December 14, 1988, which paralyzed the country. The rift had been evident since the historic leader of the UGT, Nicolás Redondo, resigned as a PSOE deputy in 1987 after voting against the budget. In June 1992 and January 1994, union calls for general strikes against Socialist governments were repeated.

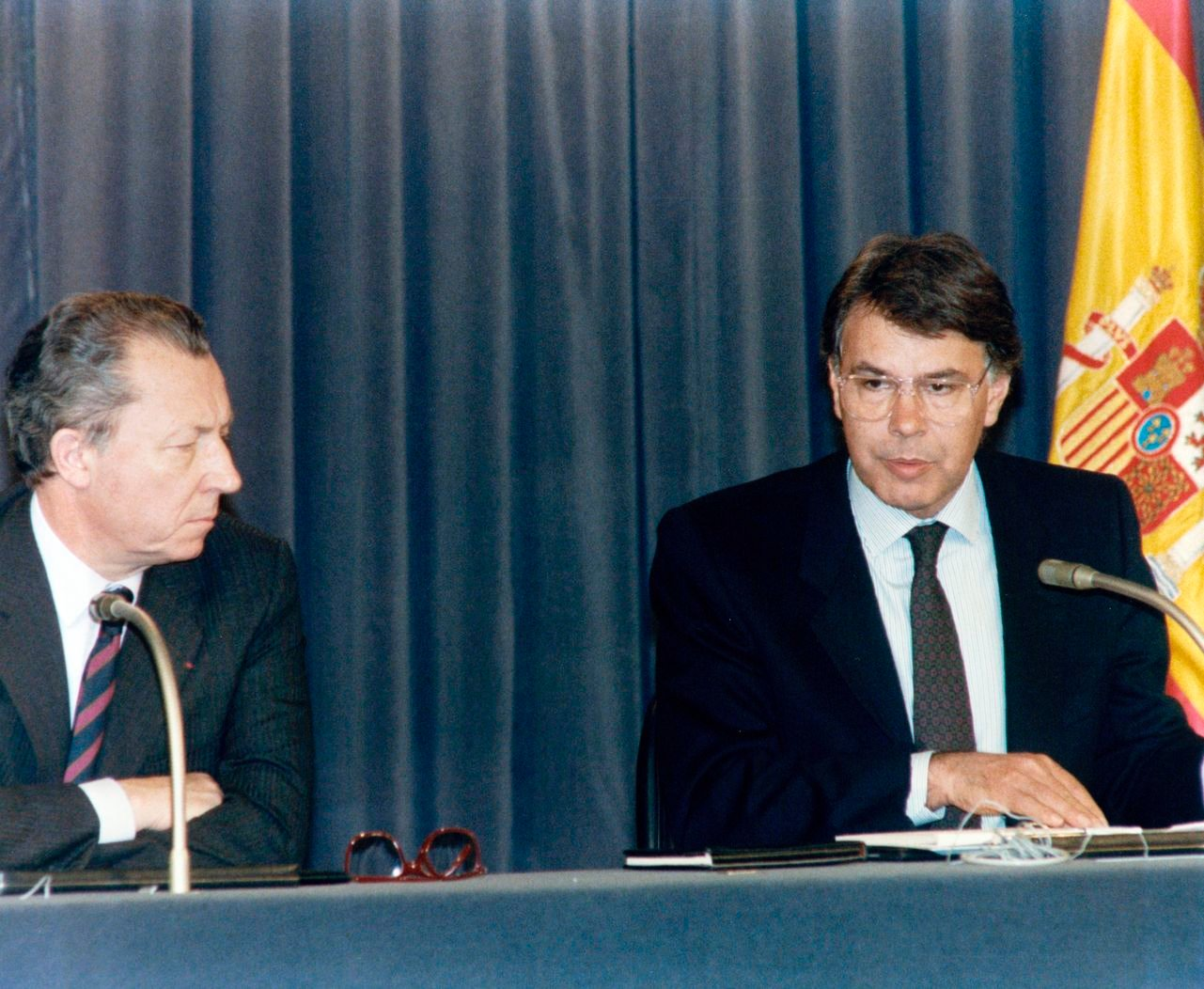
Felipe González with the president of the European Commission, Jacques Delors, in 1989.

Inflation was controlled and fiscal policy was improved (creation of the Tax Agency), reorganizing public accounts in such a way as to facilitate entry into the European Economic Community, whose accession treaty was signed in June 1985 (official entry on January 1, 1986). On March 12, 1986, NATO membership was guaranteed by means of a referendum to which Felipe González had committed himself when he was still in the opposition.

Per capita income doubled at the same time as the active population and the incorporation of women into the labor force increased. The migratory balance, traditionally negative, became positive, making Spain the largest receiver of immigrants in Europe and one of the largest receivers in the world. Cohesion Funds obtained from EU institutions were used to improve basic infrastructures. The fragility of economic growth, in a period known as the "pelotazo", due to the ease with which speculation took place, led to financial imbalances that forced several devaluations in the 1990s.

The autonomous process ended with the configuration of seventeen autonomous communities and two autonomous cities, which began to have their own institutions and legislation, and to coordinate with the state and municipal ones through highly complex negotiations, especially those related to financing.

There was still the problem of ETA violence, an organization that perpetrated two massacres in 1987, in a shopping mall in Barcelona and in the Casa Cuartel in Zaragoza. Due to this, the socialist government attempted all sorts of solutions: internal political pressure based on consensus among the democratic parties (Madrid Agreement on Terrorism of November 5, 1987 and the Ajuria Enea Pact of January 12, 1988), attempted negotiations (ETA truce of January 8, 1988, or the Algiers talks initiated earlier and maintained until April 4, 1988), and French police and judicial collaboration (linked to the improvement of political and economic relations). As it was later demonstrated (in a judicial process promoted among others by El Mundo, a right-wing newspaper, and by Judge Garzón who re-entered the judicial career after a brief and conflictive period in politics as a PSOE deputy), several high-ranking officials of the first Socialist governments (among them the minister José Barrionuevo and the secretary of security Rafael Vera) had promoted between 1982 and 1986 State terrorism or a dirty war through the activity of the so-called Anti-Terrorist Liberation Groups (GAL), which carried out several attacks in French territory against members of ETA.

==== Legislature in minority (1993–1996) ====
The "92" was a conjunction of events of such magnitude in Spain: the Olympic Games of Barcelona and the Universal Exposition of Seville, which also meant the realization of important road infrastructures such as the first high-speed railroad line (AVE) that linked Madrid with Seville. After that unrepeatable year, a period of crisis began that would last until 1997. The economic crisis (at the end of 1993 the unemployment rate reached 24% and in less than a year three successive devaluations of the peseta were carried out) was compounded by the excessive extraordinary expenditures made by the public administration for the "1992 celebrations".

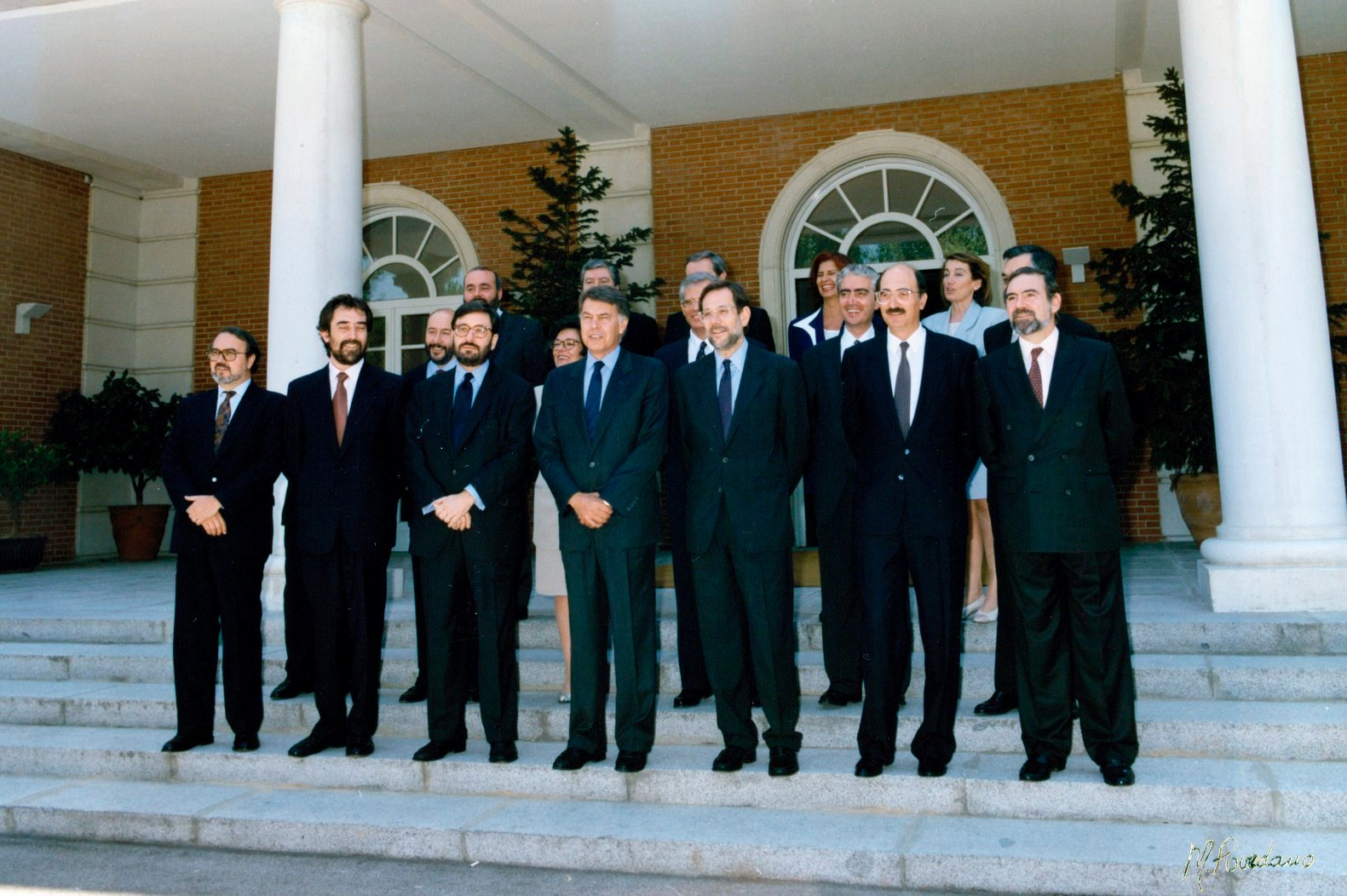
Photo of the socialist government in the V Legislature (July 14, 1993).

The V Legislature was marked by a climate of political tension generated by the public knowledge of corruption cases that directly affected the government of the State. Among them, that of the director of the Civil Guard, Luis Roldán and his embezzlement of public funds, and his subsequent flight from the country, and that of the governor of the Bank of Spain, Mariano Rubio, who was put on trial. At the same time, allegations of corruption implicated high-ranking officials of the Administration and government for their political responsibilities, and the judicial investigations continued with figures from the private sector. Among them, Mario Conde, after the intervention of the Bank of Spain in the banking institution he presided over, Banesto; and Javier de la Rosa, financially important after his intervention in the Kuwaiti multinational KIO.

In 1995, new scandals associated with the government appeared: the new declarations of the accused in the "GAL case", José Amedo and Míchel Rodríguez, provoked the reopening of the case by the judge of the Audiencia Nacional, Baltasar Garzón. This case involved José Barrionuevo and Rafael Vera, minister and secretary of state, respectively, of the Ministry of the Interior during the 1st González Legislature; both were judged by the Supreme court and sentenced to prison sentences for kidnapping and embezzlement in 1998.

On May 28, 1995, municipal elections were held throughout the State and regional elections were held on the same day in all the Communities except Andalusia, Catalonia, Galicia and the Basque Country, the Partido Popular won in ten autonomous communities and was the most voted party in 42 provincial capitals —for the first time in its history it managed to win a national election—.

The crisis of corruption cases, combined with the failure to comply with the parameters required for European convergence according to the Maastricht agreements, led to a rift between CiU and the PSOE. When the General State Budget Law was rejected in Congress due to the lack of support from Convergència i Unió, Felipe González dissolved the Parliament and called an early general election.

=== Governments of José María Aznar (1996–2004) ===
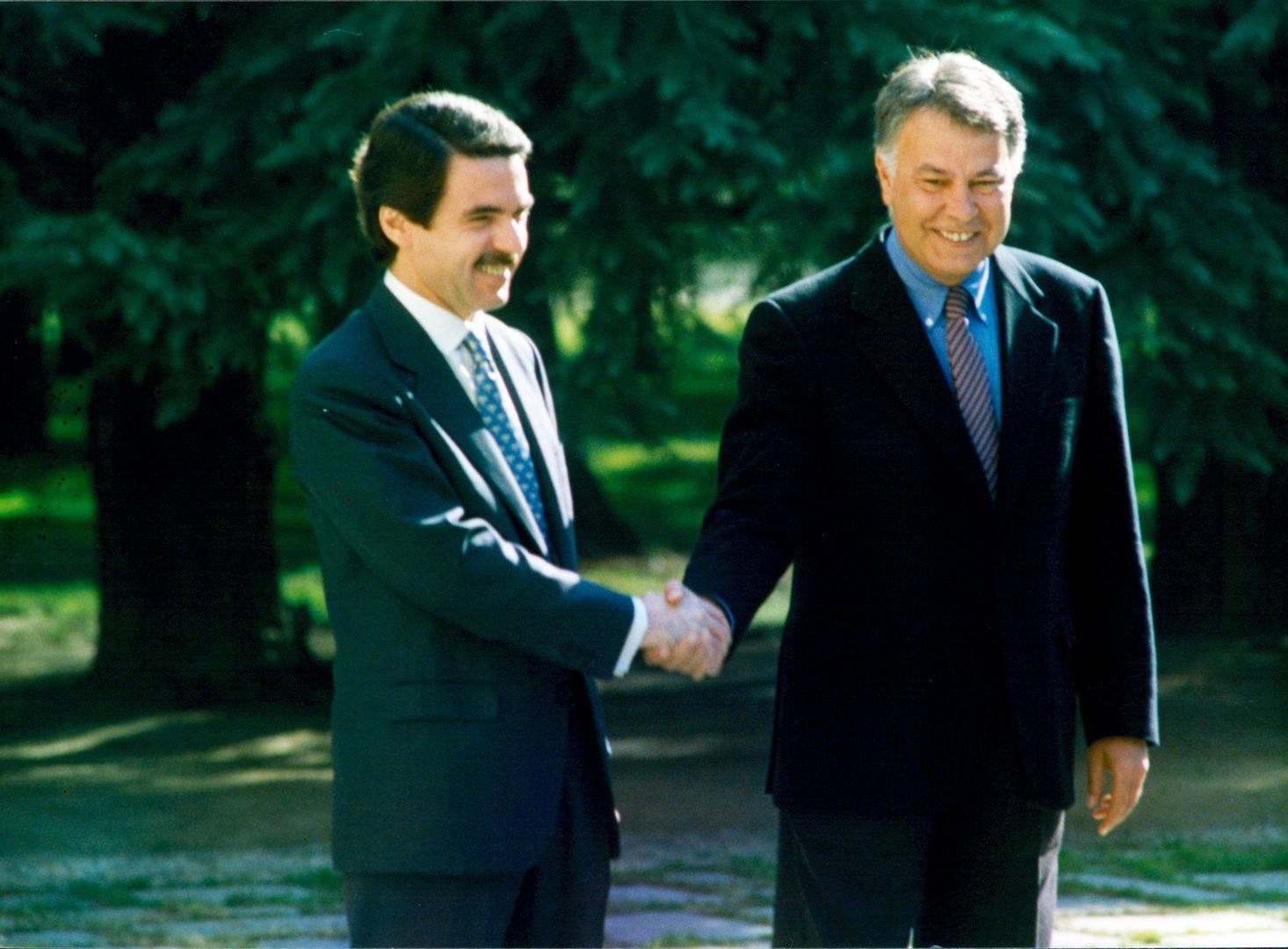
Aznar and Gonzalez in a handshake in the gardens of La Moncloa before discussing the transfer of power (March 1996).

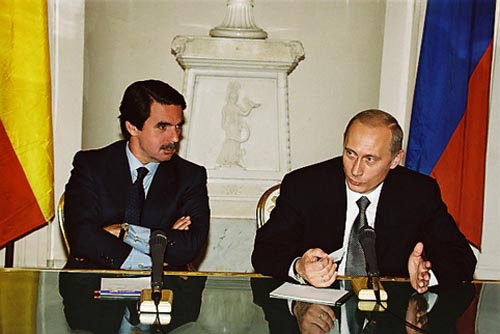
Aznar with the president of Russia, Vladimir Putin, on May 22, 2001.

On March 3, 1996, José María Aznar's Partido Popular won the general elections, although with a minimal majority. The PP obtained 156 seats and the PSOE 141. The difference in votes between the two parties was around 300,000 votes. As a result, for his investiture as President of the Government he had to reach a pact with CiU (with whom he had an arduous negotiation that ended with the Majestic pacts), the PNV and the Canary Islands Coalition (CC).

The new PP government set out to meet the convergence criteria of the Maastricht Treaty so that the Spanish economy could join the group of countries that would share the new European currency: the euro. The economic recovery was consolidated in the first period of the PP government. An anti-inflationary policy and budgetary rigor practiced by Rodrigo Rato, the privatization of state-owned companies and the excellent international situation made possible a period of economic growth, with unemployment and inflation falling. In 1999, with most of the criteria fulfilled, Spain was accepted as a member of the Eurozone, establishing a rate of 166.386 pesetas per euro. Peseta coins and banknotes ceased to circulate on March 1, 2002.

The police success of the release of prison officer José Antonio Ortega Lara, who suffered the longest kidnapping by the separatist group ETA (532 days) in inhumane conditions on July 1, 1997, was immediately overshadowed ten days later. On July 10, ETA kidnapped the PP councilman in the Biscayan town of Ermua (Basque Country) Miguel Angel Blanco. ETA's demands were unacceptable to the Aznar government: the transfer of more than 500 ETA prisoners to the prisons of the Basque Country within two days. After 48 hours of anguished waiting, in which millions of Spaniards mobilized in numerous demonstrations — in Bilbao the largest demonstration in its history was held — on July 12, ETA killed Blanco. ETA's reputation rapidly deteriorated, even among part of its social base in the Basque Country. A change of strategy was proposed and made public by the nationalist parties: the Lizarra Pact (September 12, 1998). Signed by the PNV, EA, Herri Batasuna and IU-Ezquer Batúa, the pact was a secessionist plan that committed itself to dialogue on some ETA postulates. Four days later, on the 16th, for the first time in its history, ETA declared an "indefinite truce", which led the government to accept the beginning of talks (November of that same year) which did not lead to any positive result, and which Minister Mayor Oreja later called a trap truce (September 1999). On November 28, 1999, ETA broke the truce.

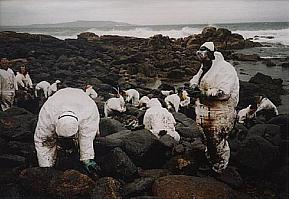

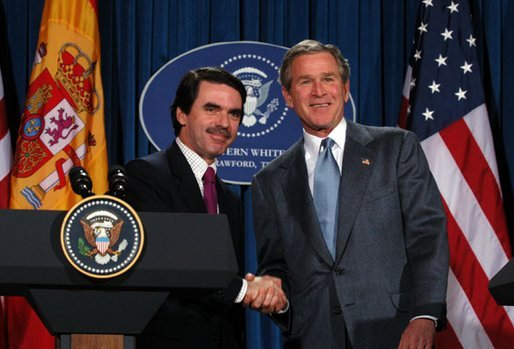
Aznar with U.S. president George W. Bush after a press conference at his ranch in Crawford (Texas). February 2003.

In the 2000 general elections, the PP won an absolute majority, which allowed it to carry out its policies without the constraint of seeking support from the peripheral nationalist parties. The year 2000 ended after a brutal ETA offensive in which 23 people were murdered. Trade union opposition to the new labor reform decree was substantiated in the general strike of 20-J (2002). Compulsory military service was abolished and the National Hydrological Plan was promoted.

In foreign policy, Aznar clearly aligned himself with the United States, becoming one of its main European allies (Azores trio) in the conflicts following the terrorist attack against the US (9/11): the war in Afghanistan and the war in Iraq. The ecological disaster caused by the Prestige oil tanker accident (2002–2004, possibly aggravated by the confused political management, which generated the Nunca Mais protest movement) was added to the scandal resulting from the Yak-42 accident and the great opposition of public opinion to Aznar's support for the Bush Administration in its invasion of Iraq, without the consent of the UN (No to war protest movement), discrediting the government and the Popular Party, which nevertheless managed to maintain acceptable results in the autonomic and municipal elections of 2003, won by the PSOE (7,999,178 votes against 7,875,762 for the PP). Aznar had promised not to run in a third election. Three names were being considered to replace him as candidate: Rodrigo Rato, Jaime Mayor Oreja and Mariano Rajoy, who was finally chosen by the president himself.

Three days before the 2004 general elections, the 11-M attacks on several commuter trains in Madrid took place, resulting in 191 dead and 1858 injured, the worst terrorist attack in the history of Spain and Europe in peacetime. The attacks shocked the country and caused confusion within the government itself, which at first attributed them to ETA. After a united demonstration of repulsion held the following day, which brought more than 12 million people into the streets throughout the country, and as evidence began to emerge that the attacks were the work of Islamic terrorism (later disputed by the media — especially the newspaper El Mundo which continues to support alternative theories to the judicial investigation), the discontent and the idea that the attacks were the work of ETA and that they were the work of the Islamic terrorist group, the government's own government was unable to make any progress, the discontent and the idea that information about the authorship was being concealed began to circulate within the government, and on the same day of reflection illegal demonstrations were called in front of the headquarters of the Popular Party. In the general elections of March 14, the PSOE of Rodríguez Zapatero achieved an unexpected electoral success. The turnout was very high, over 77%, and the PSOE won more than 10,900,000 votes and 164 seats. Defeated by this punishment vote was Mariano Rajoy, head of the PP list.

=== Governments of José Luis Rodríguez Zapatero (2004–2011) ===
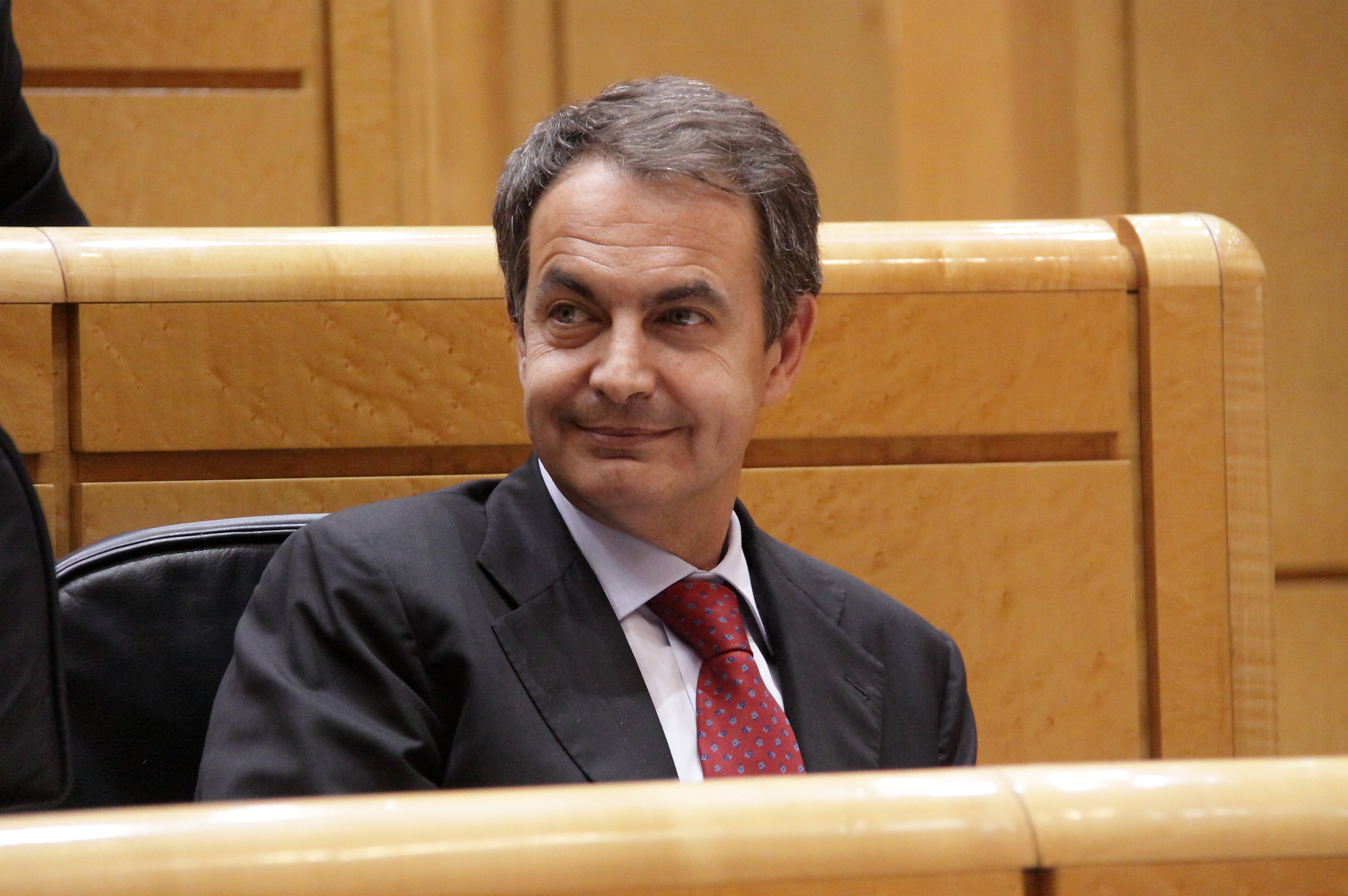
Zapatero in the Senate.

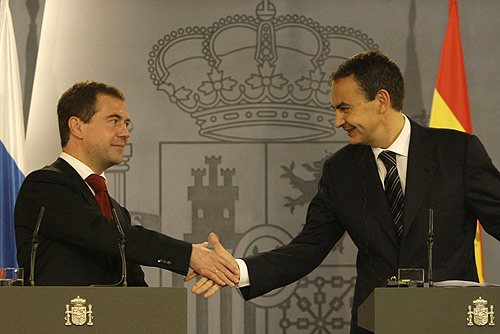
Zapatero in a handshake with the president of Russia, Dmitri Medvedev.

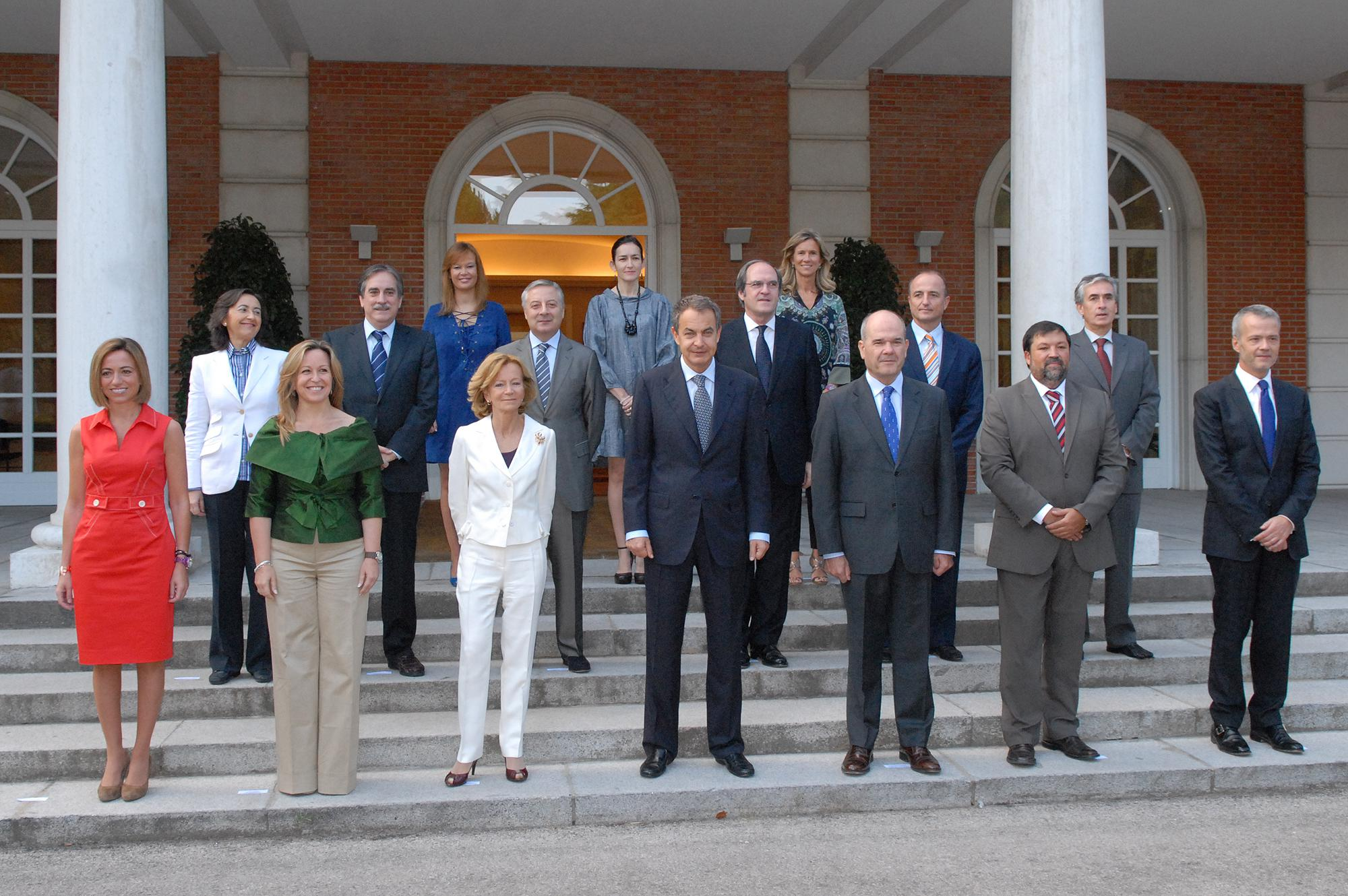

José Luis Rodríguez Zapatero made a significant statement on the second day of his term of office with a decision of great international impact: the withdrawal of Spanish troops from Iraq, in fulfillment of his electoral promise, although surprising for its immediacy, communicated even before the formation of his government. In domestic policy, the increase in the minimum wage (one of the lowest in Europe) opened the way for other social reforms, including the authorization of homosexual marriage (June 30, 2005), much protested by the Catholic Church, and the Dependency Law (November 30, 2006). Other social measures of great impact were the introduction of the points-based license for traffic offenses (2006) and the successive extensions of the smoking ban (2006 and 2011), which ended up being extended to practically all public spaces. Other issues were postponed for the following legislature, such as the reform of the abortion law (February 24, 2010).

Before the UN, Zapatero proposed the Alliance of Civilizations, an initiative of international collaboration which he co-led with the Turkish president Erdogan. The approval by referendum of the European constitution on February 20, 2005, was inoperative, given the failure of similar mechanisms in France and the Netherlands.

Several communities initiated the procedure for the reform of their statutes of autonomy. The so-called Ibarretxe Plan, not proposed as a statutory reform but as a sovereignty initiative for the Basque Country, was rejected by the Parliament (February 1, 2005). The reform of the Catalan Statute was even more controversial; despite passing through all the legislative procedures with various modifications and entering into effect after the referendum of June 18, 2006, it was the subject of an appeal of unconstitutionality processed in an eventful manner by the Constitutional court, which did not issue its ruling until June 28, 2010, restrictively interpreting certain parts of the text and invalidating others.

During almost the whole of 2006, government contacted ETA in a context of a "permanent ceasefire" declared by the terrorist group and protests by the Popular Party, the Association of Victims of Terrorism and the conservative-oriented media, which proved unsuccessful after the attack at T4 of Madrid-Barajas airport in which two people were killed (December 30, 2006). Police, judicial and international pressure proved to be more effective, which led to the consecutive arrests of the leadership teams that succeeded each other at the top of the terrorist group; and the prevention, by means of legislative reforms and judicial decisions, of the political groups organized around ETA from obtaining political representation in city councils and parliaments, as they were partially or totally outlawed in some or other elections (especially since the Anti-Terrorist Pact of 2000 and the Law of Parties of 2002, both with the consensus of PP and PSOE, which was maintained, with occasional tensions, with both parties in opposition or government positions).

During an Ibero-American conference there was a verbal incident between the King and the Venezuelan President Hugo Chávez, which became very popular ("¿Por qué no te callas?", November 10, 2007); and which is used as an example of the complexity of the relations between Spain and Latin America. These relations, intensified both economically and politically, are denounced as neo-colonialist by the indigenist current of opinion, while conservative opinion within Spain criticizes as counterproductive and naive the maintenance of relatively friendly relations with the government of Cuba and others of similar orientation, described as populist and contrary to Spanish interests.

After the general elections of March 9, 2008 (whose final campaign acts had to be suspended due to the murder of Isaías Carrasco by ETA), the majority of the PSOE and the second place of the PP were repeated. Both parties increased their number of deputies. The nationalist parties and Izquierda Unida decreased their representation, while a new national party appeared: Unión Progreso y Democracia, for which Rosa Díez obtained a deputy's seat.

The debate around the Law of Historical Memory, dating from the previous legislature, reached its peak as a result of Judge Garzón's decision to initiate legal proceedings against the crimes of Francoism (October 16, 2008); and the reaction against him, that, in addition to his removal from the case, which had no continuity, was substantiated in three simultaneous judicial proceedings for various reasons, some linked to that matter and others unrelated, but also with political repercussions, which led to his suspension as judge of the National Court, in the midst of an international scandal (May 14, 2010).

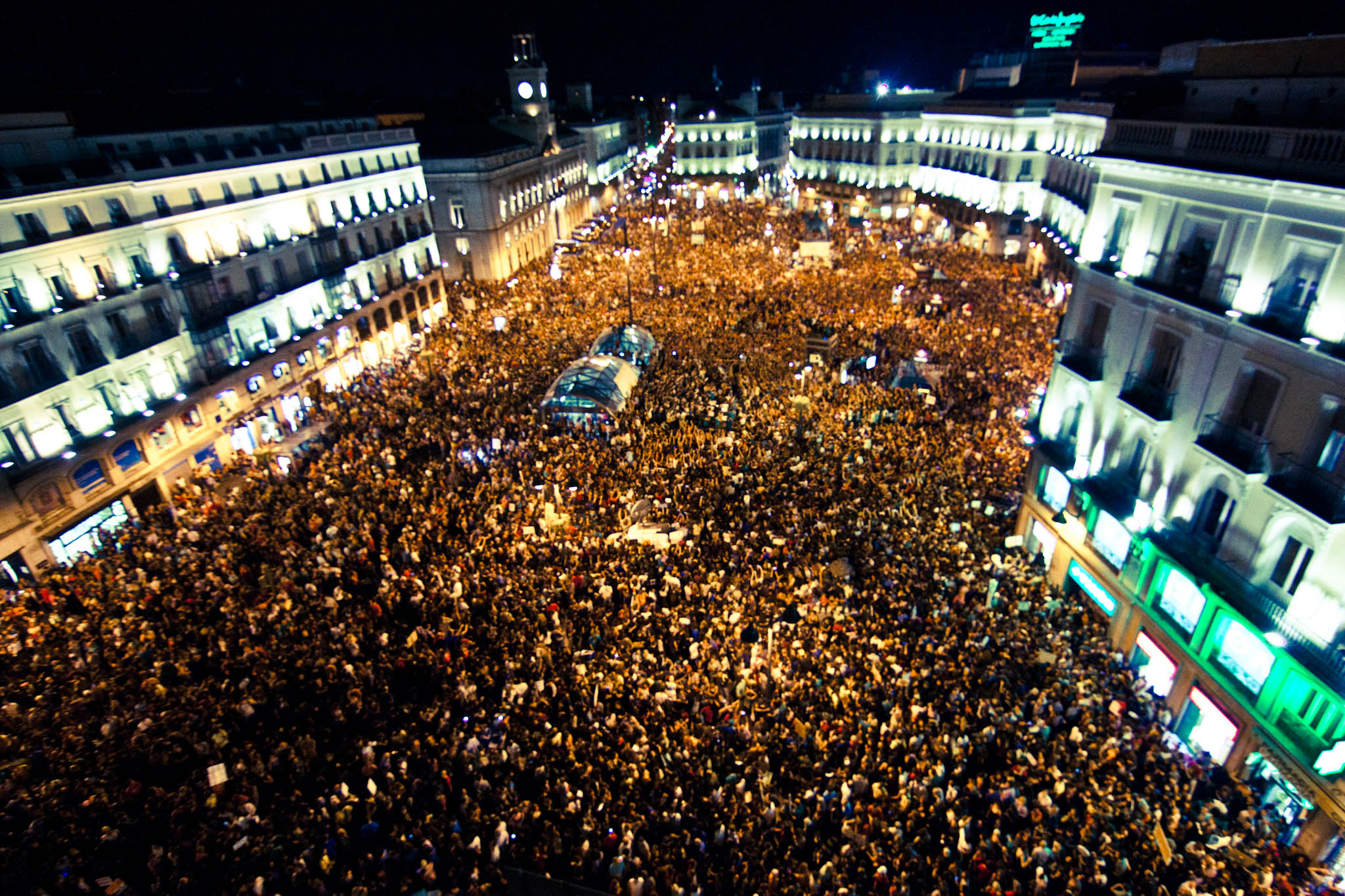
The Puerta del Sol in Madrid was the focal point of the protests of the indignados movement.

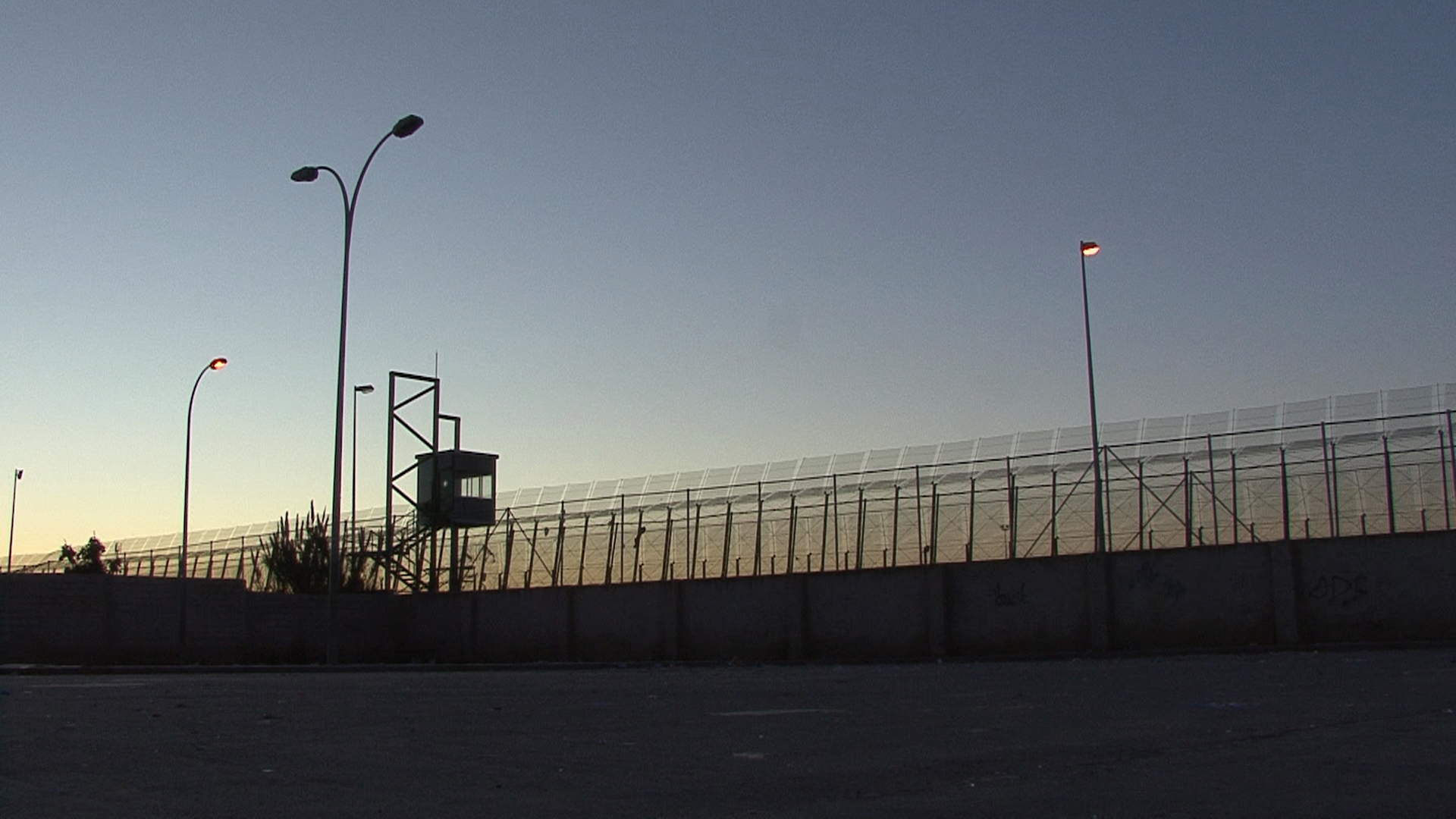
Melilla border fence. As the external border of the European Union, it is one of the points with the greatest migratory pressure. After the years of economic boom (1997–2008) when millions of immigrants arrived, reaching more than 10% of the population, the economic crisis turned Spain back into a country of emigrants. Most of these were immigrants returning to their countries of origin, although a considerable number were young Spaniards seeking better opportunities in other countries. The projections suggest a compromised future for Spanish demographics, in which only emigration could compensate for negative vegetative growth and aging.

The world economic-financial crisis (which began in 2008), added to a national real estate crisis, had a very serious impact on the Spanish economy, which, after experiencing the end of the so-called 2008 bubble, suffered several consecutive quarters of falling GDP and an increase in unemployment, which in the third quarter of 2011 reached the historic figure of five million unemployed (more than 20% of the active population); and even on the demographic structure, producing for the first time in decades a reversal of migratory movements (more emigration than immigration). The sovereign debt crisis in Greece, which became a true Eurozone crisis, led European governments, and even US president Barack Obama, to demand drastic measures to reduce the public deficit from Spain (which held the rotating presidency of the EU during that six-month period). Zapatero's decision (May 12, 2010) to reduce civil servants' salaries and not to increase pensions was described as an unprecedented measure in the history of Spanish democracy, questioning the maintenance of the welfare state model. The pressure of the debt markets on the peripheral countries of the European Union (known as PIGS) and the demanding attitude of German chancellor Angela Merkel even imposed a constitutional reform which was urgently carried out on August 23, 2011, by consensus of the two main Spanish parties (PP and PSOE), when Prime Minister Zapatero had already communicated his intention to dissolve the Parliament and call an early general election. In the Catalan autonomous elections (November 28, 2010), Convergencia i Unió won a victory without an absolute majority, which was enough for Artur Mas to be appointed president of the Generalitat, displacing the previous left-wing tripartite government.

The following elections gave victory to the Partido Popular, which managed to accumulate an unprecedented majority in the democratic period, with absolute majorities in most of the autonomous communities and city councils on May 22, 2011, and in Congress and the Senate on the November 20, 2011 (in the early elections held for the PSOE. Zapatero did not participate in the elections, replaced by Alfredo Pérez Rubalcaba — who obtained the worst results for his party since 1977 — while the representation of minority parties such as Izquierda Unida and Unión Progreso y Democracia increased.

The presence in the Basque institutions of the abertzale left, under the name Bildu, which won the mayoralty of San Sebastian and the Provincial Council of Guipuzcoa (municipal elections and the Juntas Generales, May 22, 2011), led to the convening of a so-called International Peace Conference in San Sebastian (October 17, 2011), received with varying degrees of skepticism by the other political groups and with the presence of international personalities. The final declaration of that conference was used by the terrorist group ETA to announce "that it has decided the definitive cessation of its armed activity" (October 20, 2011). After 829 fatalities, ETA put an end to 43 years of death and terror. The end of ETA's barbarity led to a remarkable electoral representation of the abertzale left, under the name of Amaiur, in the general elections (November 20, 2011).

Since May 15, 2011, the indignados or 15-M movement has been at the forefront of new social mobilizations, with characteristics similar to some extent to other simultaneous protest movements in other countries, such as the Arab Spring or Occupy Wall Street. More significantly, the role of the majority trade union centrals in social protests has been considered low-profile, despite the call for a general strike against the adjustment measures of May 2010 or the protests against cuts in autonomous communities governed by the PP since mid-2011 (notably, against the measures taken by the Ministry of Education of the Community of Madrid for the beginning of the 2011–2012 school year: Marea Verde). On the other hand, much more notable (and negative in most public opinion) was the social impact of large-scale strikes such as that of the Madrid Metro in June 2010 or air traffic controllers during Christmas 2010, which motivated an unprecedented government initiative: the declaration of a state of emergency.

=== First government of Mariano Rajoy (2011–2015) ===
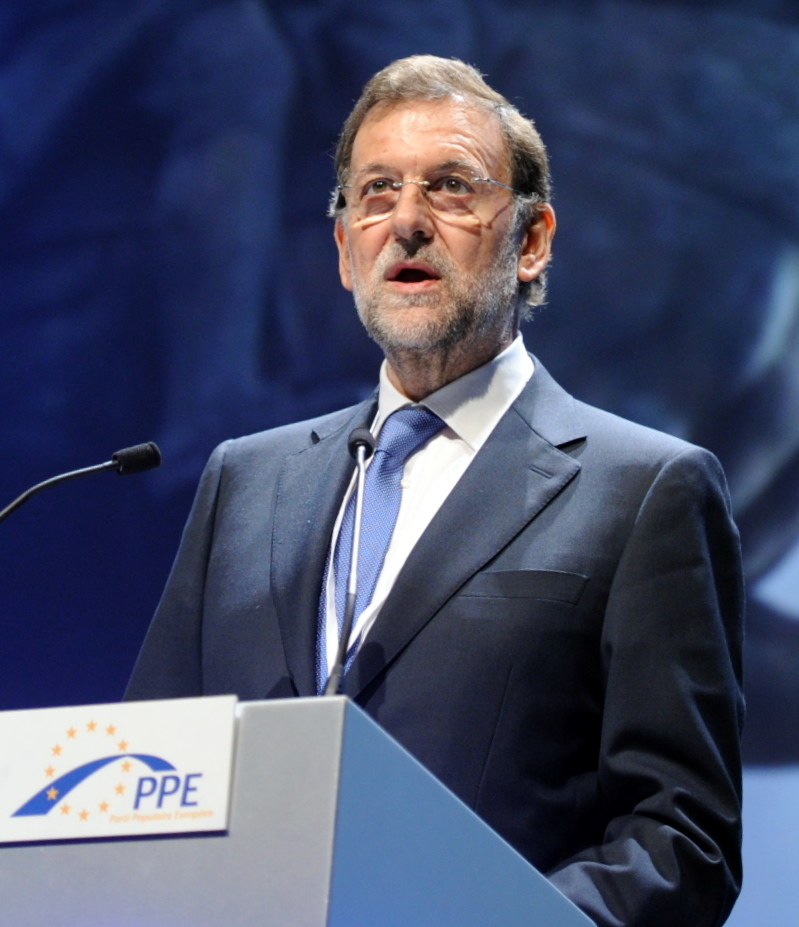
Mariano Rajoy addresses the convention of the European People's Party on December 8, 2011, after his electoral victory and a few days before being invested Prime Minister of Spain.

On December 21, 2011, Mariano Rajoy was installed as prime minister. Faced with the seriousness of the economic situation (recession and unemployment, which continued to increase) and the urgency of controlling the public deficit (whose figures deviated significantly from those declared until then, reaching over 8% of GDP), the new government of the Partido Popular decided to raise taxes (VAT and personal income tax), increase reduction of public spending in all areas of expenditure, including dependency, health, education, and research and development, and to promote reforms, particularly in the labour market with the reduction of the cost of dismissal and the application of collective bargaining agreements.

The financial crisis forced the nationalization of several institutions, among them Bankia (where several savings banks affected by the so-called real estate bubble had merged), and the request (June 9, 2012) for a "partial bailout" from the European Union (initially for a maximum of 100 billion euros, which materialized in 39 billion in December, amid rumors about the opportunity to request a "total bailout" of the Spanish economy, as the risk premium, the differential with the interest of the German ten-year bond, fluctuated).

The social protest was directed by the trade unions in two general strikes (29-M and 14-N) and in numerous sectoral strikes, together with massive mobilizations of a very different social base (Marea Verde, 25-S: surrounding the Congress, protests in the health and judicial fields). The only one that achieved a positive political reaction was the mobilization against evictions, centered on the demand for the payment in kind for mortgages.

There was also an increase in territorial-based protests. After a massive pro-independence demonstration on the Diada (September 11, 2012), Artur Mas called early regional elections (November 25), pledging to call a referendum aimed at turning Catalonia into "a new state of the European Union". Despite the poor results for his political force (he lost 12 seats), the advance of Esquerra Republicana de Cataluña allowed him to be re-invested president by agreeing with them on a "sovereigntist" program. The Basque regional elections (October 21) brought the PNV (Íñigo Urkullu) back to power, with a more moderate program, while Bildu became the second political force. Simultaneously, the Galician regional elections were held, which revalidated the absolute majority of the Partido Popular. Also in the Andalusian regional elections (March 25) the PP had been the most voted party, but the Andalusian government continued to be exercised by the PSOE, from then on in coalition with Izquierda Unida.

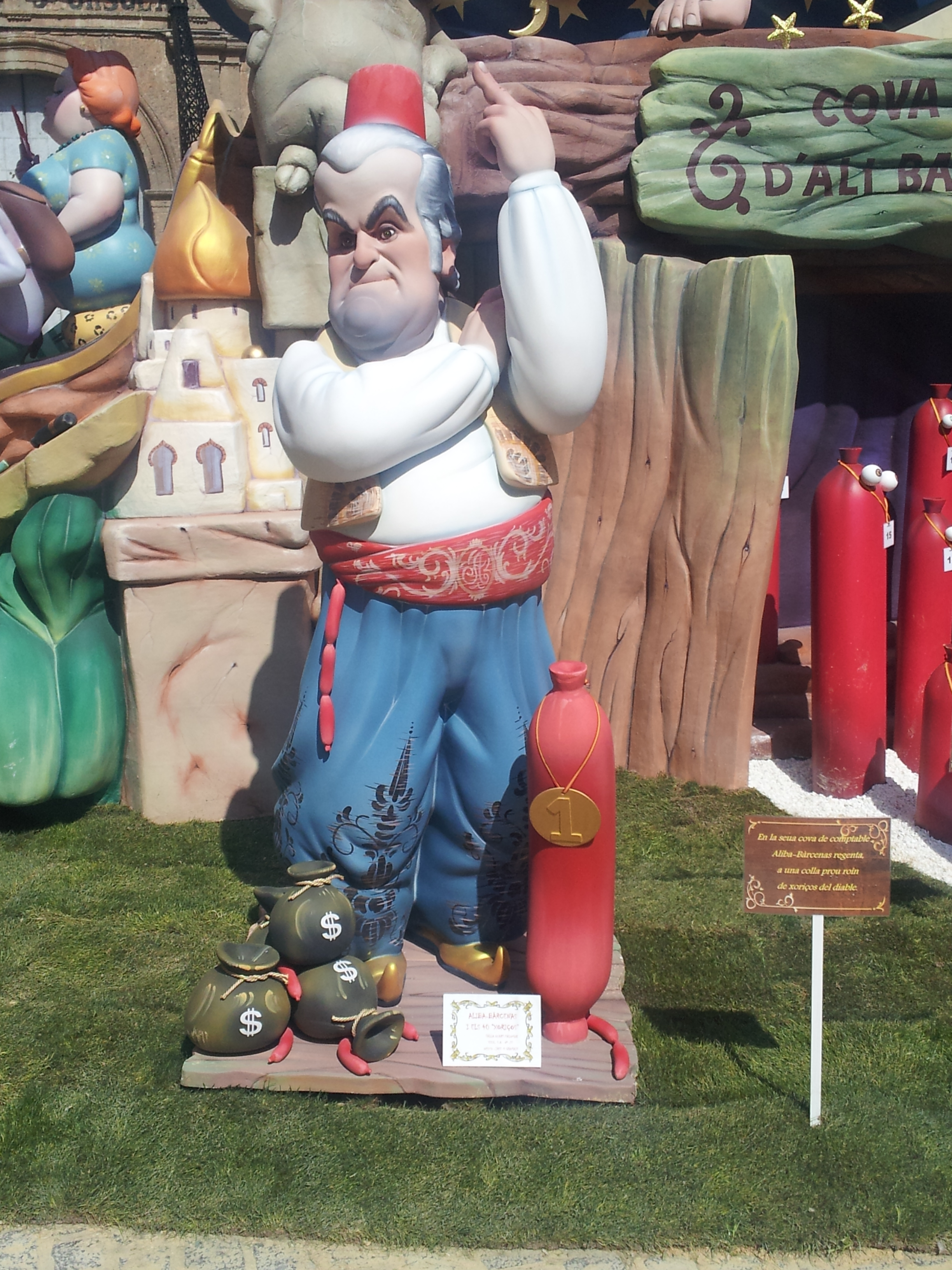
Ninot fallero representing the Bárcenas scandal. The obscene gesture was indeed made by Luis Bárcenas before the press after returning from a skiing vacation in Canada, in February 2013.

The corruption scandals, whose media repercussions were prolonged by the slow legal proceedings (the cases, already complex themselves, are complicated by the status as aforados of some of those involved, and remain open for years), affected practically all political, economic and social institutions. These include the Bárcenas affair (the treasurer of the PP, who would have collected illegal donations from individuals and companies interested in public procurement or political decisions, allocating them to the financing of the party, to the leaders' bonuses or to his own enrichment), ERE case in Andalusia (misuse of public subsidies, which affected members of the PSOE, including former presidents Manuel Chaves and José Antonio Griñán), the Nóos affair (company run by Iñaki Urdangarín, son-in-law of the king, which affected autonomous communities and city councils on the Balearic Islands mostly governed by the PP led by Jaume Matas), the Gürtel affair (which affected the PP of Madrid and Valencia), the Pujol case (which affected the former president of the Generalitat of Catalonia and his family), and the Bankia affair (which, through the scandal of preferential loans, the fraudulent IPO and "black cards", implicated all the parties and unions represented on the board of directors of the former Caja Madrid).

The president of the Catalan autonomous government, Artur Mas, announced at the end of 2013 a plan for a referendum on self-determination for Catalonia for November 9 of the following year. The pro-independence movement had led during the Diada of September 11 another massive demonstration, which on that occasion took the form of a 400 km human chain.

The elections to the European Parliament held on May 25, 2014, meant a strong punishment for the two main parties, PP and PSOE, which lost respectively 2.6 and 2.5 million votes; neither of them reached half of the votes (in the previous European elections of 2009 they had reached 81%). The other half of the votes was distributed among the various nationalist candidacies, La Izquierda Plural (10.03% of the votes, formed around Izquierda Unida and the Greens) and a group of emerging forces among which the Podemos candidacy stood out (7.98% of the votes, led by university professor Pablo Iglesias, created in January of the same year as one of the initiatives arising from the movement of the "indignados" of 15-M), while UPyD (6.5% of the votes) disputed its political space with Ciudadanos (3.16% of the votes). In the following months the possibility of collaboration between both forces was raised, but the contacts did not bear fruit and a serious internal crisis began in UPyD, while the expectations of Ciudadanos grew.

The prestige of the royal family suffered as a result of several scandals, including that of the Infanta Cristina (imputed, de-imputed and who finally declared as imputed in the prosecution of her husband Iñaki Urdangarín for economic crimes) and the accidents of one of her grandsons (who, despite being a minor, went shooting with his father, who was divorced from his mother, the Infanta Elena) and of King Juan Carlos himself (during an elephant hunt in Botswana that had not been communicated to the Government).

== Reign of Felipe VI (since 2014) ==
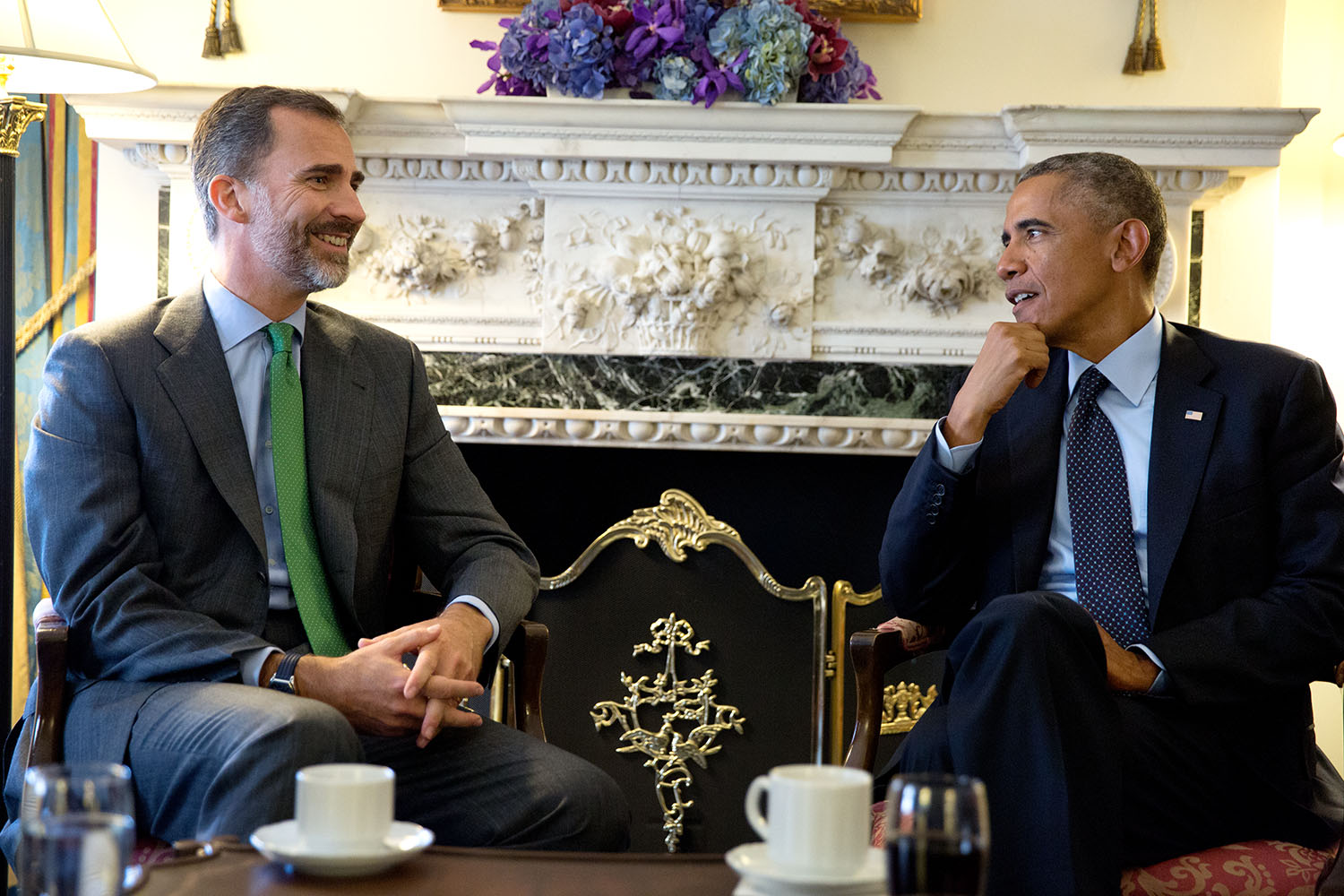
Meeting of Felipe VI with U.S. president Barack Obama in 2014.

On June 2, 2014 Juan Carlos I announced his abdication after almost 39 years of reigning. The decision had been taken five months earlier (coinciding with his 76th birthday, during the celebration of the military Easter services, his difficulties in making a speech became evident) and had been communicated to the president of the Government in the meantime.

On Thursday the 19th of that same month, the then-Prince of Asturias Felipe de Borbón took the oath of the Spanish Constitution before the Cortes Generales and was proclaimed King of Spain, reigning under the name Felipe VI.

On November 9, 2014, the Catalan autonomous authorities held an independence referendum that was not accepted by the State, of varied interpretation in terms of its significance and outcome (taking into account that there was no official census, the turnout is estimated at 37% of the possible voters, including resident foreigners and young people over 16 years of age; of the votes counted, 80% answered "yes-yes" to the questions posed, on a possible State and its independence), and which had judicial consequences.

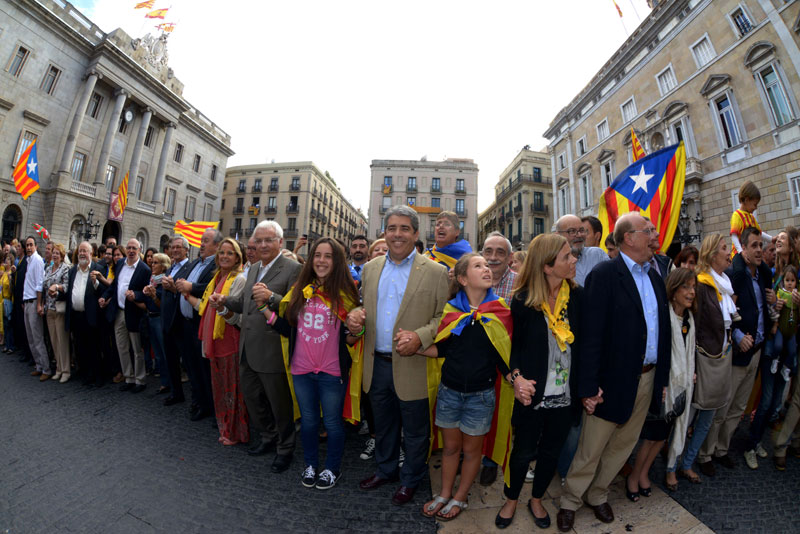
Pro-independence demonstration on the Diada of 11 September 2013 in the section corresponding to Plaça de Sant Jaume in Barcelona. Among those present was Francesc Homs, Minister of the Presidency, who the following year was among the organisers of the pro-independence referendum, for which he was charged.

The municipal and autonomic elections of May 24, 2015 confirmed the crisis of the two main parties (PP and PSOE), although they continued to be so, they summed between them little more than half of the votes when four years before they added two-thirds (particularly, the votes to the PP weren less). In the main cities, municipal government came to be exercised by candidates with origins in the "indignados" movement, in which Podemos participated, and which were subsequently supported by the traditional parties of the left: the mayor of Madrid, from the Popular Party since 1991, became the former judge and Human Rights activist Manuela Carmena (from the Ahora Madrid list); the mayor of Barcelona, a Socialist from 1979 to 2011 and since then from CiU, became the anti-eviction activist Ada Colau (from the Barcelona en Comú list). Several regional governments passed to the PSOE supported by Podemos (Aragón, Balearic Islands, Castilla-La Mancha and Comunidad Valenciana), while others remained in the PP supported by Ciudadanos. In Andalusia, which held its elections earlier, also due to the fact that they were early on March 22, the pact to invest Susana Díaz was between PSOE and Ciudadanos.

On September 27, 2015, autonomous elections were held in Catalonia, which the autonomous government, declaredly pro-independence, proposed as "plebiscitary", in the sense that the vote for the unitary candidacy called Junts pel Sí should be considered a vote for independence. The opposing parties did not accept such consideration and no joint candidacy was presented; a total of six political forces obtained representation. Junts pel Sí obtained 39.59% of the votes (separately its components had obtained 44.40% in the previous elections) and a smaller number of deputies (62 seats), insufficient to repeat the absolute majority they had (71 seats), but after several months of uncertainty they managed to form a government with the partial support of the CUP (8.21% of the votes), which demanded the replacement of the then president (Artur Mas) by another member of the same party (Carles Puigdemont). The coalition Convergència i Unió, that had dominated Catalan political life since 1980, was broken. Unió ran separately, obtaining no representation (2.51% of the votes), while Convergència (the party of Pujol, Mas and Puigdemont) ran together with Esquerra Republicana and other pro-independence supporters in Junts pel Sí. The second-most votes were for Ciudadanos (17.90%).

=== Acting Government of Mariano Rajoy (2015–2016) ===
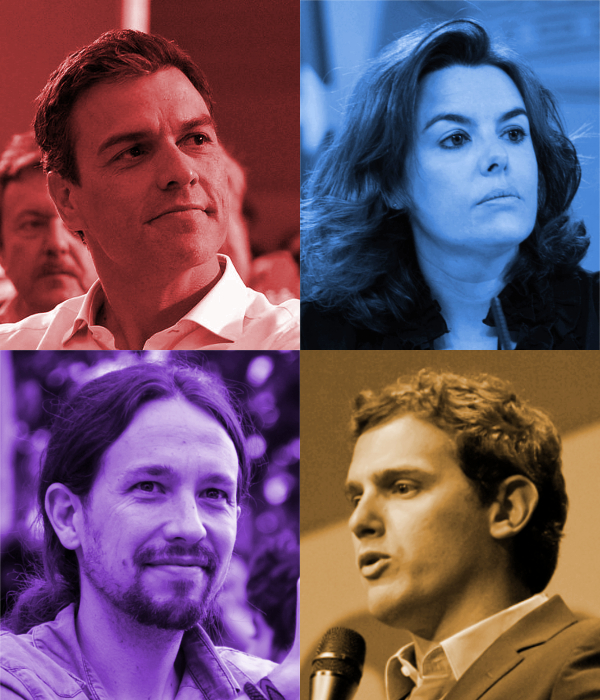
Participants in the "debate a cuatro" prior to the December 2015 elections.

In addition to the traditional debate between the candidates of the government party (Mariano Rajoy) and the main opposition party (Pedro Sánchez), and that took place with the traditional format established by the Television Academy; the interest aroused by the existence of two emerging parties (Podemos led by Pablo Iglesias and Ciudadanos led by Albert Rivera) led to a debate that Rajoy declined to attend, with the PP being represented by the vice-president Soraya Sáenz de Santamaría.

The general elections held on December 20, 2015 gave rise to an unprecedented situation with a great fragmentation of the vote in which the two parties that had been succeeding each other in government since 1982 (PP and PSOE) were not in a position to do so again. In the short, the XI legislature (it lasted only 111 days) was unable to invest a new president of the Government: Mariano Rajoy did not accept the king's proposal to form a government (his party, the PP, had obtained the highest number of seats: 123, 63 less than in the previous elections in which he had an absolute majority), while Pedro Sánchez did (his party, the PSOE, had obtained the second highest number of seats: 90, 20 less than in the previous elections), who only obtained the negotiated support of Ciudadanos (40 seats) and Coalición Canaria (1 seat), which was insufficient, given the vote against Podemos (69 in total, including the seats of the confluences in different territories), the PP and the nationalist parties. For the first time in democratic Spain, a candidate for the presidency of the government failed and did not win the confidence of the Congress, not even in the second vote.

The government continued "in functions" during the whole period, which seriously limited the capacity to carry out any kind of initiative of both the executive and the legislative wings, as well as parliamentary control of the government (this circumstance was the object of a conflict that was taken to the Constitutional Court). Even when a minister was forced to resign (José Manuel Soria, affected by the Panama Papers scandal) or was promoted to another position (Ana Pastor, who became president of Congress after the second elections), his or her functions had to be taken over by someone, as it was not possible to appoint a replacement. Once the deadlines foreseen in the Constitution had been met, the automatic call for general elections had to be applied. Paradoxically, in the meantime, economic indicators confirmed the positive data initiated in the last two years, both in terms of growth and employment, and which the government attributes to the results of its reforms, in addition to the favorable international context.

On May 3, 2016, King Felipe VI dissolved the XI Legislature after no candidate for the presidency of the Government had the backing of the House. He then signed the decree dissolving the Parliament and calling for new general elections.

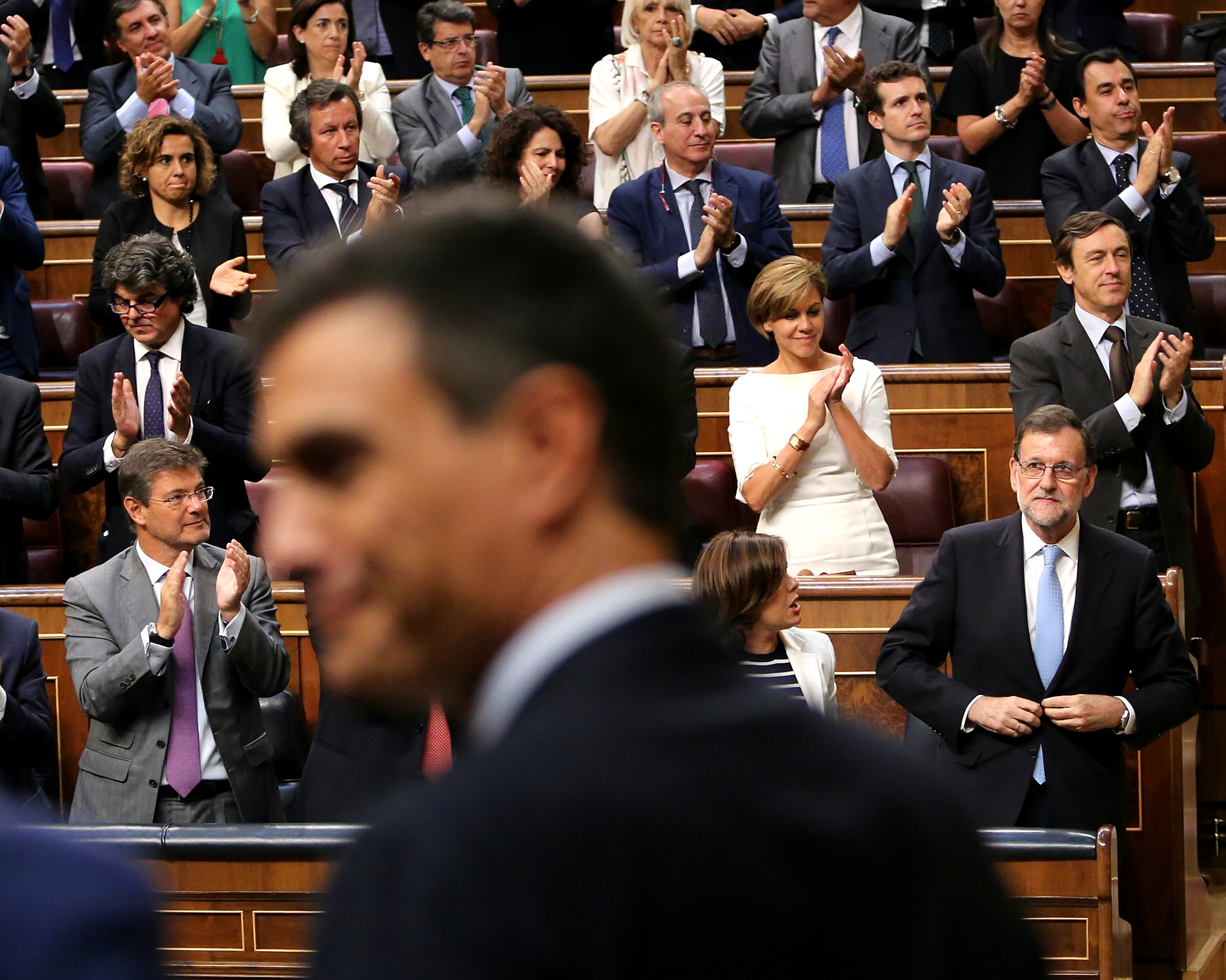
Pedro Sánchez in profile and in the center of the photo.

The new election was held on June 26 of the same year. The increase in votes and deputies of the Partido Popular (33% and 137 respectively) motivated Mariano Rajoy to accept the royal commission's invitation to form a government. The first attempt was unsuccessful, as he only had the support of the same parties that had previously supported Pedro Sánchez (Ciudadanos 32 seats, and Coalición Canaria 1 seat). After several months of uncertainty, in which the possibility of a new round of elections was seriously considered, the political situation changed drastically due to the internal crisis of the PSOE (Federal Committee of October 1, 2016), which replaced the then-Secretary General Pedro Sánchez (who was in favor of continuing to vote "no" to Rajoy's investiture and eventually exploring the possibility of a pact with Podemos — despite running together with Izquierda Unida, it had not achieved its expectations of surpassing the PSOE, losing more than one million votes — and the nationalists) with a representative, after which Rajoy's investiture session was repeated. In the first vote of the investiture session (in which an absolute majority is necessary) Rajoy obtained 170 yes (PP, Ciudadanos and Coalición Canaria) and 180 no votes. Two days later, in the second vote, he obtained 170 votes in favor, 111 against and the abstention of 68 of the PSOE deputies (except for 15 no votes, among them 7 belonging to the PSC, a Catalan party federated to the PSOE), allowing the formation of a government without the need for any concession on the part of the PP. Rajoy was sworn in as president by a simple majority after 315 days, and with two days left until the Parliament would be automatically dissolved and Spaniards were called again to elections.

=== Second Government of Mariano Rajoy (2016–2018) ===
On February 17, 2017, the court made public the sentence for the Nóos affair, Iñaki Urdangarin — son-in-law of the emeritus King Juan Carlos I—, was sentenced to six years and three months in prison for prevarication, embezzlement, fraud, influence peddling and two crimes against public finances. His wife, the Infanta Cristina, was acquitted. The following year, on May 3, 2018, the terrorist group ETA announced its dissolution after half a century of terror, kidnappings, extortion and more than 800 murders.

On April 19, public opinion became aware of another corruption case — the Lezo case — affecting an important popular leader: the former president of the Community of Madrid, Ignacio González was arrested by the Guardia Civil for having enriched himself with the diversion of public funds from the Canal de Isabel II and was imprisoned.

Thirteen years and five months later, Spain was once again the victim of a jihadist attack. Between August 17 and 18, 2017, 16 people were killed by an Islamic State terrorist cell in a double terrorist attack on Las Ramblas in Barcelona and in the early hours of the following day in Cambrils.

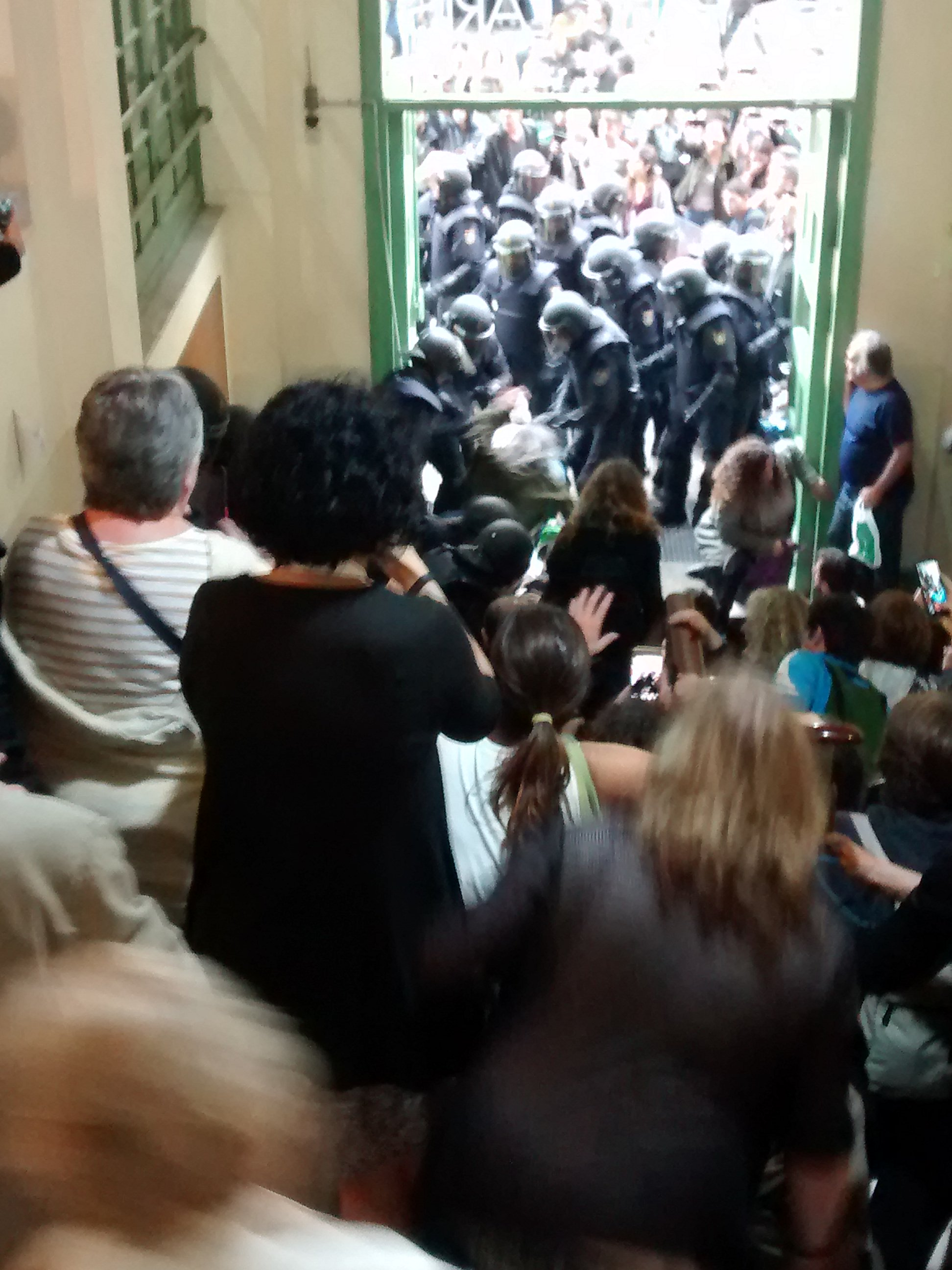
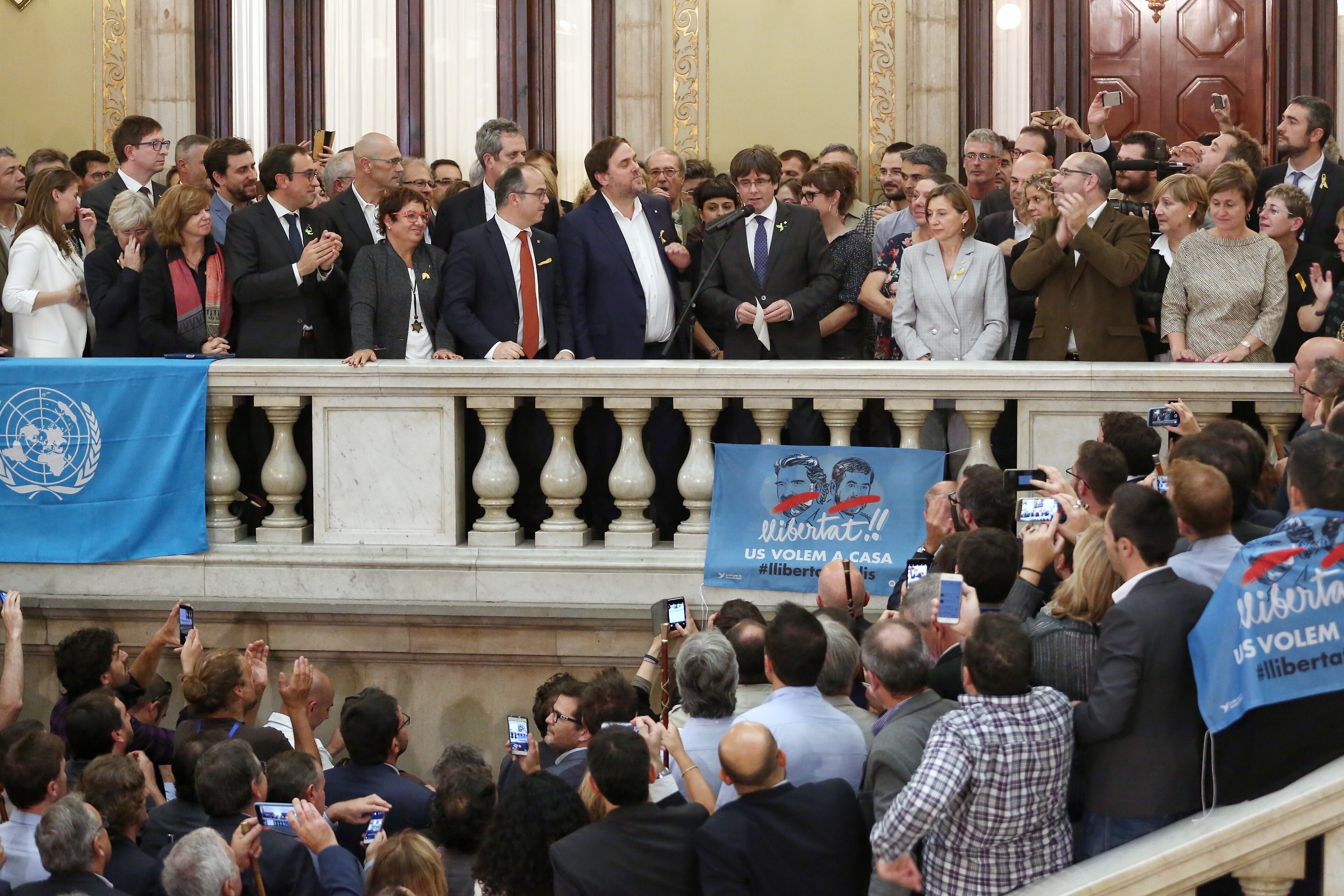

2017 ended as the most convulsive year since the establishment of democracy due to Catalonia's independence process, the biggest institutional crisis experienced in Spain since 23-F. The peak of independence sentiment was experienced in September and October. On September 6, the Parliament of Catalonia, with the support of Junts pel Sí and the CUP and in the absence of Ciudadanos, the PSC and the PPC, approved the referendum law. It was suspended by the Constitutional Court, which adopted the same decision for the Transitory Law approved the following day. On Sunday, October 1, the independence referendum was held without any democratic or judicial guarantee. The Police and the Guardia Civil intervened in some schools to comply with the court order to prevent the vote. Photographs of the police activity were seen around the world (CNN called them "the shame of Europe").

On the 3rd, a general strike was carried out in Catalonia in protest against the use of force by the Police and Civil Guard on 1-O. At nine o'clock in the evening, an institutional message from King Felipe VI was broadcast, who accused the Generalitat of "inadmissible disloyalty" and made calls to "ensure the constitutional order". On October 10, the president of the Generalitat, Carles Puigdemont, appeared in the Parliament. There he assumed the "mandate of the people" for "Catalonia to become an independent state in the form of a republic", but then offered to "suspend the effects of the declaration" to allow dialogue with Rajoy's government. On Saturday, October 21, the Spanish government complied with its announcement and approved the application of Article 155 of the Constitution, with the aim of restoring legality. This implied the dismissal of the Government in full and the intervention against any moves for autonomy. On Friday the 27th, the half-empty Parliament declared the independence of Catalonia in a secret vote. The Senate supported the request for Article 155 by absolute majority; Unidos Podemos, ERC, PNV and PDECat voted against. On that afternoon, the president of the Government, Mariano Rajoy, called a surprise election for December 21, in which for the first time a constitutionalist party, Ciudadanos led by Inés Arrimadas, won the autonomic elections, which broke a record of participation by exceeding 81% of the census, clearly in votes and seats but the pro-independence party revalidated its absolute majority. Junts per Catalunya finished as the second political force ahead of ERC. Its leader, the former president Puigdemont, together with several ex-counselors, fled to Brussels and remain there due to the fact that the Prosecutor's Office had filed a complaint against them for crimes of rebellion, sedition and embezzlement (for the first one alone they face sentences of up to 30 years in prison), and also emphasize that Judge Carmen Lamela decreed unconditional imprisonment for the former vice-president of the Generalitat, Oriol Junqueras and seven ex-counselors, while Santi Vila was imposed bail on November 2.

After the sentence of the National Court on the Gürtel affair in which it condemned the Popular Party for being a "system of institutional corruption", the secretary general of the PSOE, Pedro Sánchez, announced that his parliamentary group would carry out the fourth motion of censure of the democratic stage and the second against Rajoy. On June 1, this motion of censure triumphed with the support of the PSOE, Unidos Podemos, ERC, PDeCAT, Compromís, Nueva Canarias, EH Bildu and the PNV, and Pedro Sánchez was invested that day as the seventh president of the Spanish democratic government.

=== Government of Pedro Sánchez (since 2018) ===
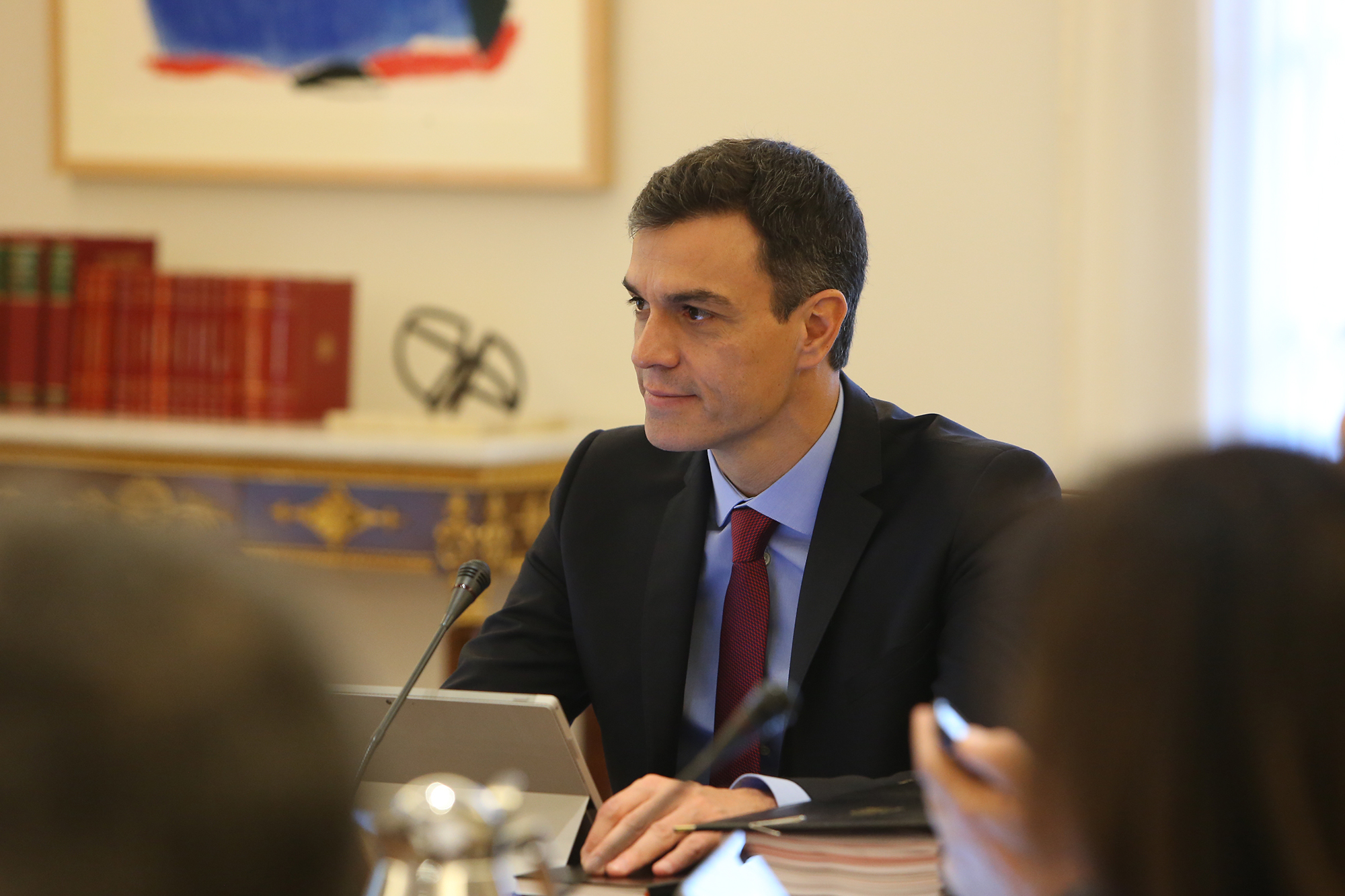
Pedro Sánchez presiding over a Council of Ministers at La Moncloa Palace in 2018.

On June 2, Sánchez pledged his office before King Felipe VI. The 17 members of his new Council of Ministers took office on June 7, becoming the government with the most female ministers in the history of democracy — 11 — and in which for the first time, after only 103 days of service by the executive, had suffered the resignations of two of its members.

On December 2, 2018, elections were held for the Junta de Andalucía in which the PSOE won again in the electoral appointment but did not achieve an absolute parliamentary majority —nor with the support of Adelante Andalucía—, however, the big news of that election day was the irruption of Vox (described by several media as an extreme right-wing party) with 12 seats. On January 16, 2019, the popular Juanma Moreno was invested president of Andalusia after a pact, putting an end to more than 36 uninterrupted years of socialist governments. On February 13 of that same year, the pro-independence deputies of ERC and PDeCAT were decisive in their vote against the first draft Budget of the Sánchez government, which precipitated that two days later, Pedro Sánchez called early general elections for April 28. Sánchez's executive was the shortest in the history of democracy (260 days).

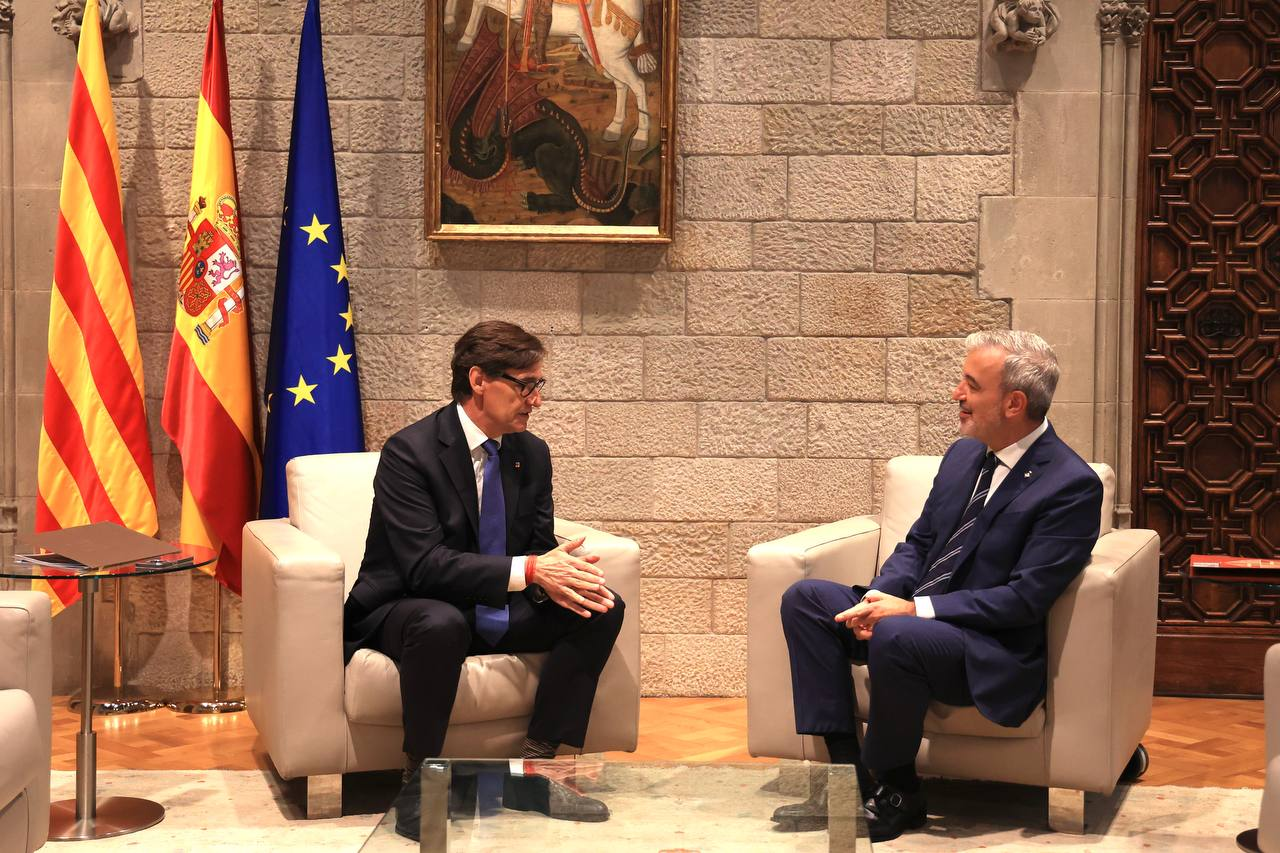
Socialist Salvador Illa, former minister of Health during COVID-19 pandemic in the first coalition Government in Spain, elected first non independentist Catalan regional president in over a decade, with also socialist Barcelona mayor Jaume Collboni.

In the 14th election after the establishment of democracy, the PSOE won with 123 seats, while the Popular Party suffered its worst electoral debacle by winning only 66 deputies, Ciudadanos won 57 and became the third political force in the country, overtaking Podemos, which was left with 42 deputies, losing 29 seats. The election night also saw the historical entry of Vox into Congress, with 24 deputies.

Between July 23 and 25, 2019, the investiture session of Pedro Sánchez as candidate for President of the Government took place, which was unsuccessful as the second session, which only requires a simple majority, had the support of the PSOE and the Regionalist Party of Cantabria.

In the fourth general election since 2015, the PSOE won again. The following day, Albert Rivera, one of the two politicians who helped create the rupture of the bipartisanship, resigned.

On October 14, 2019 the Supreme Court sentenced nine Catalan independence leaders who were convicted of sedition for their roles in organising the 2017 Catalan independence referendum. The ensuing riots in the Catalan capital caused more than three million euros worth of damage to street furniture. More than 1,000 containers were burned and some 6,400 square meters of pavement were affected. On the 24th of the same month, Francisco Franco's exhumation was carried out.

==== Pandemic ====
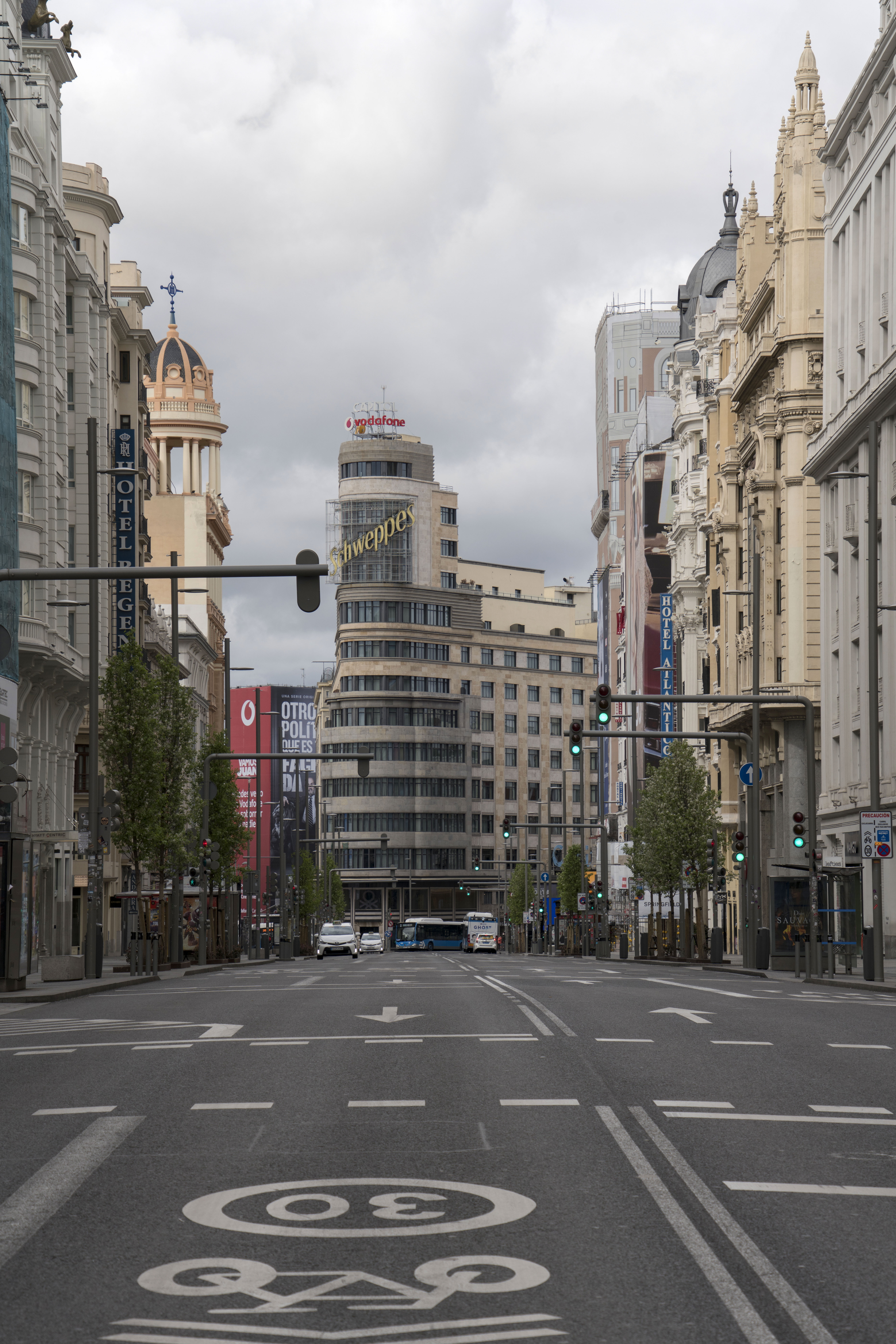
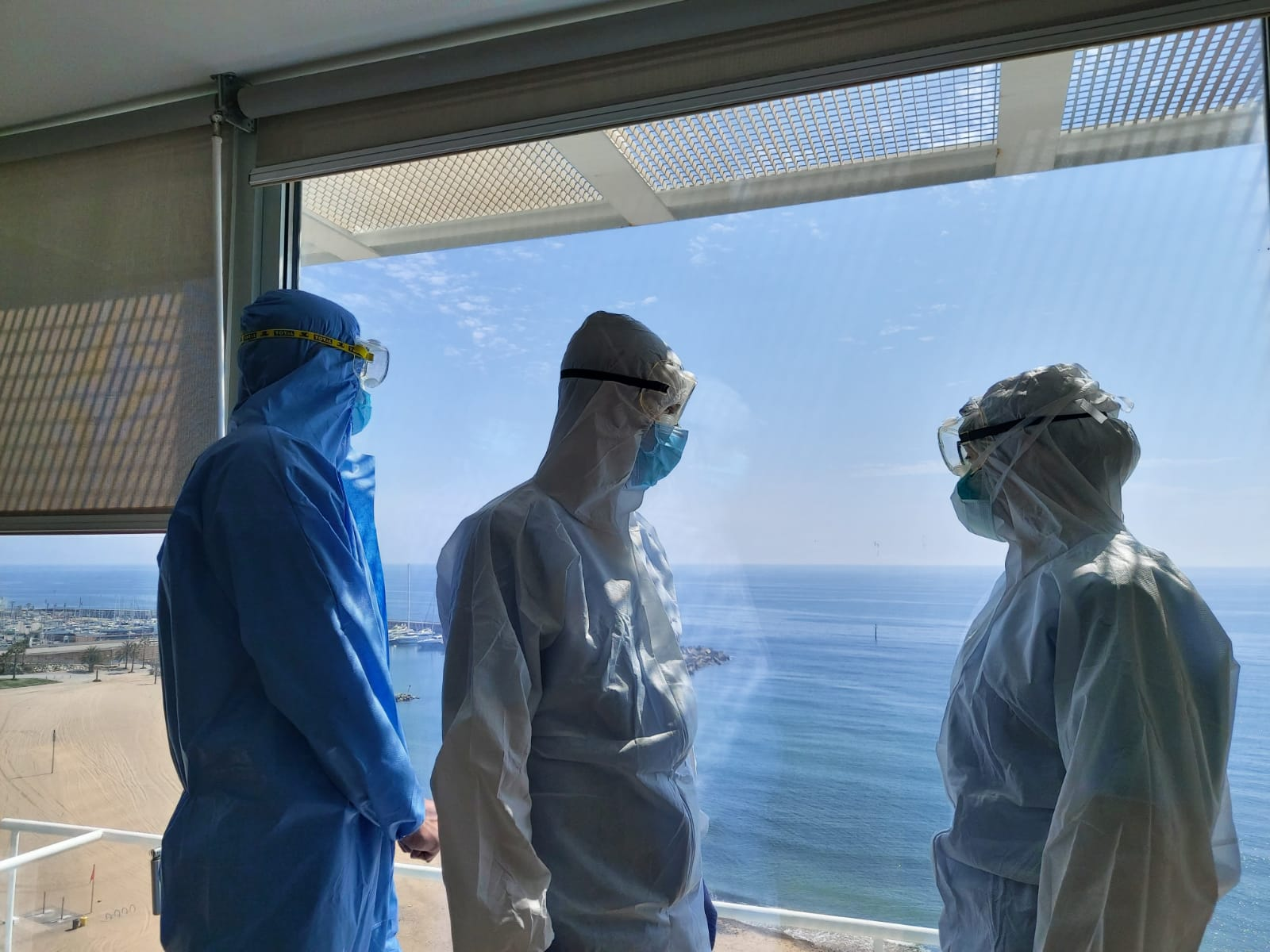

Due to the COVID-19 pandemic beginning in 2020, the government of Pedro Sanchez declared for the second time in democratic times a state of alarm, decreeing the lockdown of the entire population on March 13 after an extraordinary Council of Ministers that lasted more than 7 and a half hours.

After the first wave of the coronavirus pandemic, with an economy in recession and a general feeling of uncertainty, Spain, as with the rest of European countries, bent the curve of contagions and implemented a set of relaxed restrictions. However, after the end of the summer period, the Spanish nation entered a second wave of the pandemic, predicted by scientists, which led to new lockdowns and restrictive measures, as well as the declaration, for the third time in the democratic era, of a new state of alarm. Spain suffered the loss of thousands of its citizens, the infection of millions more and the loss of tens of thousands of jobs since the beginning of this convulsive period of contemporary history.

== See also ==
- Accession Treaty of Spain to the European Economic Community
- Economic history of Spain
- Foreign relations of Spain
- List of wars involving Spain
- Peninsular War
- Regenerationism
- Spanish nationalism
- History of Spain (1808–1874)

== Bibliography ==
- Miguel Álvarez-Fernández, Luis de Pablo: Inventario (in Spanish). Madrid: Ediciones Casus Belli, 2020, ISBN 978-84-947072-8-5
- José Álvarez Junco Mater Dolorosa. La idea de España en el siglo XIX (in Spanish), 2002
- Juan Avilés, Juan Francisco Fuentes, Germán Rueda et al. Historia de España (in Spanish), Madrid: McGraw Hill, 2009, ISBN 978-84-481-6938-1
- Julio Aróstegui La Guerra Civil, 1936–1939, (in Spanish), Madrid: Temas de Hoy, 1997
- Miguel Artola La burguesía revolucionaria (1808–1874) (in Spanish), Alianza, 1973
- Ángel Bahamonde España en democracia. El Sexenio, 1868–1874 (in Spanish), Madrid: Temas de Hoy, 1997
- Ángel Bahamonde y Luis Enrique Otero Historia de España (in Spanish), Madrid: SM, 2009, ISBN 978-84-675-3478-8
- M. Balanzá, J. Roig et al. Ibérica. Geografía e Historia de España y de los Países Hispánicos (in Spanish), Barcelona: Vicens Vives, 1994, ISBN 84-316-3480-4
- Raymond Carr, (ed.) Raymond Carr, Edward Malefakis, Richard Robinson, Stanley Paine, Burnett Bolloten, Ramón Salas Larrazábal, Ricardo de la Cierva, Robert H. Whealey and Hugh Thomas Estudios sobre la República y la Guerra Civil Española (in Spanish), Madrid: Ariel-Sarpe, 1985 ISBN 84-7291-863-7
- Javier Cercas Anatomía de un instante (in Spanish), 2009
- Carlos Dardé La Restauración, 1875-102. Alfonso XII y la regencia de María Cristina (in Spanish), Madrid: Temas de Hoy, 1997
- Julio Gil Pecharromán La Segunda República. Esperanzas y frustraciones (in Spanish), Madrid: Temas de Hoy, 1997
- Antonio Fernández García y otros Historia (in Spanish), Barcelona: Vicens Vives, 2003, ISBN 84-316-5831-2
- Josep Fontana La quiebra de la monarquía absoluta (in Spanish), Ariel, 1971
- Josep Fontana (ed.) Jordi Solé Tura, Juan Pablo Fusi, José Luis García Delgado, Fabián Estapé, José Antonio Ferrer Benimeli et al., España bajo el franquismo (in Spanish), Barcelona: Crítica, 1986 ISBN 84-7423-284-8
- Fernando García de Cortázar and José Manuel González Vesga El rapto de España, capítulo XIII de Breve Historia de España (in Spanish), Madrid: Alianza, 1993, ISBN 84-206-0666-9
- Genoveva García Queipo de Llano El reinado de Alfonso XIII. La modernización fallida (in Spanish), Madrid: Temas de Hoy, 1997
- Santos Juliá Madrid, 1931–1934, de la fiesta popular a la lucha de clases (in Spanish), Madrid: Siglo Veintiuno, 1984.
- Santos Juliá Historia Contemporánea en Historia de España (in Spanish), de Julio Valdeón, Joseph Pérez and Santos Juliá, Espasa Calpe-Austral, 2003 ISBN 84-670-1041-X
- Francisco Javier Paredes Alonso, Historia contemporánea de España (in Spanish),. Ed. Ariel, 1998. ISBN 978-84-344-6603-6
- Ana Guerrero, Juan Sisinio Pérez Garzón and Germán Rueda, Historia Política, 1808–1874 (in Spanish), Madrid, Ediciones Istmo, 2004. ISBN 978-84-7090-321-2
- José Mª Marí, Carme Molinero, Pere Ysàs, Historia política de España, 1939–2000 (in Spanish), Madrid, ed. Istmo, 2000.
- Jesús A. Martínez (Coord.), Historia de España. Siglo XX, 1936–1996 (in Spanish), Madrid, ed. Cátedra, 1999.
- Miguel Martínez Cuadrado La burguesía conservadora (1874–1931) (in Spanish), Alianza, 1973
- Abdón Mateos and Álvaro Soto El final del franquismo, 1958–1975 (in Spanish), Madrid: Temas de Hoy, 1997
- Jordi Nadal El fracaso de la revolución industrial en España (in Spanish), 1975
- Stanley G. Payne, El primer franquismo, 1939–1959. Los años de la autarquía (in Spanish), Madrid: Temas de Hoy, 1997
- Jaime Prieto Historia de España (in Spanish), Madrid: Bruño, 2009 ISBN 978-84-216-6454-4
- Manuel Tuñón de Lara (dir.), Historia de España (in Spanish), Barcelona, Labor, 1980. (complete work) ISBN 84-335-9431-1

- Emiliano Fernández de Pinedo, Alberto Gil Novales and Albert Dérozier, Centralismo, Ilustración y agonía del Antiguo Régimen (in Spanish), vol. 7
- Gabriel Tortella, Casimiro Martí, José María Jover, José Luis García Delgado and David Ruiz González Revolución Burguesa, oligarquía y constitucionalismo (in Spanish), vol. 8
- Pierre Malerbe, Manuel Tuñón, Carmen García-Nieto y José Carlos Mainer, La crisis del Estado. Dictadura, República, Guerra (in Spanish), vol. 9
- José Antonio Biescas and Manuel Tuñón España bajo la dictadura franquista (in Spanish), vol. 10

- Javier Tusell La transición española. La recuperación de las libertades (in Spanish), Madrid: Temas de Hoy, 1997 ISBN 84-7679-327-8
- Juan Velarde Fuertes, Cien años de economía española (in Spanish), Encuentro, 2009, ISBN 84-7490-960-0
- Pierre Vilar La Guerra Civil Española (in Spanish), Barcelona: Crítica, 1986, ISBN 84-7423-285-6

Preceded by Modern history of Spain	Contemporary history of Spain	Succeeded by –
