= List of constitutions of Spain =

Overview of Spanish constitutions

Spain has proclaimed a number of Constitutions. The current Constitution of Spain of 1978 is the culmination of the Spanish transition to democracy.

The idea of a national constitution for Spain arose from the Declaration of the Rights of Man and of the Citizen initiated as a result of the French Revolution. The earliest constitution was written and promulgated in 1808 when Napoleon invaded Spain, Bourbon monarchs Ferdinand VII and Charles IV abdicated, and Napoleon placed his brother Joseph Bonaparte on the throne. A constitution was drafted and the Junta Española Joseph I signed it. A major feature of the Constitution of 1808 was the provision for representation by Spanish America on an equal basis with the peninsula. Although signed by Spanish aristocrats and the new monarch, few in Spain recognized this document.

With the eruption of the Peninsular War to oust the French invaders. A new Cortes was summoned and met at Cádiz, which included Spanish American and Philippine delegates, and promulgated the Spanish Constitution of 1812. This constitution is generally recognized as Spain's first written constitution since it was drafted freely by delegates of the Spanish Empire.

During Francoist Spain, there were many attempts to create stable institutions that did not (at least directly) emanate from Francisco Franco as they did in the post-war period. The Fundamental Laws of the Realm (Spanish: Leyes Fundamentales del Reino) were a constitution in parts enacted through nearly 20 years starting in the 1950s. Most of those Laws theoretically provided for a quite free state, but ultimately the power of the Caudillo was supreme. They established the very institutions that would later, under Juan Carlos I and Prime Minister Adolfo Suárez, commit "constitutional suicide" and pass the Political Reform Act, starting the Spanish transition to democracy.

Finally, the constitution in force is similar to the (unwritten) British democratic monarchy model, but the 2014 Catalan self-determination referendum has provoked calls for an entirely democratic federal republican model.

Below there is a comprehensive table, but this is an overview:

- 1808–1814 Bayonne Constitution - Napoleonic restructuring from royal edict to the bicameral parliament
- 1812 Constitution of 1812 - The first attempt at decentralization
- 1814 Constitution of 1812 - derogated by the King, absolutist monarchy restored
- 1820–23 Reinstatement of the Constitution of 1812
- 1834 Absolute monarchy
- 1837 Constitutional monarchy
- 1845 Regency empowerment
- 1856 Failed attempt at democracy
- 1869 Another failed attempt at democracy
- 1873 First Spanish Republic
- 1876 Failed attempt to become a federal republic
- 1931 Second Spanish Republic
- 1936 Martial law under Francisco Franco
- 1939 – 1978 Francoist Spain
- 1978 Transition to democratic monarchy

== Table ==
Name	In force	Form of government	Democracy	Repealed	Observations
Bayonne Constitution; Royal Charter	1808–1814	Constitutional monarchy	Bicameral parliament with semi-elective lower house.	Peninsular War lost by Joseph I.	Not recognized by the Spanish patriots during the war. Most of its contents were to be enacted through the 1810s, so it did not actually come into effect. However, it provided for representation from Spanish America and the Philippines.
Constitution of 1812	1812–1814; 1820–1823; 1836–1837	Constitutional monarchy	elected parliament.	Ferdinand VII reinstated absolutism in 1814 and again in 1823. Superseded in 1837.	Weakened the power of the monarch, strengthened the role of the legislative Cortes, gave representation to Spanish America and the Philippines, extended equal citizenship to all free men in the Empire, universal manhood suffrage, established public education from primary school through university, freedom of the press, maintained Roman Catholicism as the state religion.
Royal Statute of 1834; Royal Charter	1834–1836	Constitutional monarchy	Bicameral parliament with elected lower house and appointed Senate.	Regent forced to reinstate the 1812 Constitution after a military pronunciamiento.	Granted by Maria Christina in order to get support from the liberals in the First Carlist War.
Constitution of 1837	1837–1845	Constitutional monarchy		Superseded.	Partially suspended by Baldomero Espartero to rule by decree between 1840 and 1843.
Constitution of 1845	1845–1869	Constitutional monarchy	Parliament elected by censitary suffrage.	Isabella II and her Government was overthrown in the Glorious Revolution of 1868.	Doctrinaire attempt to exploit the plots against the young Isabella and the Regency in order to reinforce the monarchy
Constitution of 1856	Not enacted	Constitutional monarchy	Parliament elected by censitary suffrage.	Scrapped by the new government.	Passed by the Parliament but not enacted by Isabella II as moderate liberals returned to power.
Constitution of 1869	1869–1876	Constitutional monarchy	Parliament elected by universal male suffrage.	Republic declared by the Cortes after the abdication of Amadeo I.	An interim compromise between royalist conservatives and republican progressives
Constitution of 1873	Not enacted	Federal republic	Bicameral parliament elected every two years by universal male suffrage.	Arsenio Martínez Campos led a successful pronunciamiento restoring the Bourbon monarchy.	Republic collapsed before even passing the Constitution, mainly due to wide disagreement over the federalism vs centralism issue.
Constitution of 1876	1876–1931	Constitutional monarchy	Parliament elected, firstly by censitary, then universal male suffrage from the 1890s.	Republic instated after Alphonse XIII fled Spain.	While theoretically democratic, elections were routinely rigged by the governing party, and in practice power was shared by two alternating parties (the turno system). During Primo de Rivera's dictatorship (1923–1930) many of its articles were suspended in a de facto dictatorship.
Constitution of 1931	1931–1939	Parliamentary republic	Unicameral parliament, firstly with universal male suffrage, then female suffrage from 1933.	Civil War lost by the Republican side.	During the Civil War (1936–1939) it was abolished by the Nationalists and widely disregarded in the Republican zone.
Fundamental Laws of the Realm	1938–1978	Military dictatorship	Partially elected unicameral parliament with little powers of its own.	Superseded when Parliament adopted the Constitution of 1978.	A set of laws enacted by the dictator Francisco Franco in order to shape his political regime and adapt it to changes. The individual laws passed under Franco are: Fuero del Trabajo (1938), Ley Constitutiva de las Cortes (1942), Fuero de los Españoles (1945), Ley del Referéndum Nacional (1945), Ley de Sucesión en la Jefatura del Estado (1945), Ley de Principios del Movimiento Nacional (1958), and Ley Orgánica del Estado (1967). The Law for Political Reform (Ley de Reforma Política) of 1977, last of the Fundamental Laws and passed after Franco's death, started the Spanish transition to democracy.
Constitution of 1978	1978–present	Constitutional monarchy	Parliamentary democracy with bicameral, elective parliament.	Currently in force.	First in Spanish constitutional history not to grant any emergency power (i.e. sacking the PM, dissolving the Cortes) to the Head of State.
