= Spanish Constitution of 1812 =

First Constitution of Spain

Constitution of Cádiz
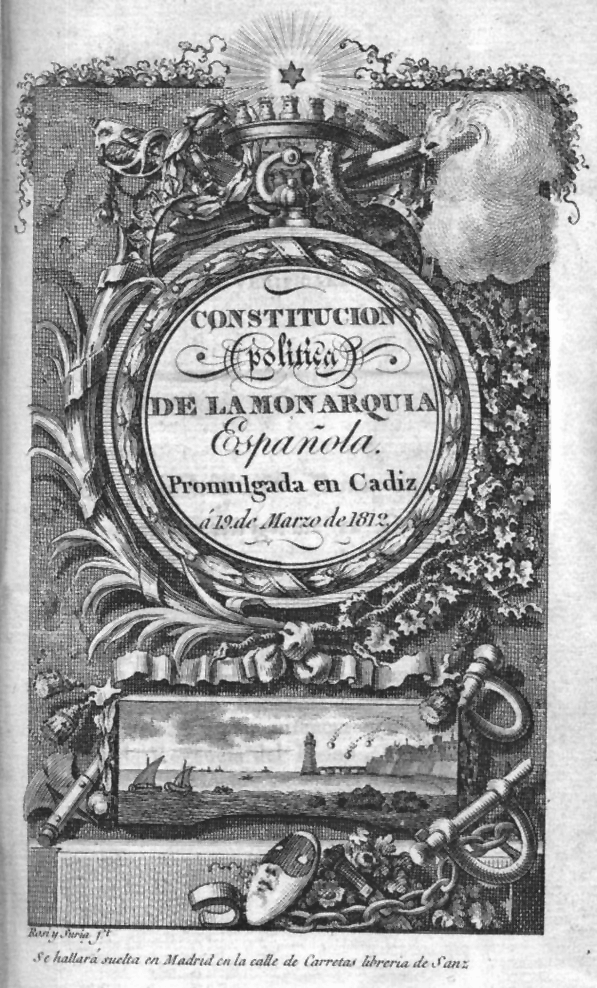
- Original version of the Constitution kept in the Senate of Spain

Cortes of Cádiz
- Long title: Political Constitution of the Spanish Monarchy
- Territorial extent: Spanish Monarchy
- Passed: 19 March 1812
- Enacted: 12 March 1812
- Signed by: President of the Cortes of Cádiz; 174 deputies 4 secretaries
- Effective: 19 March 1812 (first time); 1 January 1820 (second time, de facto); 1836 (third time, de facto)
- Repealed: 4 May 1814 (first time); April 1823 (second time); 18 June 1837 (third time)

The Political Constitution of the Spanish Monarchy (Spanish: Constitución Política de la Monarquía Española), also known as the Constitution of Cádiz (Spanish: Constitución de Cádiz) and nicknamed La Pepa, was the first Constitution of Spain and one of the earliest codified constitutions in world history. The Constitution was ratified on 19 March 1812 by the Cortes of Cádiz, the first Spanish legislature that included delegates from the entire nation and its possessions, including .

The Constitution of Cádiz emerged as a response to the French occupation in a context of rivalry with the Bayonne Statute imposed by Napoleon. With the notable exception of proclaiming Roman Catholicism as the official and sole legal religion in Spain, the Constitution was one of the most liberal of its time: it affirmed national sovereignty, separation of powers, freedom of the press, free enterprise, abolished corporate privileges (fueros), and established a constitutional monarchy with a parliamentary system. It was one of the first constitutions that allowed universal male suffrage, with some exceptions, through a complex indirect electoral system. It extended political rights for representation to Spanish America and the Philippines, a significant step for the demands of overseas-born Spaniards.

When King Ferdinand VII returned to power in 1814, he dissolved the Cortes and abrogated the constitution, re-establishing absolute monarchy. The constitution was reinstated during the Trienio Liberal (1820–1823) and again in 1836–1837 while the Progressives prepared the Constitution of 1837. It was an important model for later constitutions in Spain and Spanish America. However, during the interim, in 1815, a fresh wave of military conflict unfolded as Ferdinand VII dispatched Royalist troops to reclaim control of the Americas. This era is commonly labeled as the restoration or the re-conquest. Reflections on these terms, however, delve into differences between the two. All in all, being pondered whether this period should be viewed as a restoration of Spanish authority or a re-conquest of territories.

== Napoleonic political changes ==
Until the Napoleonic invasion of Spain in 1808, Ferdinand VII ruled as an absolute monarch. Napoleon forced Ferdinand's abdication as well as the renunciation of his father Charles IV's rights, and then placed his brother Joseph Bonaparte on the Spanish throne.

Seeking to create legitimacy for Joseph I of Spain, Napoleon called the Cortes, whose delegates he had selected, to proclaim Joseph as the legitimate monarch. The Cortes then approved the French-style Bayonne Constitution and called for a Cortes with 172 members, of which 62 were to be from Spanish America. There was to be a Council of State with a section for The Indies, the name Spain persisted in using for Spanish America and the Philippines, which would be under the control of American-born and Philippine-born Spaniards. Despite these formal attempts to legitimize the rule of Joseph Bonaparte by gaining consent of the Cortes, it was rejected by Spaniards from the peninsula, as well as Spanish America and the Philippines. It had great importance, since it "set off a process that led to the collapse of the Spanish empire. The Napoleonic regime in Madrid forced two issues: the relative freedom of the colonies to pursue their own affairs, and the rights to representation in imperial assemblies."

== Spanish Cortes of Cádiz ==
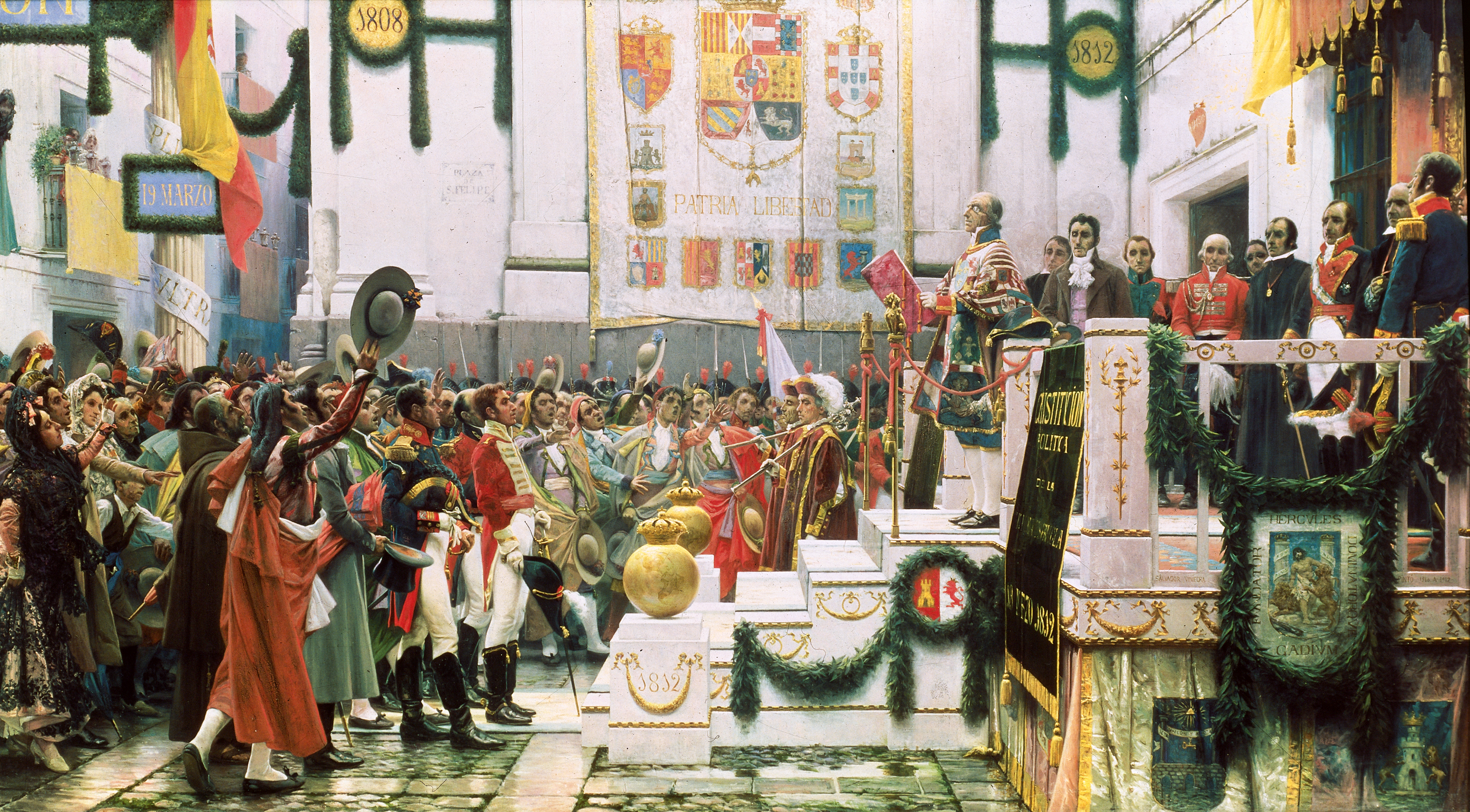
Painting of the constitution's promulgation by Salvador Viniegra

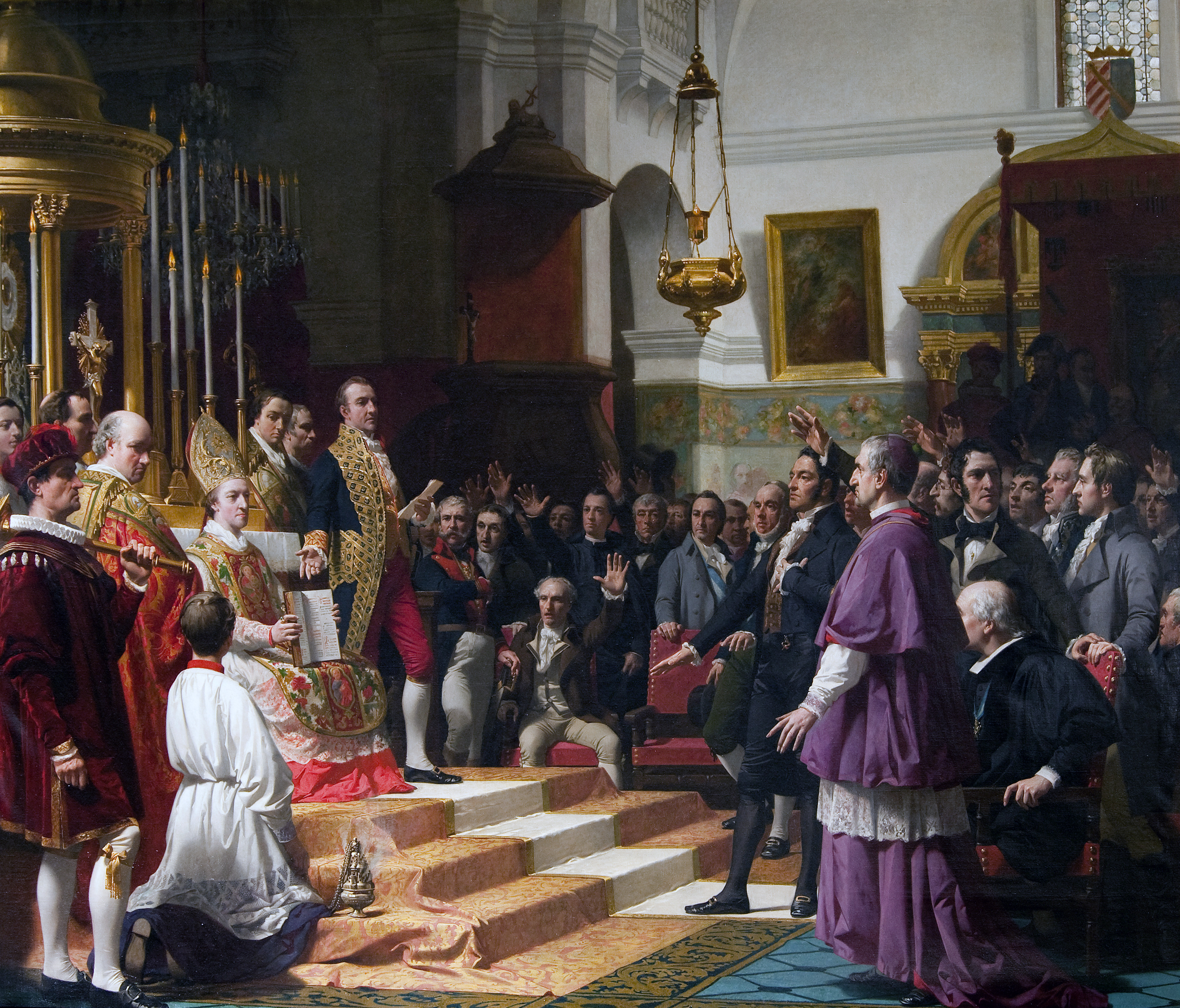
Cortes of Cádiz Oath in 1810. Oil painting by José Casado del Alisal, 1863.

As Spaniards in the peninsula and overseas grappled with the new political reality, for them it created a crisis of legitimacy of rule. Many places in Spain created juntas to rule in place of the legitimate monarch. A Supreme Central Junta was created to coordinate the multiplicity of juntas. Napoleon opened a new way for the Spanish Empire to be constituted. His vision acknowledged the aspirations of Spanish colonies for greater equality and autonomy. Spaniards rejecting Napoleon's rule meant they needed to offer political inducements for Spanish America and the Philippines to stay loyal to the empire. A new Cortes was called with delegates from Spain and overseas components of the Spanish Empire in the Americas and the Philippines. The Spanish organized an interim Spanish government, the Supreme Central Junta, and called for a Cortes to convene with representatives from all Spanish provinces in the empire, in order to establish a government with a firm claim to legitimacy. The Junta first met on 25 September 1808 in Aranjuez and later in Seville, before retreating to Cádiz. Cádiz was the most secure place for the Cortes to take place, since it was a fortified port. Retreating before the advancing French and an outbreak of yellow fever, the Supreme Central Junta moved to Isla de León, where it could be supplied and defended with the help of the Spanish and British navies, and abolished itself, leaving a regency to rule until the Cortes could convene. The Cortes of Cádiz crafted and adopted the Constitution while besieged by French troops, first on Isla de León (now San Fernando), then an island separated from the mainland by a shallow waterway on the Atlantic side of the Bay of Cádiz, and within the small, strategically located city of Cádiz itself.

When the Cortes convened in Cádiz in 1810, there appeared to be two possibilities for Spain's political future if the French could be driven out. The first, represented especially by Gaspar Melchor de Jovellanos, was the restoration of the absolutist Antiguo Régimen ("Old Regime"); the second was to adopt some sort of written constitution.

The Cortes did not have revolutionary intentions, since the Supreme Central Junta saw itself simply as a continuation of the legitimate government of Spain in the absence of a monarch considered legitimate. The opening session of the new Cortes was held on 24 September 1810 in the building now known as the Real Teatro de las Cortes. The opening ceremonies included a civic procession, a Mass, and a call by the President of the Regency, Pedro Quevedo y Quintana, the Bishop of Ourense, for those present to fulfill their task loyally and efficiently. Still, the very act of resistance to the French involved a certain degree of deviation from the doctrine of royal sovereignty: if sovereignty resided entirely in the monarch, then Charles and Ferdinand's abdications in favor of Napoleon would have made Joseph Bonaparte the legitimate ruler of Spain.

The representatives who gathered at Cádiz were far more liberal than the elite of Spain as a whole, and they produced a document far more liberal than might have been produced in Spain were it not for the war. Few of the most conservative voices were at Cádiz, and there was no effective communication with King Ferdinand, who was a virtual prisoner in France. In the Cortes of 1810–1812, the majority were liberal deputies with the implicit support of the British protecting the city, while representatives of the Church and nobility constituted a minority. Liberals wanted equality before the law, a centralized government, an efficient modern civil service, a reform of the tax system, the replacement of feudal privileges by freedom of contract, and the recognition of the property owner's right to use his property as he saw fit. Three basic principles were soon ratified by the Cortes: that sovereignty resides in the nation, the legitimacy of Ferdinand VII as King of Spain, and the inviolability of the deputies. With this, the first steps towards a political revolution were taken, since prior to the Napoleonic intervention, Spain had been ruled as an absolute monarchy by the Bourbons and their Hapsburg predecessors. Although the Cortes was not unanimous in its liberalism, the new Constitution significantly reduced the power of the Crown and the Catholic Church (although Catholicism remained the state religion).

== Terms ==
Spanish Nation map according to the Constitution of 1812.

As the principal aim of the new constitution was the prevention of arbitrary and corrupt royal rule, it provided for a limited monarchy, which governed through ministers subject to parliamentary control. It laid out the structure of the three branches of government: executive, legislative and judicial.

The constitution has 384 articles in 10 major chapters (or Títulos). Chapter I was Of the Spanish Nation and Spaniards (articles 1–9). Chapter II (articles 12–26) was Of the Spanish Territory, Religion, Government and Rights of Citizenship. Chapter III (articles 27–167) dealt with the Cortes, the legislative branch of government. Chapter IV Of the King (articles 168–241) defined the powers of and the restrictions on the monarchy. Chapter V Of the Tribunals, and Administration of Civil and Criminal Justice (articles 242–308) concerned how laws would be administered by specific courts. Chapter VI Of the Internal Government of Provinces and of the Pueblos (articles 309–323) lays out governance at the provincial and local level. Chapter VII Of the Financial Contributions (articles 338–355) dealt with taxation. Chapter VIII Of the National Military Force (articles 356–365) specified how the military would operate. Chapter IX Of Public Education (articles 366–371) called for uniform public education from primary schools through university, as well as freedom of expression (article 371). Chapter X Of the Observance of the Constitution and the Way to Proceed to Amend it (articles 366–384). The constitution had no bill of rights, which had been the case of the Constitution of the United States when it was first ratified. Rights and obligations of citizens were embedded in individual articles of the Spanish Constitution.

Male suffrage, which was not determined by property qualifications, favoured the position of the commercial class in the new parliament since there was no special provision for the Church or the nobility. Repeal of traditional property restrictions gave liberals the freer economy that they wanted. There was no provision for literacy of voters until 1830, which allowed men in the popular groups access to suffrage. The constitution set up a centralized administrative system for the whole empire, in both Iberia and overseas components, based on newly-reformed and uniform provincial governments and municipalities, rather than maintaining some form of the varied historical local governmental structures.

The first provincial government created under the Constitution was in the province of Guadalajara con Molina. Its deputation first met in the village of Anguita in April 1813, since the capital Guadalajara was the site of ongoing fighting.

=== Establishment of Spanish citizenship ===
Among the most debated questions during the drafting of the constitution was the status of the native and mixed-race populations in Spain's possessions around the world. Most of the overseas provinces were represented, especially the most populous regions. Both the Viceroyalty of New Spain and the Viceroyalty of Peru had deputies present, as did Central America, the islands of the Spanish Caribbean, Florida, Chile, Upper Peru and the Philippines. The total number of representatives was 303, of which 37 were born in overseas territories although several of them were temporary substitute deputies [suplentes] elected by American refugees in the city of Cádiz: seven from New Spain, two from Central America, five from Peru, two from Chile, three from the Río de la Plata, three from New Granada, and three from Venezuela, one from Santo Domingo, two from Cuba, one from Puerto Rico and two from the Philippines. Although most of the overseas representatives were Criollos, the majority wanted to extend suffrage to all indigenous, mixed-race and free black people of the Spanish Empire, which would have granted the overseas territories a majority in the future Cortes. The majority of representatives from peninsular Spain opposed those proposals as they wished to limit the weight of non-peninsulares. According to the best estimates of the time, continental Spain had an estimated population of between 10 and 11 million, and the overseas provinces had a combined population of around 15 to 16 million. The Cortes ultimately approved a distinction between nationality and citizenship (that is, those with the right to vote).

The Constitution gave Spanish citizenship to natives of the territories that had belonged to the Spanish monarchy in both hemispheres. The Constitution of 1812 included Indigenous peoples of the Americas to Spanish citizenship, but the acquisition of citizenship for any casta of Afro-American peoples of the Americas was through naturalization excluding slaves. Spanish nationals were defined as all people born, naturalized or permanently residing for more than ten years in Spanish territories. Article 1 of the Constitution read: "The Spanish nation is the collectivity of the Spaniards of both hemispheres." Voting rights were granted to Spanish nationals whose ancestry originated from Spain or the territories of the Spanish Empire. That changed the legal status of the people not only in Peninsular Spain but also in Spanish possessions overseas. In the latter case, not only people of Spanish ancestry but also indigenous peoples as well were transformed from the subjects of an absolute monarch to the citizens of a nation rooted in the doctrine of national, rather than royal, sovereignty. At the same time, the Constitution recognized the civil rights of free blacks and mulatos but explicitly denied them automatic citizenship. Furthermore, they were not to be counted for the purposes of establishing the number of representatives a given province was to send to the Cortes. That removed an estimated six million people from the rolls in the overseas territories. In part, that arrangement was a strategy by the peninsular deputies to achieve equality in the number of American and peninsular deputies in the future Cortes, but it also served the interests of conservative Criollo representatives, who wished to keep political power within a limited group of people.

The peninsular deputies, for the most part, were also not inclined towards ideas of federalism promoted by many of the overseas deputies, which would have granted greater self-rule to the American and Asian territories. Most of the peninsulares, therefore, shared the absolutists' inclination towards centralized government. Another aspect of the treatment of the overseas territories in the constitution, one of the many that would prove not to be to the taste of Ferdinand VII, that by converting the territories to provinces, the king was deprived of a great economic resource. Under the Antiguo Régimen, the taxes from Spain's overseas possessions went directly to the royal treasury. Under the Constitution of 1812, it would go to the state administrative apparatus.

=== Ayuntamientos ===
The impact of the 1812 Constitution on the emerging states of Spanish America was quite direct. Miguel Ramos Arizpe of Mexico, Joaquín Fernández de Leiva of Chile, Vicente Morales Duárez of Peru and José Mejía Lequerica of Ecuador, among other significant figures in founding Spanish American republics, were active participants at Cádiz. One provision of the Constitution (article 310) provided for the creation of a local government (an ayuntamiento) for every settlement of over 1,000 people. The provision was designed to transform the institution from one controlled by elites to representative institutions through elections. Elections were indirect, favouring the wealthy and socially prominent. The proposal came from Ramos Arizpe. That benefited the bourgeoisie at the expense of the hereditary aristocracy both on the Peninsula and in the Americas, where it was particularly to the advantage of the Criollos since they came to dominate the ayuntamientos. In Cuzco, the local elites welcomed the opportunity to participate in governance on the ayuntamiento. They distributed copies of the Constitution, allied with the provincial deputation and the cathedral chapter, all dominated by creoles, to oppose peninsular-born bureaucrats. The Constitution also brought in a certain measure of federalism through the back door, both on the peninsula and overseas: elected bodies at the local and provincial level might not always be in lockstep with the central government.

== Promulgation ==
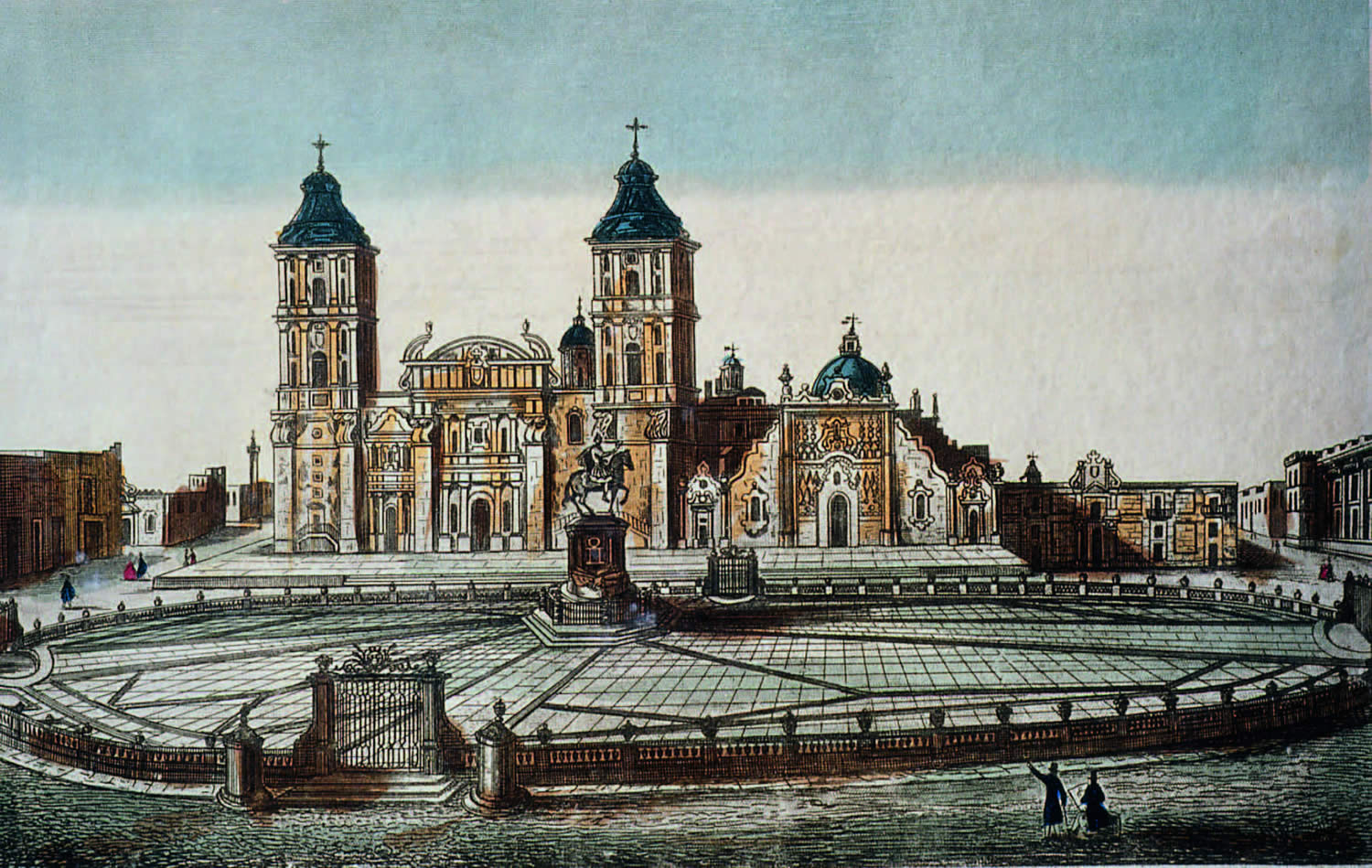
Lithograph of Mexico City's Zócalo, c. 1800. The square is officially known as the Plaza de la Constitución. Named during the tail-end of the colonial era for the Cadiz Constitution, not the later Constitution of Mexico.

The Constitution was signed in March 1812, but it was not promulgated immediately throughout the empire. In New Spain, Viceroy Francisco Javier Venegas allowed the Constitution to be published on 19 September 1812. In Peru, the other major viceroyalty, Viceroy José Fernando Abascal had the Constitution published on 1 October 1812. Venegas had to deal immediately upon taking up his post as viceroy the massive uprising of Father Miguel Hidalgo y Costilla that had broken out days earlier. The inexperienced Venegas scrambled to handle two major simultaneous crises of power: a rebellion and the promulgation of a new system of government under the Constitution. Abascal was able to control the electoral process and control of the press (article 371) despite the provisions of the Constitution mandating its freedom. The constitution was not promulgated in Quito until 18 July 1813.

== Repeal and restoration ==
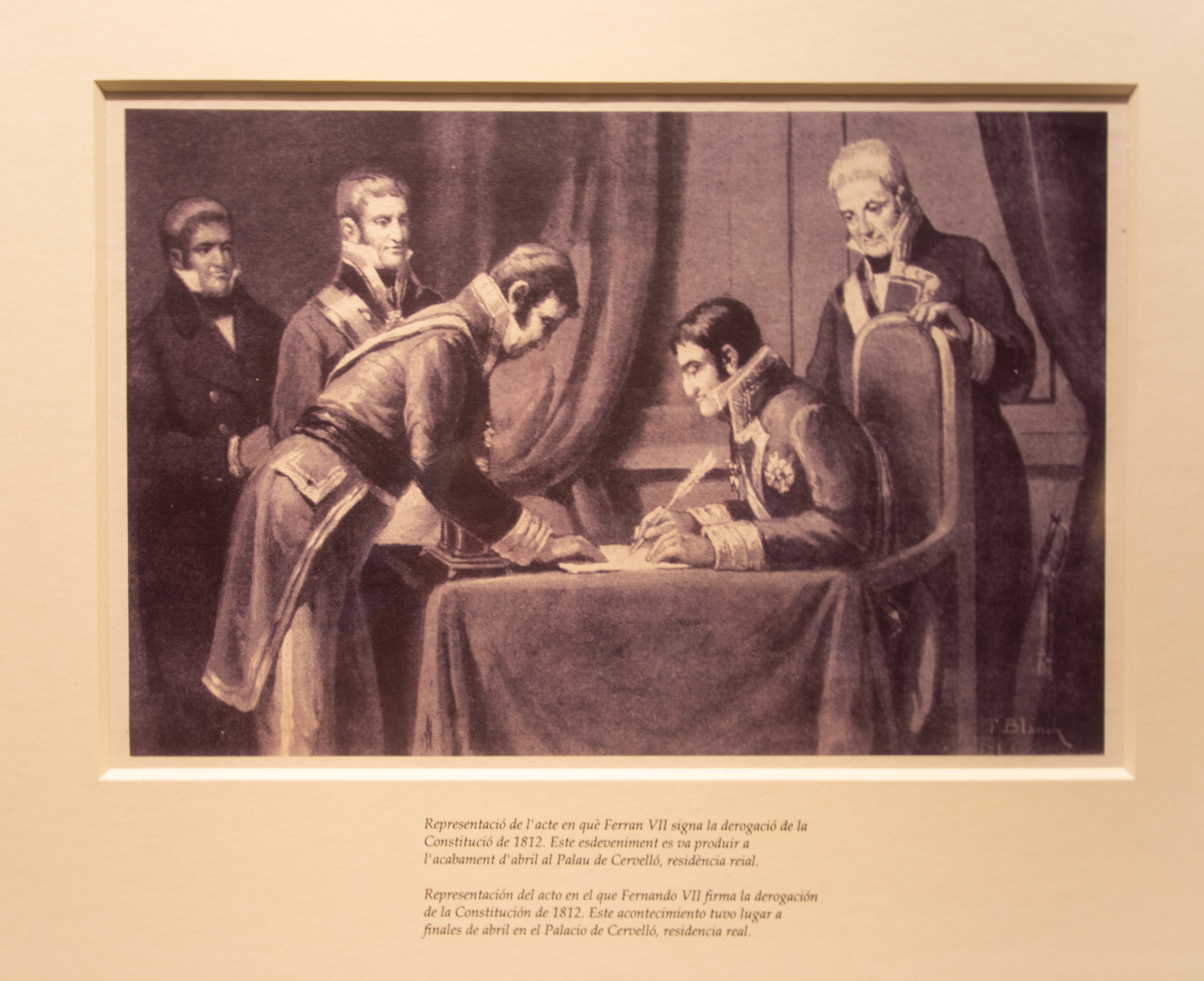
Repeal of the Constitution of 1812 by Fernando VII in the palace of Cervellón, Valencia, Spain.

When Ferdinand VII was restored in March 1814 by the Allied Powers, it is not clear whether he immediately made up his mind as to whether to accept or reject this new charter of Spanish government. He first promised to uphold the constitution, but was repeatedly met in numerous towns by crowds who welcomed him as an absolute monarch, often smashing the markers that had renamed their central plazas as Plaza of the Constitution. Sixty-nine deputies of the Cortes signed the so-called Manifiesto de los Persas ("Manifesto of the Persians") encouraging him to restore absolutism. Within a matter of weeks, encouraged by conservatives and backed by the Roman Catholic Church hierarchy, he abolished the constitution on 4 May and arrested many liberal leaders on 10 May, justifying his actions as the repudiation of an unlawful constitution made by a Cortes assembled in his absence and without his consent. Thus he came back to assert the Bourbon doctrine that the sovereign authority resided in his person only.

Ferdinand's absolutist rule rewarded the traditional holders of power—prelates, nobles and those who held office before 1808—but not liberals, who wished to see a constitutional monarchy in Spain, or many who led the war effort against the French but had not been part of the pre-war government. This discontent resulted in several unsuccessful attempts to restore the Constitution in the five years after Ferdinand's restoration. Finally on 1 January 1820 Rafael del Riego, Antonio Quiroga and other officers initiated a mutiny of army officers in Andalusia demanding the implementation of the Constitution. The movement found support among the northern cities and provinces of Spain, and by 7 March the king had restored the Constitution. Over the next two years, the other European monarchies became alarmed at the liberals' success and at the Congress of Verona in 1822 approved the intervention of royalist French forces in Spain to support Ferdinand VII. After the Battle of Trocadero liberated Ferdinand from control by the Cortes in August 1823, he turned on the liberals and constitutionalists with fury. After Ferdinand's death in 1833, the Constitution was in force again briefly in 1836 and 1837, while the Constitution of 1837 was being drafted. Since 1812, Spain has had a total of seven constitutions; the current one has been in force since 1978.

== Legacy ==
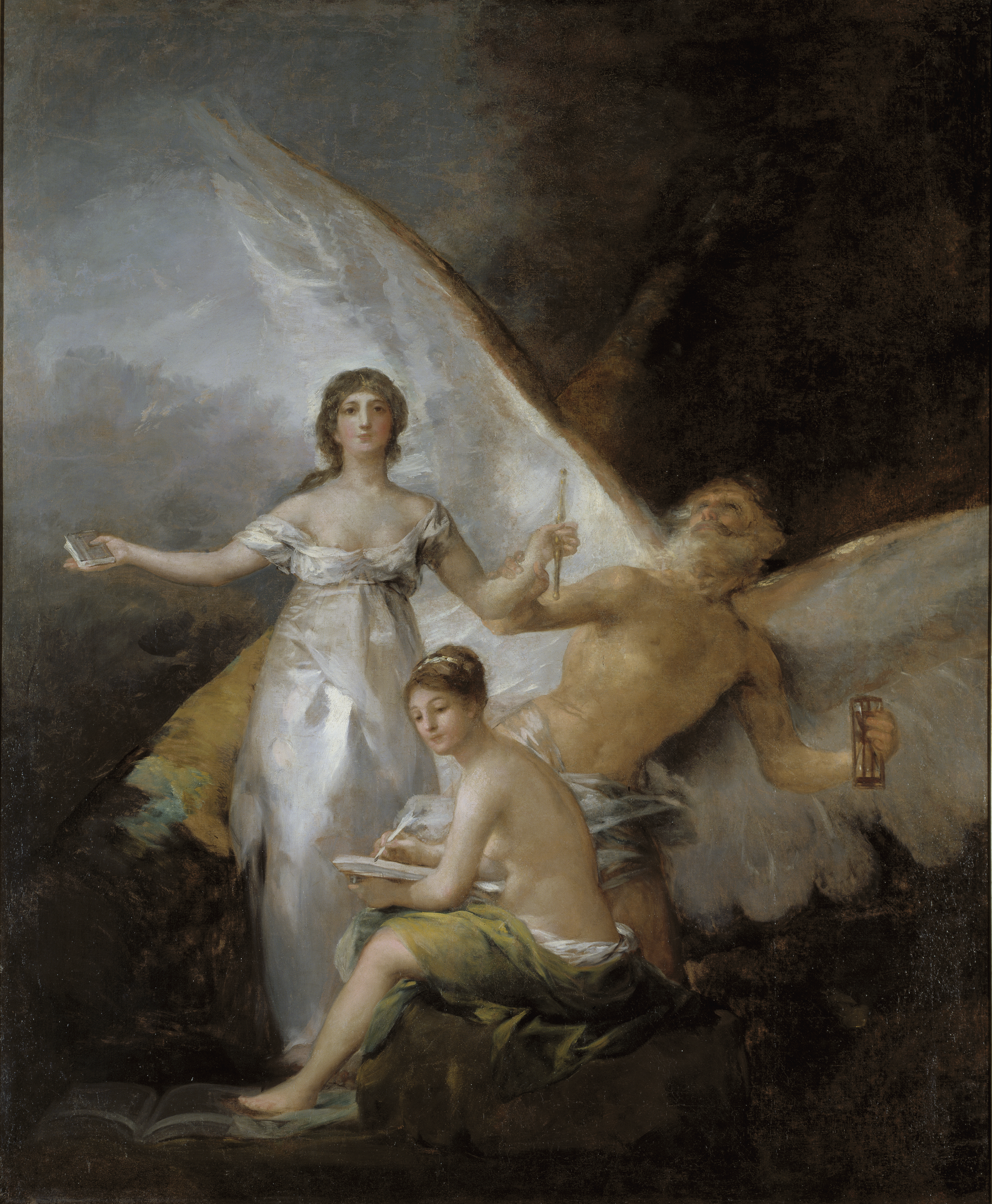
Allegory of the Constitution of 1812, Francisco de Goya, Swedish National Museum.

The Cortes of Cádiz produced the first written Spanish constitution, promulgated in Cádiz on 19 March 1812, and is regarded as the founding document of liberalism in Spain. It is one of the first examples of classical liberalism or conservative liberalism worldwide. It came to be called the "sacred code" of the branch of liberalism that rejected a part of the French Revolution. During the early nineteenth century it served as a model for liberal constitutions of several Mediterranean and Latin American nations. It served as the model for the Norwegian Constitution of 1814, the Portuguese Constitution of 1822 and the Mexican one of 1824, and was implemented with minor modifications in various Italian states by the Carbonari during their revolt of 1820 and 1821. The Plan de Iguala in Mexico in 1821 was a reaction to the Cadiz Constitution. Agustín de Iturbide did not like how the Spanish government was becoming more liberal; instead he wanted things to go back to the way they were. The Plan de Iguala increases the power of the Roman Catholic Church instead of decreasing it, and also called on the prince of Spain to come and rule over them.

== Gallery ==
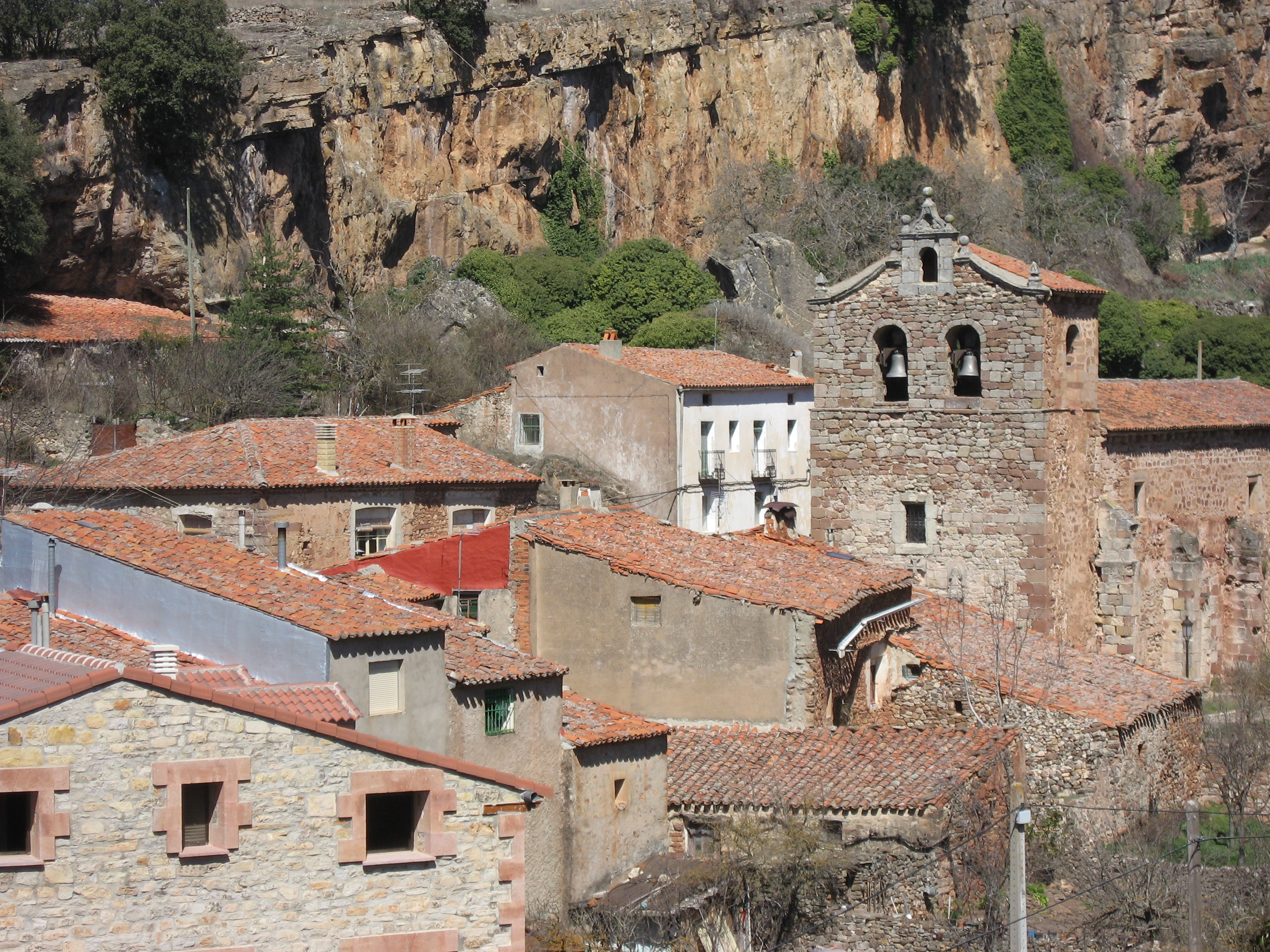
Anguita, where the act was signed to establish the first diputación provincial under the 1812 Constitution.

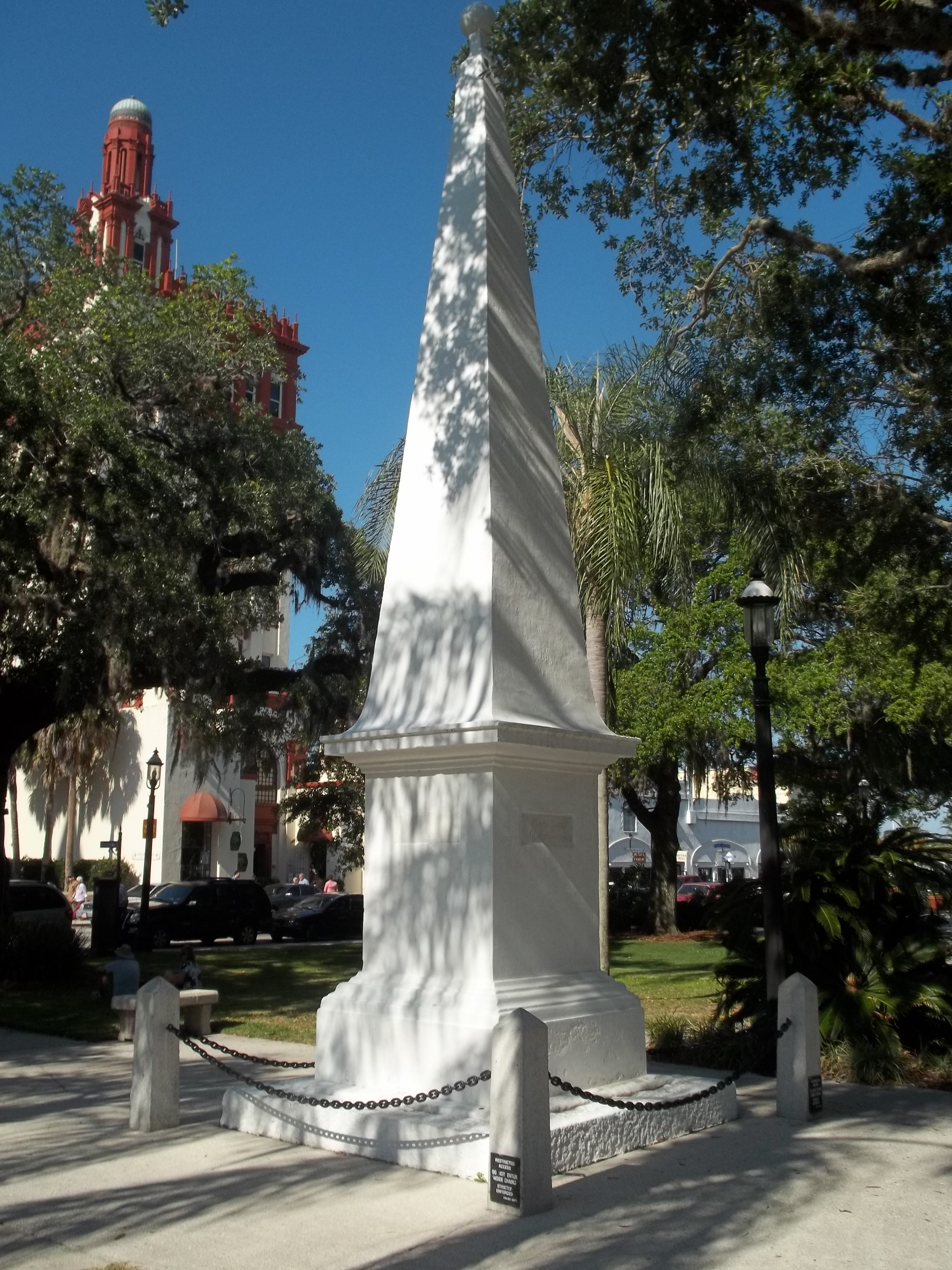
Constitution of 1812 monument in St. Augustine, Florida. This obelisk was erected when the city was the capital of the Spanish Florida.

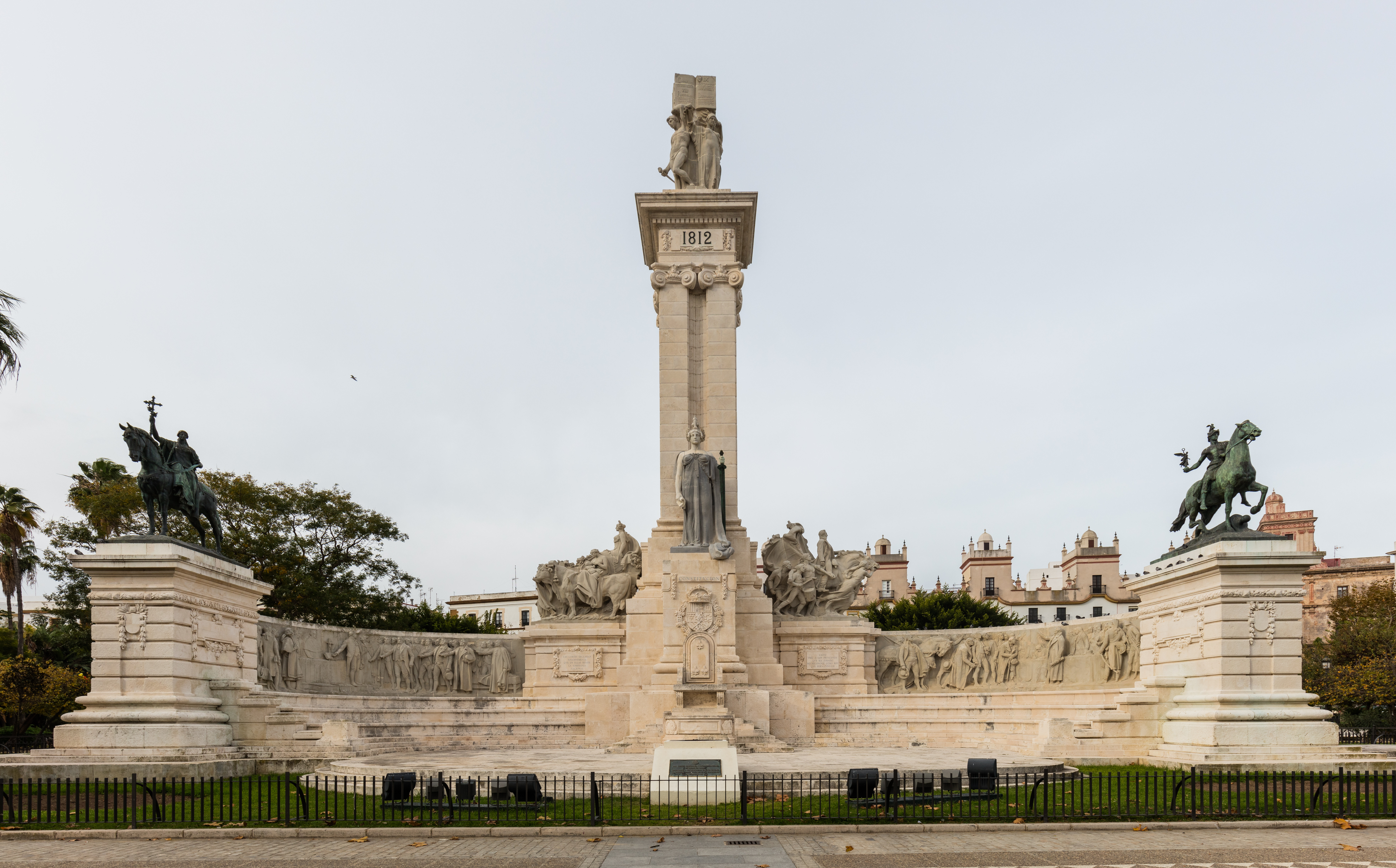
Monument to the Constitution of 1812 in Cádiz, Spain

== See also ==
- American Provincial Deputation of Spain
- Bayonne Constitution
- Cádiz
- Cortes of Cádiz
- Dos de Mayo Uprising
- History of democracy in Mexico
- List of constitutions of Spain
- Napoleonic Code
- Retroversion of the sovereignty to the people
- San Fernando, Cádiz
- Spanish American wars of independence
- Trienio Liberal

== Primary sources ==
- The Political Constitution of the Spanish Monarchy. Biblioteca Virtual "Miguel de Cervantes" on-line version of a partial translation originally published in Cobbett's Political Register, Vol. 16 (July–December 1814).
