= Cortes of Cádiz =

1810–1814 revival of the traditional Spanish parliament (cortes)

Cortes de Cádiz Cortes Generales y Extraordinarias del Reino Cortes of Cádiz
- Royal Coat of Arms of the Kingdom

- Kingdom of Spain and the Indies (the Spains)

Type
- Type: Constituent assembly
- Chambers: Unicameralism

History
- Founded: September 24, 1810
- Disbanded: May 4, 1814
- Preceded by: Supreme Central Junta of the Kingdom
- Succeeded by: Absolutism under Ferdinand VII
- New session started: Trienio Liberal
- Seats: theoretical total: 240 deputies; Attended the first session: 102–104 full deputies and 46–47 substitute deputies; Signed the Constitution: 185 deputies

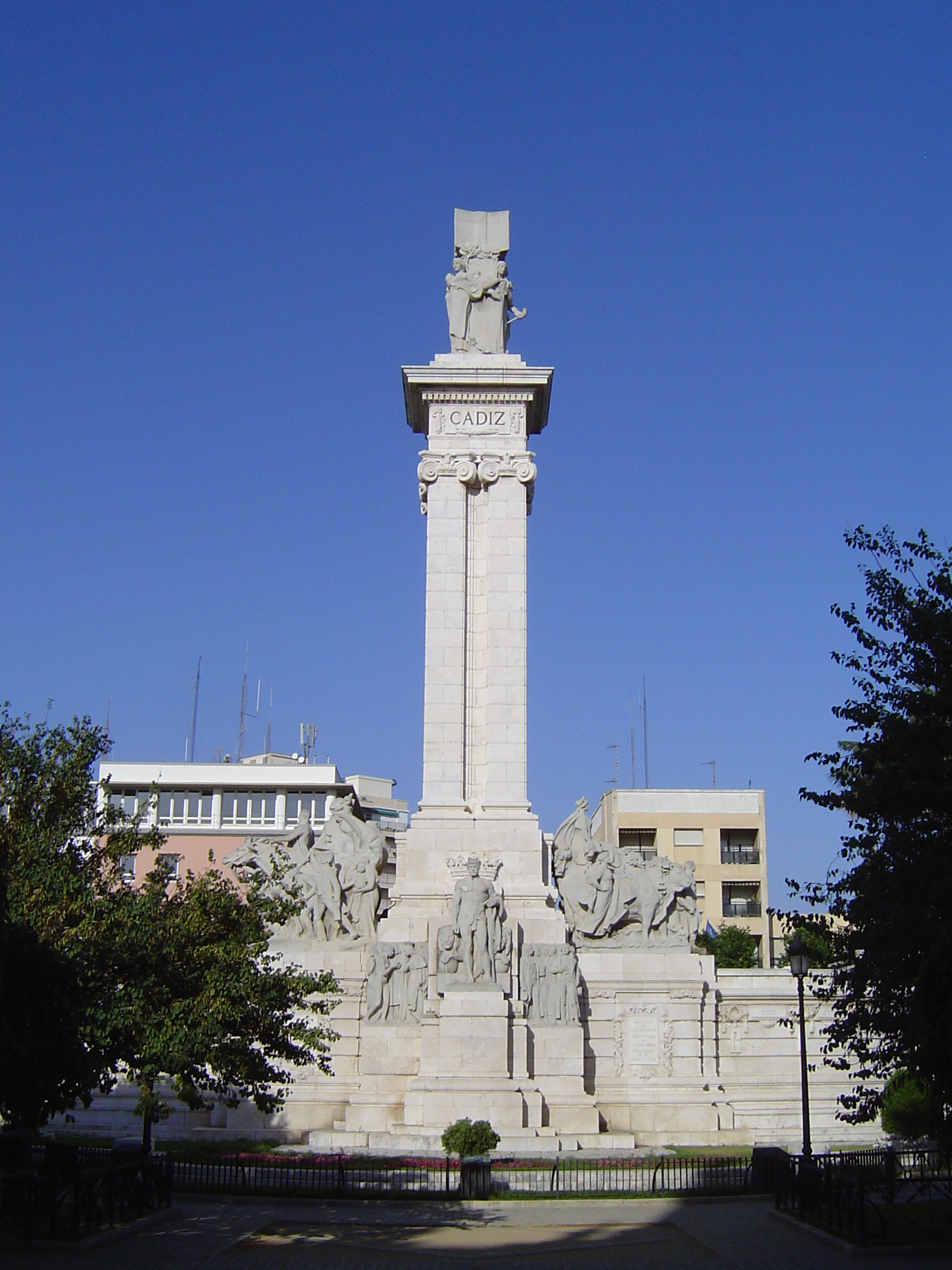
Monument in Cádiz to the Cortes and the 1812 constitution

The Cortes of Cádiz, officially the General and Extraordinary Cortes of the Kingdom, were the result of the Spanish liberal revolution that transformed the Bourbon Kingdom of Spain and the Indies from an absolutist state into a national state, through the formation of a national parliament, cortes (Spanish parliament). It met as a single body, rather than divided into estates as with traditional cortes.

The General and Extraordinary Cortes that met in the port of Cádiz starting 24 September 1810 "claimed legitimacy as the sole representative of Spanish sovereignty", following the French invasion and occupation of Spain during the Napoleonic Wars and the abdication of the monarch Ferdinand VII and his father Charles IV. It met as one body, and its members represented the entire Spanish Empire, that is, not only Spain but also Spanish America and the Philippines.

The Cortes of Cádiz was seen then, and by historians today, as a major step towards liberalism and democracy in the history of Spain and Spanish America. The liberal Cortes drafted and ratified the Spanish Constitution of 1812, which established a constitutional monarchy and eliminated many institutions that privileged some groups over others.

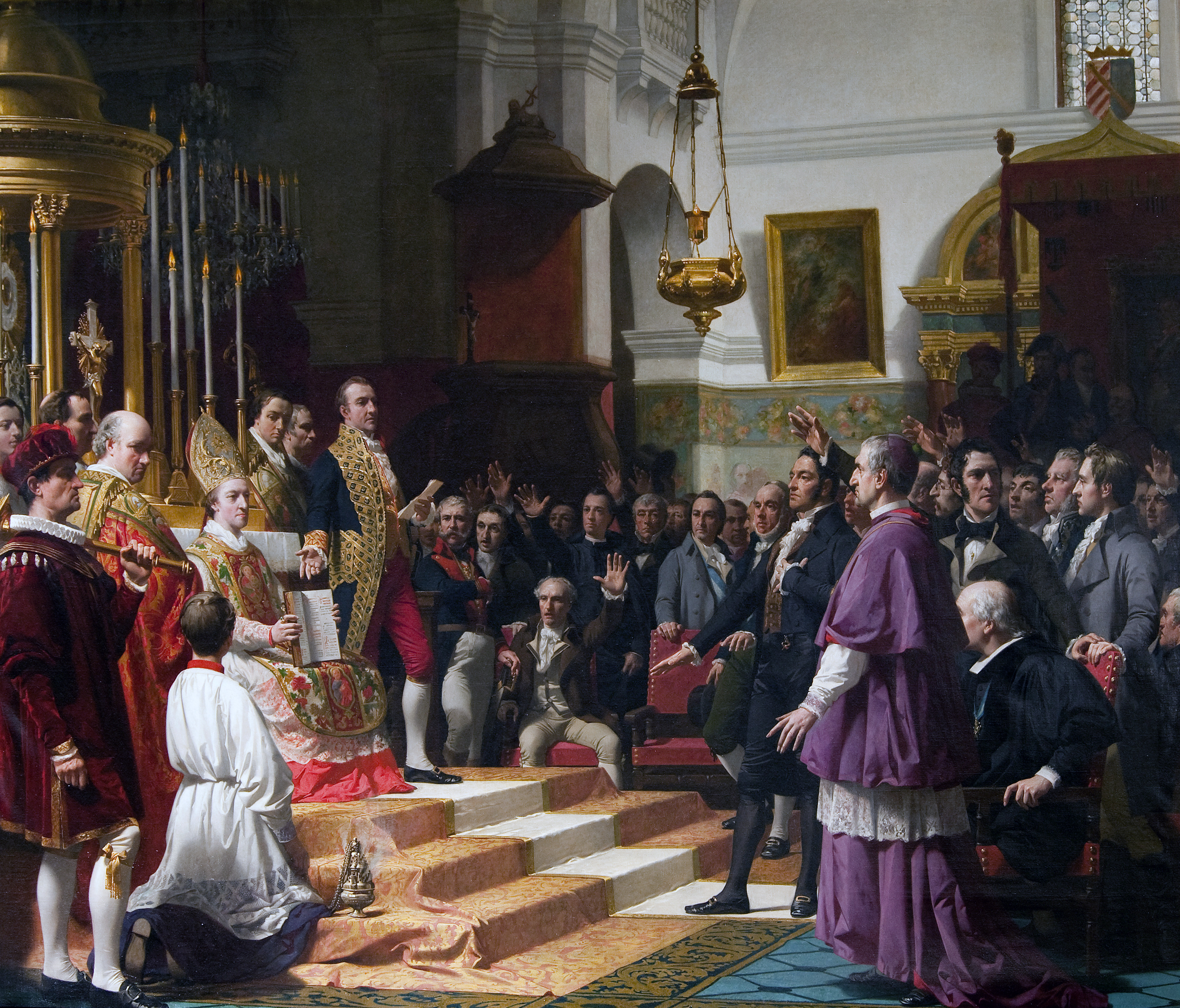
Oath of the Cortes of Cádiz in the main parish church of San Fernando, the work of José Casado del Alisal. Presented at the Congress of Deputies in Madrid

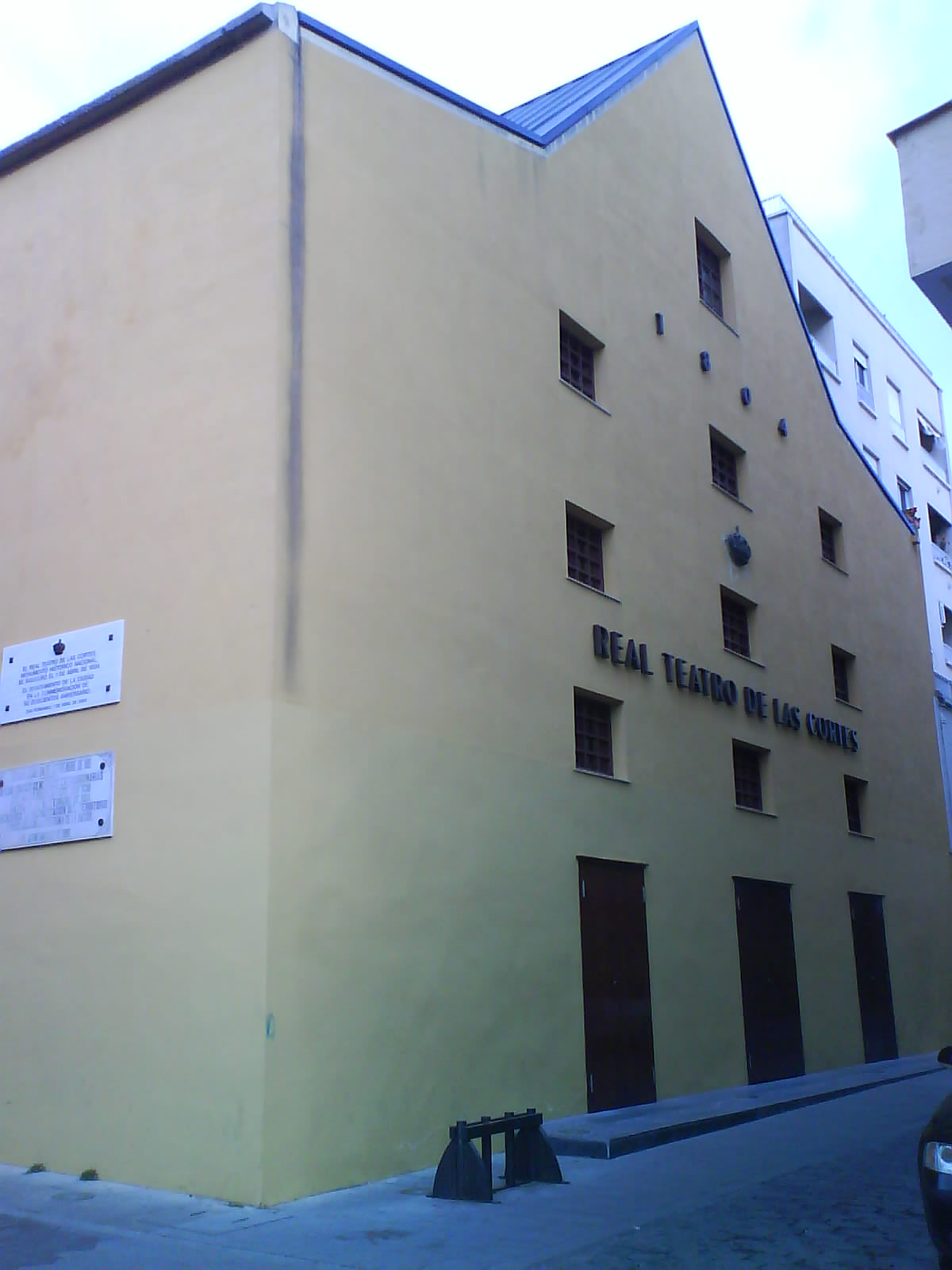
Real Teatro de las Cortes, where the deputies who drafted the Spanish Constitution of 1812 met between 24 September 1810, and 20 February 1811.

== Background ==
The French Imperial Army (1804–1815) invaded Portugal (1807) and then Spain (1808), upending the Bourbon monarchy. At the time of the invasion, Charles IV had been at serious odds with his son and heir Ferdinand VII. In March 1808, the Tumult of Aranjuez, first forced Charles IV's first minister Manuel Godoy to be sacked; and then Charles IV himself was forced to abdicate under pressure. French armies were occupying Portugal and Spain, with some 50,000 in the capital Madrid, so that whoever was on the throne of Spain, the monarch had to contend with French troops. Napoleon saw the opportunity to bring down the dysfunctional and weak Bourbon monarchy by pitting father and son against each other further, to his own advantage. He invited Ferdinand VII to Bayonne, France, where Ferdinand thought that Napoleon was going to affirm him as Spain's legitimate ruler. His father Charles and mother María Luisa were also separately called to Bayonne.

After the Dos de Mayo Uprising (2 May) 1808, Napoleon forced Ferdinand to abdicate the throne in favor of his father, who had abdicated under pressure. Because Charles hated his son so much that he did not want him to be his heir, he then abdicated in favor of Napoleon himself. Napoleon turned over the throne of Spain to his older brother Joseph Napoleon, who was crowned in July 1808. Napoleon thought that a reformist regime would be welcomed by the Spanish people, but they chose loyalty to Ferdinand VII. In order to further shore up French dominance and implement structural changes, Napoleon brought together as many aristocrats as possible to Bayonne, where they ratified "the first written constitution of the Spanish-speaking world." This document is variously called the Bayonne Statute and the Bayonne Constitution. It abolished privileges fueros, the inquisition, and preserved the Cortes. Catholicism was kept as the sole religion. It is said that all but a few pro-French Spaniards (afrancesados) rejected this document.

From the first days of the Peninsular War, which erupted in Spain; in resistance to the French invasion and occupation of the peninsula, local ruling bodies or juntas appeared as the underground opposition to the French-imposed government. They were established by army commanders, guerrilla leaders or local civilian groups. Convinced that unity was needed to co-ordinate efforts against the French and to deal with British aid, several provincial juntas, in Murcia, Valencia, Seville and Castile and León, called for the formation of a central body. After a series of negotiations that included the discredited Council of Castile, a Supreme Central Junta met in Aranjuez on 25 September 1808. Serving as surrogate for the absent royal government, it called for representatives from local provinces and overseas territories to meet in an "Extraordinary and General Cortes of the Spanish Nation." It was so called because it would be both the legislative body for the empire and the body that would write a constitution for it. By the beginning of 1810, the forces under the Junta's command had suffered serious military reverses at the battles of Ocaña and Alba de Tormes. The French inflicted large losses on the Spanish, took control of southern Spain and forced the government to retreat to Cádiz, its last available redoubt on Spanish soil.

== Convoking the Cortes ==
Deputies of Cádiz Cortes by territories

The Supreme Central Junta dissolved itself on 29 January 1810 and set up a five-person Regency, charged with convening the Cortes. The Regency drew up a list of American-born Spaniards already present in Spain. By the time the delegates were to be chosen, some of Spain's American territories had successfully established their own juntas. These did not recognize the authority of either the central junta or the regency and so did not send representatives although many other regions in America did. The Regency made the decision to have the Americans elect representatives from their regions to attend the Cortes. Since part of Spanish America was in open revolt, this question of representatives from those regions was fraught. It was argued that the process was illegal, but the Regency decided it was better to have some American representation than none at all. The Regency set electoral procedures for delegates and the number of seats from each region. There were to be 30 representatives from Spanish America: 15 from northern Spanish America plus the Philippines (which was under the administrative jurisdiction of New Spain). New Spain was allocated 7 suplentes: Guatemala, 2; Cuba, 2; the Philippines, 2; Santo Domingo and Puerto Rico, 1; Spanish South America got 15: Peru, 5; Santa Fé, 3; Buenos Aires, 3; Venezuela, 2; and Chile, 2. Those eligible to serve were to be at least 25 years old and from the place they would represent. Not made explicit was that only males were eligible to serve.

When the Cortes convened for the first time on 24 September 1810, 104 deputies were present, 30 representing overseas territories (interim delegates who were living in Spain at the time of the French invasion). Only one of the 36 American deputies arrived in time for the opening session, Ramón Power y Giralt. Eventually, about 300 deputies, including 63 from the Spanish America, participated. The composition of the Cortes of Cádiz was diverse, with about one-third clerical, one-sixth nobles and the remainder from the "third estate", the middle class. Historians of Mexico have investigated many aspects of New Spain's representation at the Cortes. Among the most prominent delegates at the Cortes were José María Couto, who served as vice president in April 1813; José María Gutiérrez de Terán, who served as secretary, vice president, and president at various points; and Miguel Ramos Arizpe.

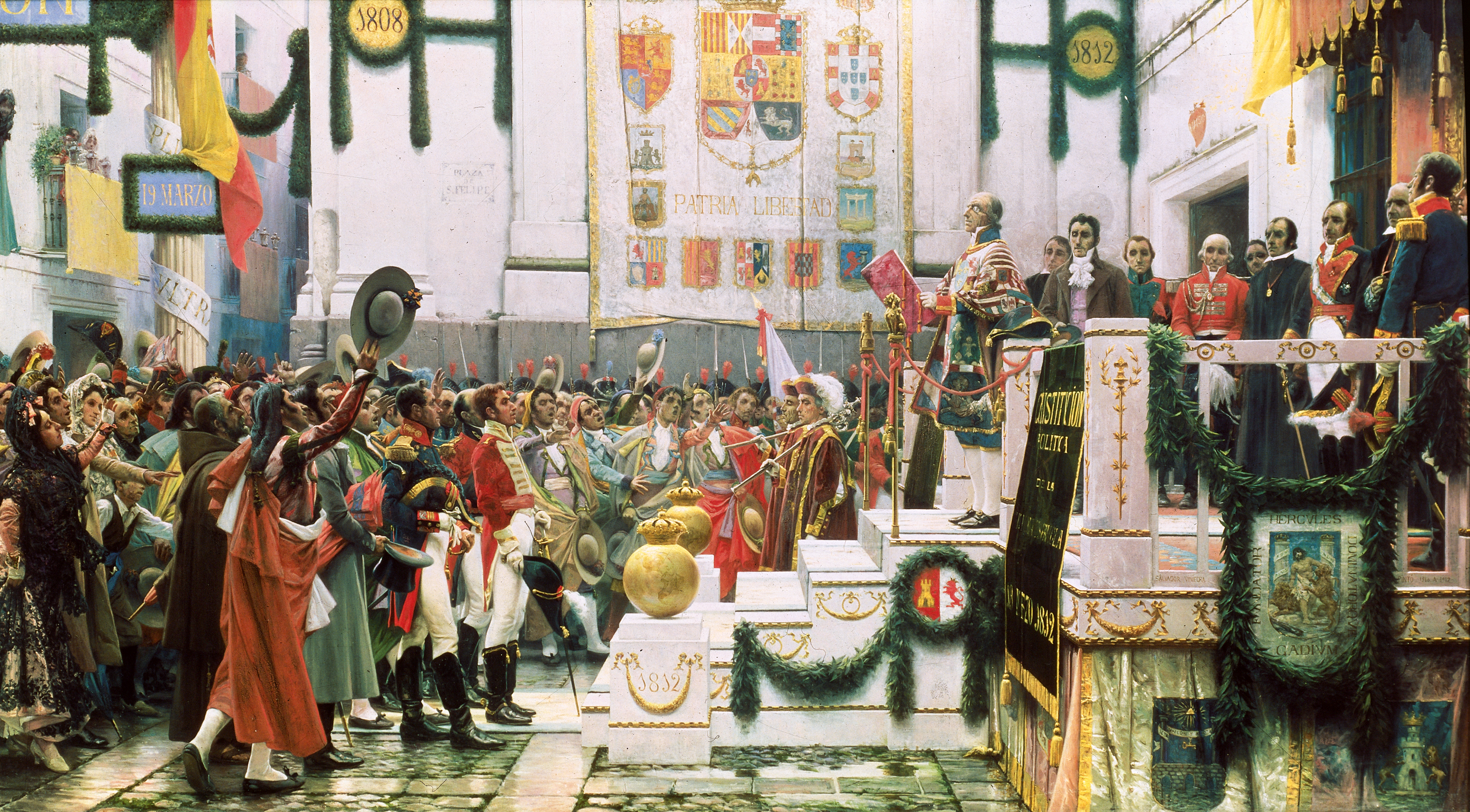
The declaration of the Constitution of 1812, the work of Salvador Viniegra (Museo de las Cortes de Cádiz)

== Influences on the Cortes ==
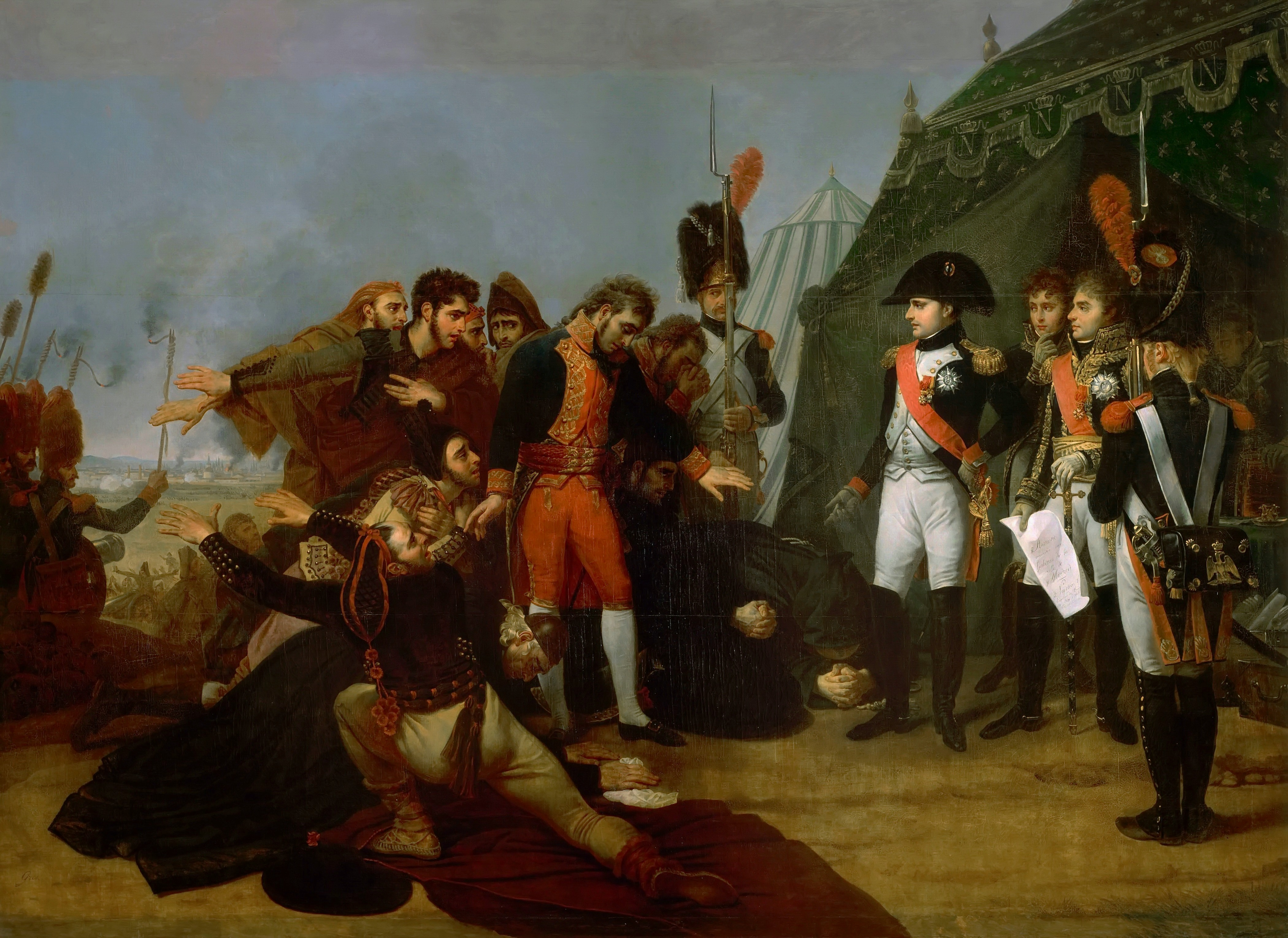
Napoleon Bonaparte accepts the surrender of Madrid (December 1808).

The fact that the Cortes was located in Cádiz, the most important port for trade with the Americas, meant that the powerful merchant guild (consulado) of Cádiz influenced discussions in the Cortes. The consulado attempted to maintain their trade advantages. The Americans wanted freer trade, but the Cortes's location gave the large merchant houses power. In Cádiz, pressures grew to send Spanish troops to quell rebellions in Spanish America, which alarmed Great Britain, now Cádiz's ally against the French in the Peninsular War. Britain ordinarily would have been for the opening up of trade in Spanish America, but during the Peninsular conflict, it wanted as many troops as possible in Spain to defeat the French. Britain rejected pressure to support Spain's attempt to repress rebellion in Spanish America.

Gaspar Melchor de Jovellanos, who had served as Charles IV's minister of justice but had been sidelined by Manuel Godoy, argued for the convocation of a general Cortes. Jovellanos sought precedents in Spanish history for earlier forms of constitutionalism and found them in the Visigoths. Jovellanos rejected the notion that the Cortes could fundamentally change "the essence of our ancient constitution," and was concerned that sweeping changes would open Spain to the dangers of democracy and despotism. However, he did argue for the independence of the executive, the judiciary, and the legislature, but also argued for a bicameral legislature that would have an upper house reserved for the aristocracy. He advocated voting rights based on "qualities of property, rank, and education," to limit democracy.

Seville-born Joseph Blanco White had aided Jovellanos in his research into the precedents for Spanish constitutionalism. But his influence on Spanish America's view of the Cortes was considerable, since he had founded a review in London called El Español (1810–1814), which was backed by the British Foreign Office and distributed by British firms with trade in Spanish America. It became highly influential in Spanish America. The aim of the publication was to "assist the Cortes frame a moderate constitution, and, more important, to effect reconciliation between the insurgent juntas in America and Spain." He was deeply sympathetic to the Americans, publishing letters from Mexican elite Fray Servando Teresa de Mier and Buenos Aires creole patriot, Mariano Moreno, who had called for the opening of trade that would destroy the Spanish monopoly. Blanco White's El Español was denounced by one delegate to the Cortes as "an enemy of his country worse than Napoleon."

== Reforms and constitution ==
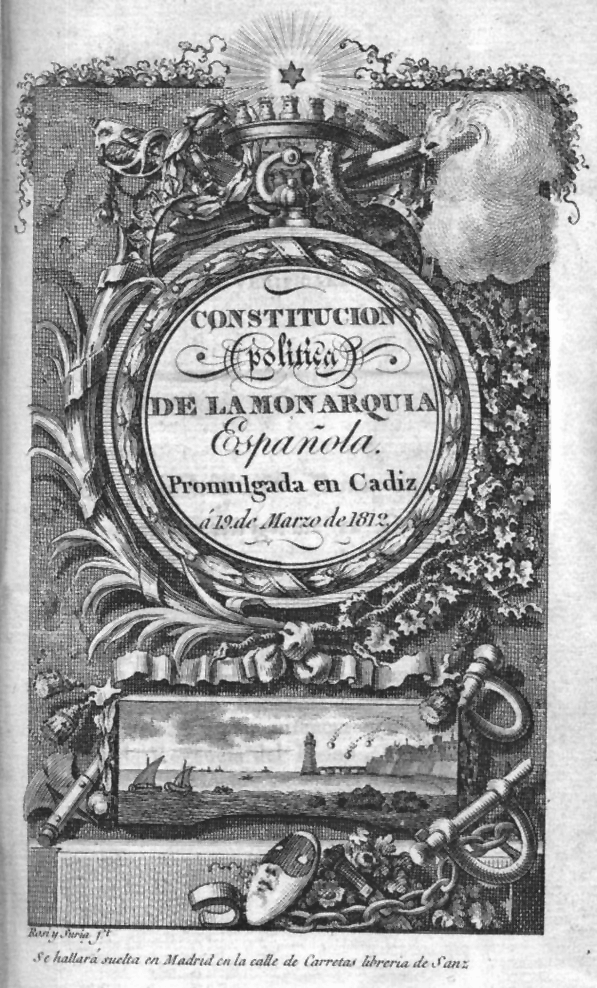
Spanish Constitution of 1812

In its first session, the Cortes promulgated the proposition that it, rather than the king, was the national sovereign since it represented the people. Then, the national assembly divided the government into legislative, executive and judiciary branches. Given the contingencies of war that resulted from the forced displacement of Fernando VII, the regency announced that it would act as the executive until his restoration.

The national assembly restructured the government while prosecuting a war in Spain and maintaining control overseas. Once deliberations started, the delegates split into liberal and conservative factions. Conservative Spaniards saw the Cortes at Cádiz as, at best, an interim solution until "the Desired One", as Fernando VII was called by his supporters, could be restored to the throne. Most monarchists, however, did not admit that a parliamentary body could legislate in the absence of a king. The liberals carried on the reformist philosophy of Carlos III and added to it many of the ideas of the French Revolution. They wanted equality before the law, a centralized government, an efficient civil service, a reform of the tax system, the replacement of feudal privileges by freedom of contract and the recognition of property rights. As the liberals were the majority, they were able to transform the assembly from an interim government to a constitutional convention.

The product of the Cortes' deliberations reflected the liberals' dominance. The Spanish Constitution of 1812 came to be the "sacred code" of liberalism, and during the 19th century, it served as a model for liberal constitutions of Latin nations. The national assembly created a unitary state with equal laws across the Spanish Empire. The principal aim of the new constitution was the prevention of arbitrary and corrupt royal rule; it provided for a limited monarchy that governed through ministers subject to parliamentary control. It established that the unicameral legislature would meet annually in the capital. The constitution maintained that suffrage was not to be determined by property qualifications, and it favoured the position of the commercial class in the new parliament since there was no special provision for the Catholic Church or the nobility. The constitution set up a rational and efficient centralised administrative system, based on newly formed provinces and municipalities, rather than following historic boundaries. The repeal of traditional property restrictions gave the liberals the freer economy that they wanted. However, the Spanish Constitution of 1812 denied people of African ancestry political rights and representation.

Its first regulation includes one of the first examples of a seasonally adjusted schedule, a practice which led to the adoption of daylight savings time a century later.

== Aftermath ==
A revolutionary document, the Spanish Constitution of 1812 marked the initiation of the Spanish tradition of liberalism, and when Fernando VII was restored to the throne in 1814, he refused to recognize it. He dismissed the Cortes Generales on 4 May and ruled as an absolute monarch. These events foreshadowed the long conflict between liberals and traditionalists that marked Spanish history in the 19th and early 20th centuries.

The Cádiz Cortes declared that the people of Spain have the sovereignty of all kingdoms of the Monarchy of Spain (including those of the Crown of Castile in the Americas) and proclaimed the extinction of the system of kingdoms and provinces of Spain and the Indies. The majority of the Criollo people of Spanish America rejected the pretensions of the Spaniards and assumed the sovereignty of the former American kingdoms of the Crown of Castile, over which the King of Spain had been sovereign.

Spain's American colonies took advantage of the postwar chaos to proclaim their independence. Most established republican governments. The fact that the Constitution was considered too liberal by the conservative elements in the colonies only precipitated their decision to join the effort for independence from Spain. When Ferdinand was restored to the throne in Madrid, he expended wealth and manpower in a vain effort to reassert control over the colonies. The move was unpopular among liberal officers assigned to the American wars. By the second half of 1826 only Cuba and Puerto Rico remained under the Spanish flag in the Americas, with the Philippines and Guam also under Spanish rule in Asia.

== See also ==
- Spanish Constitution of 1812
- Provincial deputation in Spanish America
- Spanish Empire
- Timeline of the Peninsular War
- Real Teatro de las Cortes
