= Tribute of 100 virgins =

Spanish national myth

The tribute of 100 virgins (Spanish: tributo de las cien doncellas) is a Spanish national myth as part of the Reconquista ideology. The legend rests on a narrative of annual tribute of one hundred virgin maidens paid by the Christian kingdom of Asturias to the Muslim emirate of Córdoba. The narrative also suggests that fifty were to be of noble birth and fifty commoners. The myth of tribute has been described "historically apocryphal but ideologically accurate" because it played important propaganda role in the formation and affirmation of the Reconquista ideology in the later Middle Ages, and it still figures prominently to this day in Spanish national cultural memory.

== Myth's origin ==
The political and military frontier on the Iberian Peninsula of the time, dividing different religio-ethnic communities, was porous, among other, for inter-faith marriages and the political alliances. However, practices such as Mauregato's, who forged amicable relationships with the Moors, and who allowed intermarriages between the Moors and the Asturias, where these exogamous marriages served to create a "network of social affection" among different kinships, despite being in line with "fundamental role" of contemporary in the medieval world as "peaceweaving instruments" and Christian ideology, was never accepted by the Church.

Thus, the origin of the myth of tribute is placed in the reign of Mauregatus the Usurper (783–789), who, according to a narrative, have usurped the throne rightfully belonging to his nephew Alfonso II of Asturias by using magic and by allying himself with the Moors. The legend does not appear until after the fabrication of the Privilegio del voto around 1150. This text, which describes the mythical Battle of Clavijo in 834, where Saint James saved the Asturians, claims that as a result the Spaniards owed annual tribute to the cathedral of Saint James in Compostela. Though propagation of the legend was not limited to chronicles, Lucas of Tuy, writing in 1236 described how Mauregatus "gave many high-born and also low-born maidens [to the Saracens] in marriage due to an agreement with the Saracens so that he might be at peace with them," adding a "sinister spin" to the story through subsequent chapters.

== Narrative ==
Basic narrative started evolving around King Mauregatus' amicable relationships with the Moors, who was assassinated by revolting counts Arias and Oveco in 788, in revenge for granting the Moors such a repulsive tribute. His successor, Bermudo I, tried to negotiate for a tribute of money instead. Bermudo was succeeded by Alfonso II, nicknamed "the Chaste", who fully rejected the tribute and had to deal with military consequences. He won the Battle of Lutos and killed the Moorish Captain Mugait, thus achieving his goal: no more tribute. The next king, Ramiro I, with the help of Bernardo del Carpio defeated the Moors at the (fictitious) Battle of Clavijo. The Moorish rulers were reportedly scared, by the growing military strength of the northern Christians, into giving up demands for the tribute.

== Analysis ==
There is an implicit attack on the licentiousness of the Moors in this myth, specifically in that what is being demanded was virgins. The Moors' sexual libertinism, or alleged sexual libertinism, was a key thread in Christian attacks on it and in motivation for the Reconquista. One of Abd al-Rahman's successors, Abd al-Rahman II, was rumored to have limited his sexual partners to virgins, i.e., he did not make love with the same woman twice, presumably because he preferred the variety. (See es:Abderramán II#Familia e hijos.) The legend of the tribute of the 100 virgins did not begin during the reign of Abd al-Rahman I, but much later.

== See also ==
- Kingdom of Sobrarbe
- Kosovo Myth
- El Cid
- Slavery in al-Andalus
- Baqt
