= Ofelia Rey Castelao =

Galician historian, writer, and university professor

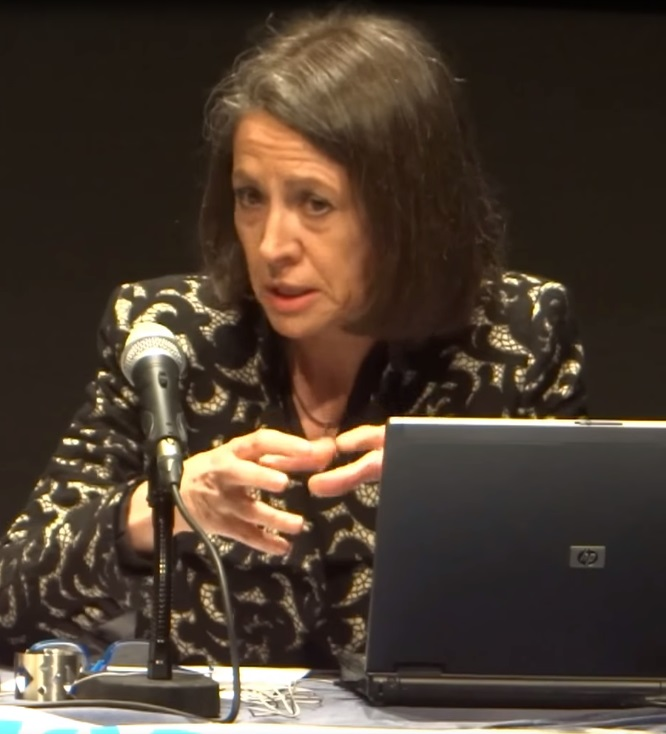
- Born: 1956
- Occupation: Historian
- Awards: María Josefa Wonenburger Planells Prize (5, 2011)
- Academic career
- Fields: Woman, history
- Institutions: University of Santiago de Compostela (1978–)
- Position held: professor (2002–)

Ofelia Rey Castelao (born 1956) is a Galician historian, writer, and university professor. Focusing her research on women's history, she studies female migration and the insertion of Galician women in the literate culture. Rey Castelao was awarded the Premio Nacional de Historia de España (National History Prize of Spain) in 2022.

== Early life and education ==
Ofelia Rey Castelao was born in A Estrada, Pontevedra, Spain, in 1956.

After studying Geography and History at the University of Santiago de Compostela (USC), Rey Castelao obtained a degree in history in 1978, with her thesis receiving the Extraordinary Prize from that university. That same year (1978), the Ministry of Education and Science of Spain awarded her the National Award for the Best Scholars. In 1984, her doctoral thesis (El voto de Santiago en la España moderna (The vote of Santiago in modern Spain), presented at the same university, was awarded "outstanding cum laude", and she received again the Extraordinary Prize. In 1985, she received the Premio a las Tesis Doctorales de la Diputación Provincial de Pontevedra.

== Career ==
Between 1979 and 1981, Rey Castelao was a research fellow of the Ministry of Education. In 1978 she began to work as a scholarship holder and assistant professor of Modern History at the Faculty of Geography and History of USC. In 1986, she became a professor, and in 2002, a full professor. In August 1990, she was appointed corresponding member for Spain and Mediterranean Europe of the Commission Internationale de Démographie Historique (International Commission of Historical Demography). Between 1990 and 2005, she was director of the journal Obradoiro de Historia Moderna (Workshop of modern history). Since 1992, she has directed several national and international research projects. Since 2002, she has been Professor of Modern History in the Faculty of Geography and History at the University of Santiago. In July 2005, in Sydney, Australia, she was elected member of the Bureau de la Commission Internationale de Dèmographie Historique. In 2006, she was invited by the School for Advanced Studies in the Social Sciences in Paris, where she served as Director of Studies. From January 2006 to October 2009, she was the Coordinator of History and Art at the Agencia Nacional de Evaluación y Prospectiva.

Rey Castelao has been the director of several doctoral theses, as well as numerous other undergraduate dissertations.

She is a member of the scientific committee of academic journals, such as Tiempos Modernos (Complutense University of Madrid), Revista de Investigaciones Históricas (University of Valladolid), Contrahistorias. La otra mirada de Clío (National Autonomous University of Mexico), Historia Social, Trocadero (University of Cádiz), Mélanges de la Casa de Velázquez, Estudis (University of Valencia), among many others. She is a member of the advisory board of the History Library of the CSIC.

She has published twelve books and more than 100 chapters and articles, as well as papers at national and international conferences.

== Awards and honours ==
- 2011: Premio María Josefa Wonenburger Planells for research, granted by the Secretary of Equality of the Galician Regional Government.
- 2022: National Prize for Spanish History, for the work El vuelo corto. Mujeres y migraciones en la Edad Moderna (Women and Migrations in the Modern Age), granted by USC.

== Selected works ==
=== Essays in Spanish ===
- 1981: Aproximación a la historia rural en la comarca de la Ulla. Santiago: Universidad de Santiago de Compostela, Secretariado de Publicacións.
- 1984: El Voto de Santiago en la España Moderna. Santiago: Universidad de Santiago de Compostela.
- 1985: La historiografía del Voto de Santiago. Recopilación crítica de una polémica histórica. Santiago: Universidad de Santiago de Compostela, Servicio de Publicacións.
- 1985: La renta del Voto de Santiago y las instituciones jacobeas. Santiago de Compostela: (s.n.).
- 1986: La crisis de las rentas eclesiásticas en España: el ejemplo del Voto de Santiago. Santiago de Compostela: (s.n.).
- 1988: La monarquía y la Iglesia de Santiago en los siglos XVI y XVII. Santiago de Compostela: Subdirección Xeral do Libro e Patrimonio Documental, D.L. 1988
- 1992: Poder y privilegios en la Europa del siglo XVIII. Madrid: Síntesis, D.L. 1992
- 1993: El Voto de Santiago, claves de un conflicto. Santiago de Compostela: (s.n.).
- 1995: Montes y política forestal en la Galicia del antiguo régimen. Santiago: Universidad de Santiago.
- 1995: Montes y política forestal en la Galicia del Antiguo Régimen. Santiago de Compostela: Universidade, Servicio de Publicacións e Intercambio Científico.
- 2003: Libros y lectura en Galicia: siglos XVI-XIX. Santiago de Compostela: Junta de Galicia, Dirección Xeral de Promoción Cultural.
- 2005: Vázquez Lijó, José Manuel. Santiago: Universidad de Santiago de Compostela
- 2006: Los mitos del Santiago el Mayor, 2006, Nigra Trea.

=== Essays in Galician ===
- 1998: A Galicia clásica e barroca. Vigo: Editorial Galaxia.
- 2003: Libros e lectura en Galicia. Santiago de Compostela: Junta de Galicia.

=== Essays in French ===
- 1994: Les migrations internes et à moyenne distance en Europe, 1500-1900
- 2005: "Partir ou rester. L'effet des régimes démographiques et systèmes familiaux sur la participation des femmes aux flux migratoires". Paper in French published in, Une démographie au féminin: trajectoires et risques dans la vie des femmes, XIXe-XXe siècles. Lyon, 2005.
