= Voto de Santiago =

Religious vow by Iberian kingdoms to Saint James

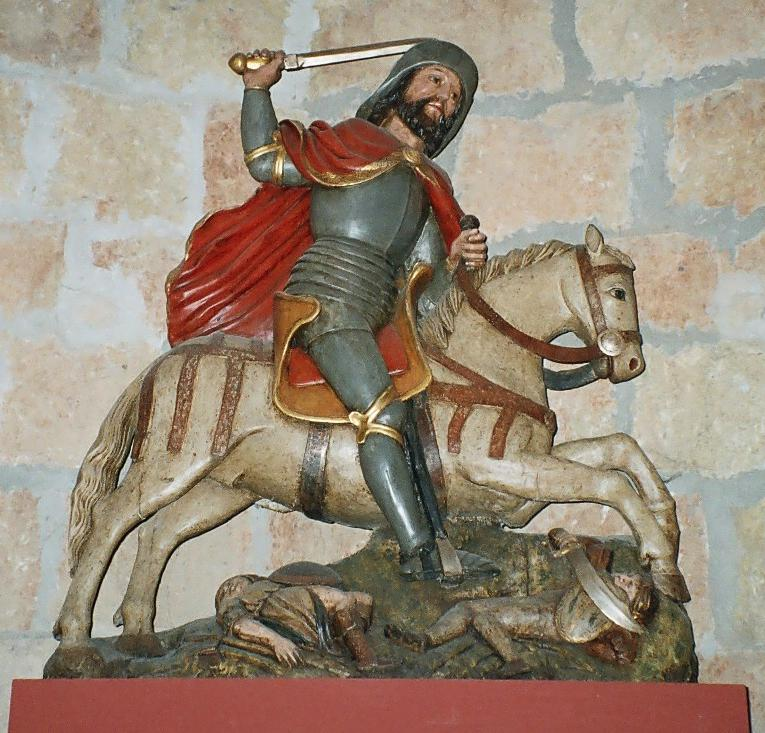
Saint James the Moorslayer, Museum of holy art of Saint James, Carrión de los Condes, Palencia, Spain.

The Voto de Santiago was an offering rendered by the Christian kingdoms of Asturias, Galicia, León and Castille to Saint James and his cathedral at Santiago de Compostela in thanks for the saint's miraculous intervention, which they believed had enabled them to win the legendary battle of Clavijo against the Moors. The battle had resulted from his refusal to pay the Tribute of 100 Damsels to the Emirate of Córdoba.

This was vowed to James before the battle by Ramiro I of Asturias in Calahorra, offering Saint James part of the booty taken from the Moors along with the first fruits and crops from each year's harvest as an ex voto. It was then paid for via a special tax. It was renewed and formalised by a national festival in 1643 for his feast day (25 July) by Philip IV of Spain. It was abolished in 1808 by the Bayonne Statute.

== Bibliography ==
- Rey Castelao, Ofelia (1985). La historiografía del Voto de Santiago: Recopilación crítica de una polémica histórica. Santiago de Compostela: Universidad de Santiago de Compostela.
