= ¡Santiago y cierra, España! =

Battle-cry of the Kingdom of Spain

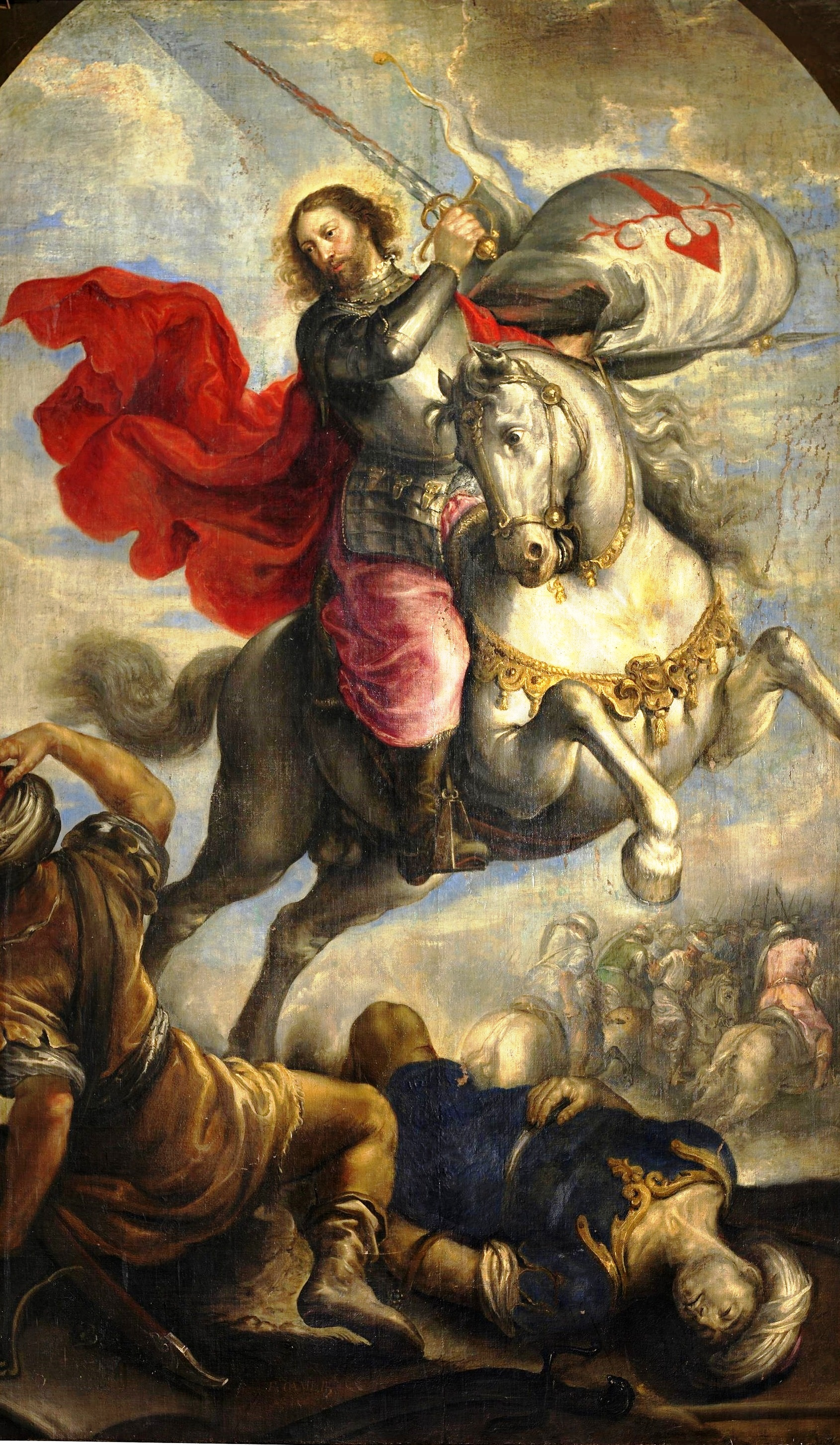
Saint James, represented by 17th-century painter Francisco Camilo as a Moor-slayer and with the Cross of Saint James as an attribute.

¡Santiago y cierra, España! is a Spanish-language phrase. The invoking of the apostle's name (Santiago, Saint James in English) is said to have been a common battle cry of Christian soldiers in medieval Iberia and beyond into the Early Modern Period. The full form, using a conjugated form of the verb cerrar, (Note: According to Pedro de Ribadeneira, as a synonym of acometer (transl. assail).) is recorded since the late-16th and 17th centuries. It made a comeback in 1930s Spain as it became the motto of Ramiro de Maeztu's right-wing magazine Acción Española. As a reflection of a mythicized look on the middle ages, embedded in narratives of the Reconquista of Catholic Spain against the Muslim Other-enemy-invader, it has thus been historically embraced as a political slogan by arch-conservative milieus of Spanish society. As a nationalist symbolic banner, the phrase has been a staple within far-right discourses in Spain, developed in war-related and national self-affirmation contexts.
