= James Matamoros =

Representation of apostle James the Great

Saint James
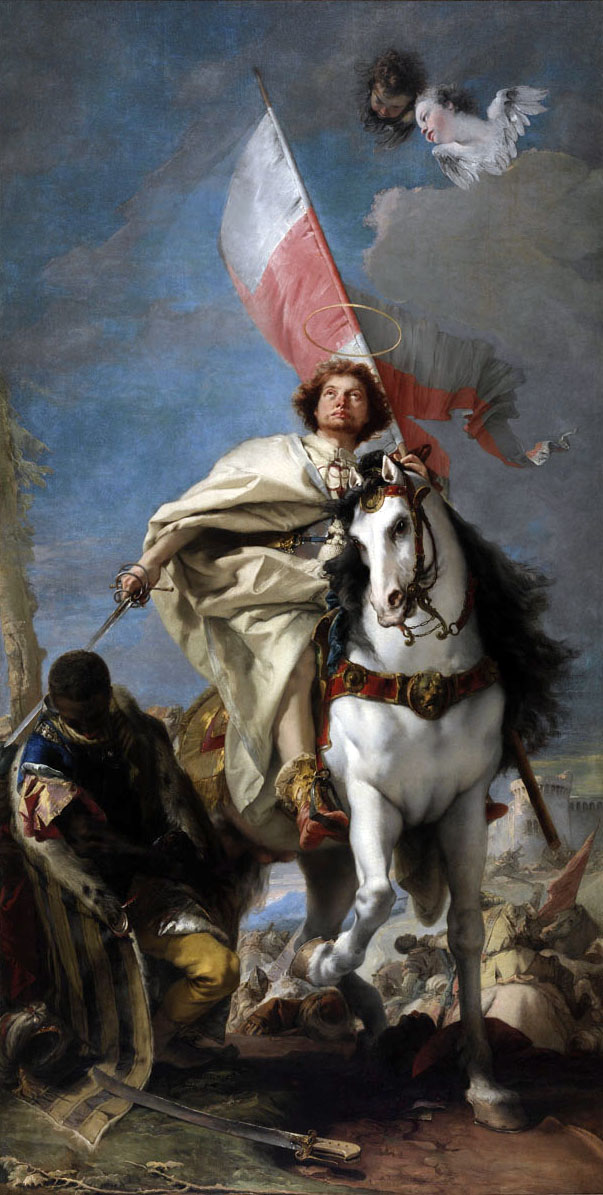
- Saint James Matamoros by Giovanni Battista Tiepolo

The Moor-slayer
- Venerated in: Folk Catholicism
- Feast: 25 July (same feast day as the Apostle James the Great)
- Attributes: Riding a white steed, holding a flag and a sword
- Patronage: Spain, and the Spanish people

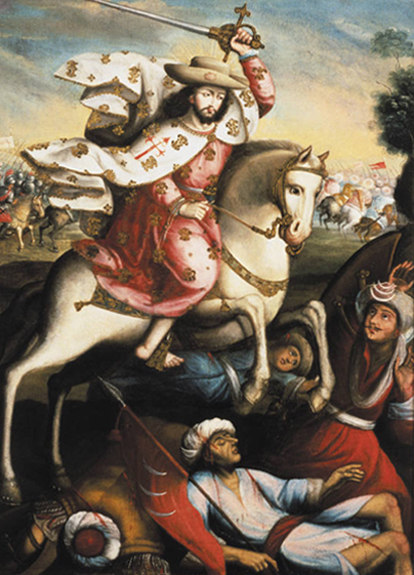
St. James slaying Moors. (Anonymous, 18th century, Cusco School of Peru)

Saint James the Moor-slayer (Spanish: Santiago Matamoros) is the name given to the representation (painting, sculpture, etc.) of the apostle James the Great, as a legendary, miraculous figure who appeared at the also legendary Battle of Clavijo, helping the Christians conquer the Muslim Moors.

The story was invented centuries after the alleged battle was supposed to have taken place. "Matamoros" is not a name nor an advocation of the saint. Aspects of the historical Battle of Monte Laturce (859) were incorporated into this legend of the battle of Clavijo, as Claudio Sánchez-Albornoz demonstrated in 1948. Historian Jean Mitchell-Lanham says: "While this event is based on legend, the supposed battle has provided one of the strongest ideological icons in the Spanish national identity."

In the 17th century, followers of his cult (Santiaguistas) proposed the patronage of Spain under his name, in contrast to those who favored Teresa of Ávila. The Santiaguistas overcame and won this religious debate, naming him the Patron Saint of Spain, until November 1760 when Pope Clement XIII rescinded this honor and officially declared the Immaculate Conception as the patroness of Spain as a country, and installed the historical apostle James as patron of the Spaniards.

== Origin ==
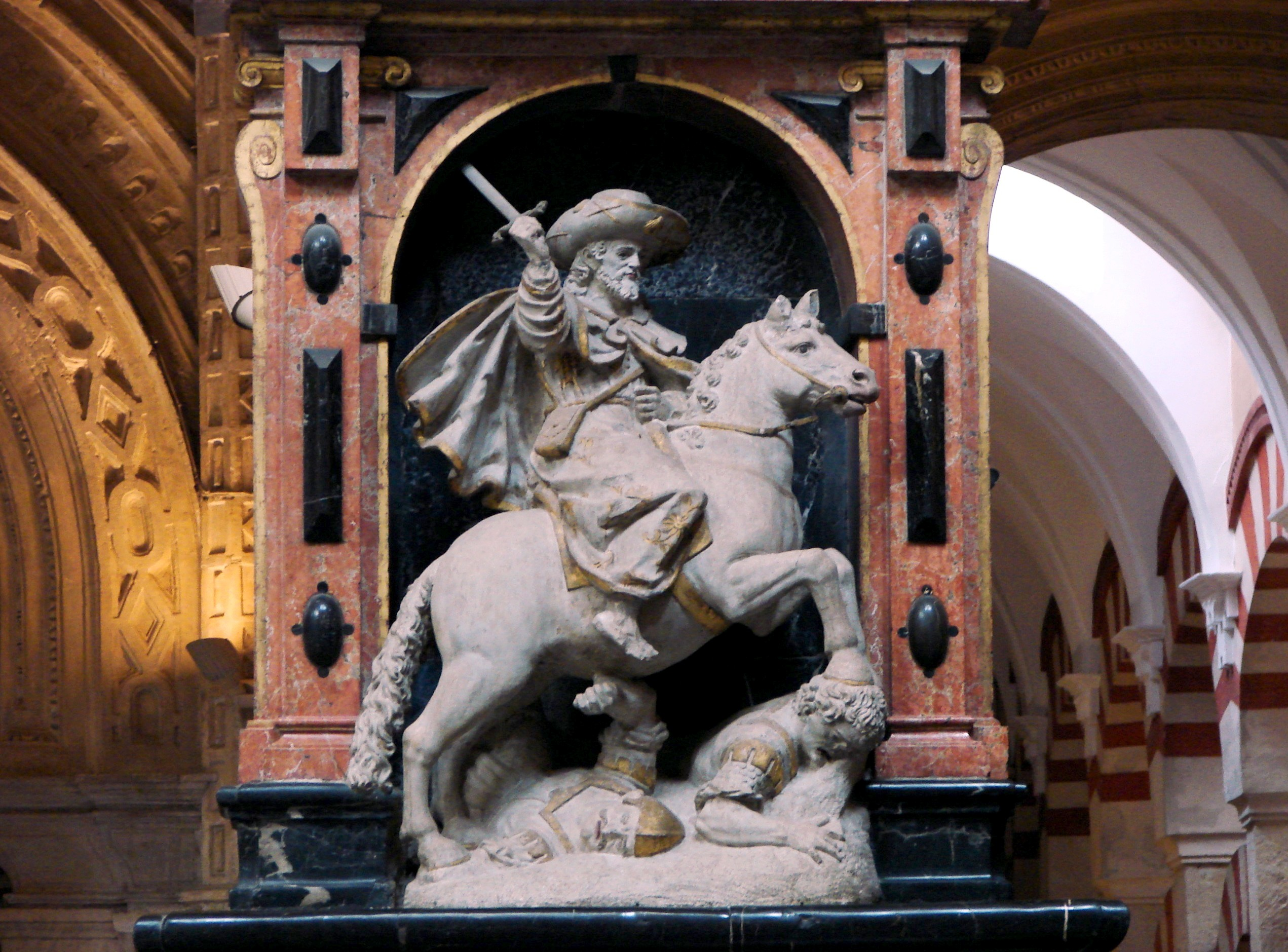
Statue of James Matamoros, Mosque–Cathedral of Córdoba, Spain

The Christian king Alfonso II of Asturias died in 842 and was succeeded by his nephew, Ramiro I of Asturias.

Meanwhile, in Christian circles, the legend grew that James, a disciple of Jesus, had gone to Spain, founded the Church there, and provided protection for the Christians. Historians have found no evidence for these old claims. Old bones that were discovered in what is now Santiago de Compostela were venerated as his relics.

The legend was that a battle took place. On Alfonso's death, the Moors demanded the reinstatement of the tribute of 100 virgins (fifty noble and fifty commoner), which Alfonso had defied. Ramiro denied them the tribute and prepared for battle. On the night before the Battle of Clavijo, he dreamt of St. James, who told him that God had chosen James as the patron for the Spanish kingdoms.

According to the legend, James appeared as a warrior on his white horse with a white banner to help Christian armies of King Ramiro I in a battle against the Moors. The Christians marched on the cry of ¡Dios ayuda a Santiago! "God save St. James!". They slew more than 5000 Muslims and James became known as "Matamoros".

=== Adaptation in Spanish America ===
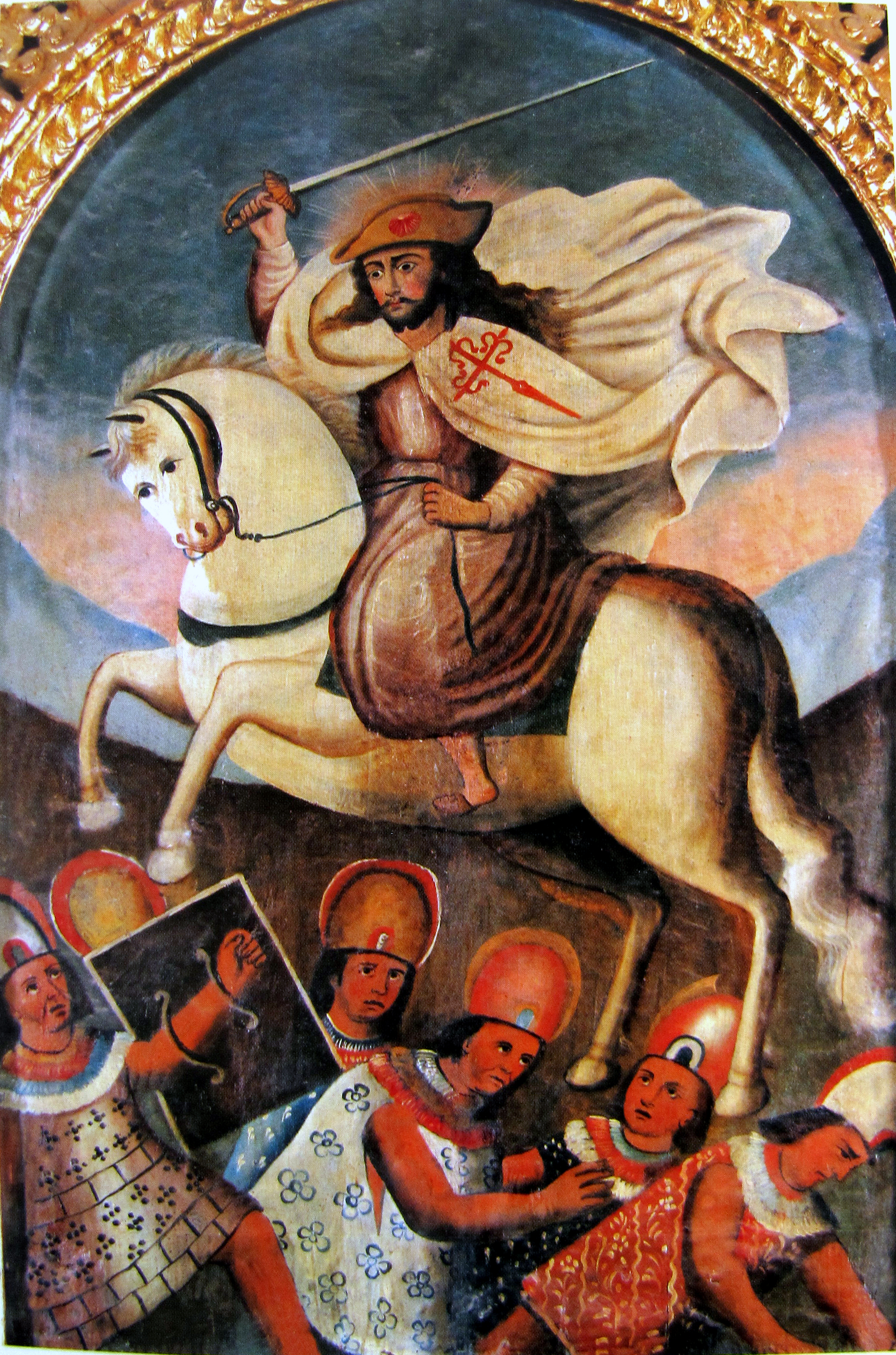
Santiago Mataindios, "Saint James the Indian-slayer" in an 18th-century painting in the Cusco Cathedral, Peru.

The iconography of James Matamoros was used in the Spanish colonization of the Americas as a rival force to the indigenous gods, and protector of Spaniards from the indigenous peoples of the Americas. He was depicted as a conquistador.

=== Adaptation in the Philippines ===
Spanish colonial era reliefs depicting Santiago Matamoros serve as gate icons of Fort Santiago in Intramuros in Manila, and Fuerte de la Concepción y del Triunfo in Ozamiz. Other places in the Philippines that have Saint James the Great under this specific title as patron include Plaridel, Bulacan; Bolinao, Pangasinan; Betis, Pampanga; Libon, Albay; Ibaan, Batangas and Dapitan. Among some Chinese Filipinos, the apostle is syncretised with the similarly martial Chinese deity Guan Yu, sometimes called Santo Santiago, Te Ya Kong (Hokkien Chinese: 帝爺公; Pe̍h-ōe-jī: Tè-iâ-kong) or Kuan Kong (Hokkien Chinese: 關公; Pe̍h-ōe-jī: Koan-kong).

== Namesakes ==
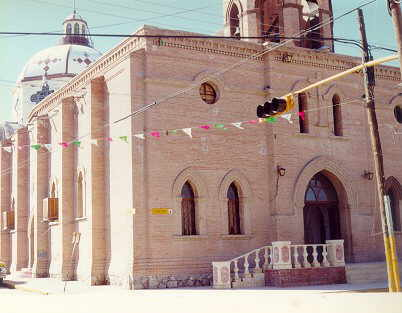
Roman Catholic Church in the Mexican settlement of Matamoros, Coahuila.

The Order of Santiago, a Spanish order of knighthood, originates from St. James' supposed involvement at the Battle of Clavijo. A wide number of Mexican settlements were named Matamoros by Spanish settlers in honor of their patron saint.

Matamoros can also be found as a Hispanic family name, for instance Miguel Matamoros.

¡Santiago! or ¡Santiago y cierra España! has been the historical battle cry of Spanish armies.

== Controversy ==
In the 1620s Spain debated who should be the country's patron—James, the current patron, or a combination of him and the newly canonized Teresa of Ávila (1515–1582). Teresa's promoters said Spain faced new challenges, especially the threat of Protestantism and the declining society at home, and needed a modern patron saint who understood these problems and could lead the Spanish nation back. Santiago's supporters (Santiaguistas) fought back viciously and won the day, but Teresa of Ávila remained far more popular at the local level.

The statue of James Matamoros at the Santiago de Compostela Cathedral, one of the holiest pilgrimages of the Catholic Church, was reported to be slated for removal after the 2004 Madrid train bombings perpetrated by radical Islamists in an effort to seek "harmony and understanding" with the Muslim community in Spain and to prevent anger from the Arab-Muslim world. However, church officials reversed that decision to remove the statue following an outcry.

== See also ==
- Camino de Santiago
- Fort Santiago, Intramuros
- Saint Emilian of Cogolla was said to appear with saint James in the battle of Simancas.
