= Bayonne Statute =

1808 royal charter on which Joseph Bonaparte based his rule of Spain

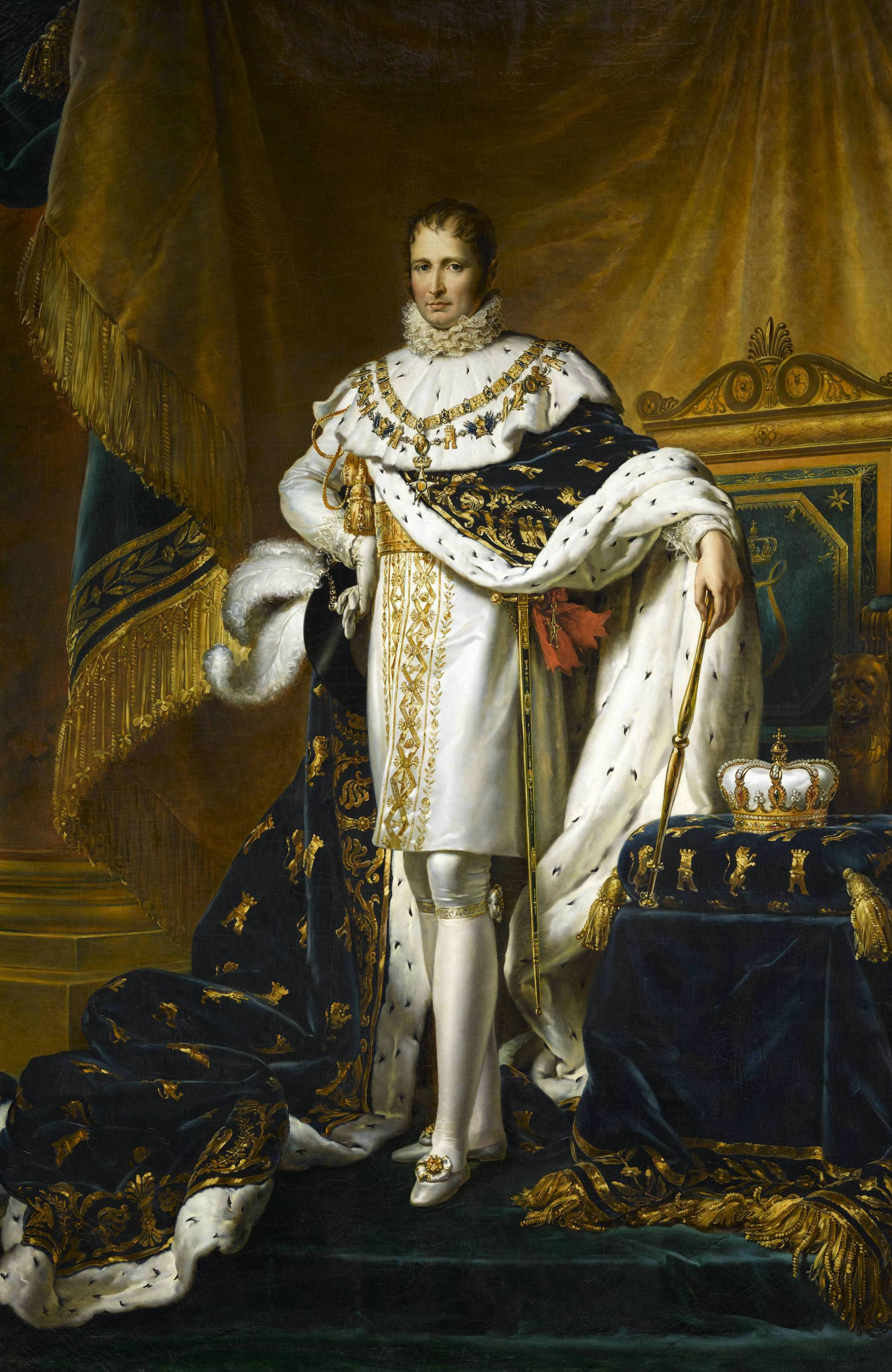
Portrait of Joseph Bonaparte by François Gérard, 1808

The Bayonne Statute (Spanish: Estatuto de Bayona), also called the Bayonne Constitution (Constitución de Bayona) or the Bayonne Charter (Carta de Bayona), (Note: Officially in the original document Constitution (Constitución), and officially in French, Acte Constitutionnel de l’Espagne) was a constitution or a royal charter (carta otorgada) approved in Bayonne, France, 6 July 1808, by Joseph Bonaparte as the intended basis for his rule as king of Spain.

The constitution was Bonapartist in overall conception, with some specific concessions made in an attempt to accommodate Spanish culture. Few of its provisions were ever put into effect: his reign as Joseph I of Spain was largely consumed by continuous conventional and guerrilla war as part of the Peninsular War.

== Background ==
In 1808, after a period of shaky alliance between the Spanish Antiguo Régimen and the Napoleonic French First Empire, the Mutiny of Aranjuez (17 March 1808) removed the king's minister Manuel de Godoy, Prince of the Peace, and led to the abdication of king Charles IV of Spain (19 March 1808). His son Ferdinand VII briefly held the reins of power, but Napoleon determined to settle the monarchy of Spain on a member of his own family: his older brother Joseph, conferred the title Prince of Spain to be hereditary on his children and grandchildren in the male and female line.

On 5 May 1808, Charles IV renounced his rights to the Spanish Crown in favor of Napoleon. Later the same day, Ferdinand VII, unaware of Charles's abdication, abdicated in favor of his father, effectively passing the Crown to Napoleon. Along with other Spanish members of the House of Bourbon, including Infante Antonio Pascual of Spain, they went into a comfortable, if forced, exile in France, at the Château de Valençay.

In an attempt to conform at least mildly to the tradition of legal continuity, Napoleon ordered his general Joachim Murat, Grand Duke of Berg, to convene in Bayonne a Cortes of thirty deputies chosen from among the notables of Spain to help draft and to approve the constitutional basis for the new regime. However, in the context of the Dos de Mayo Uprising in Madrid and various other uprisings elsewhere in Spain, only about a third of the invited Spanish notables attended. On 4 June 1808, Napoleon designated his brother Joseph as king of Spain; he was proclaimed king at Madrid on 25 July. The rump Cortes began meeting in Bayonne on 15 June to begin drafting a "constitution", for which Napoleon provided them with an extensive initial draft; it was promulgated July 8.

== Content ==
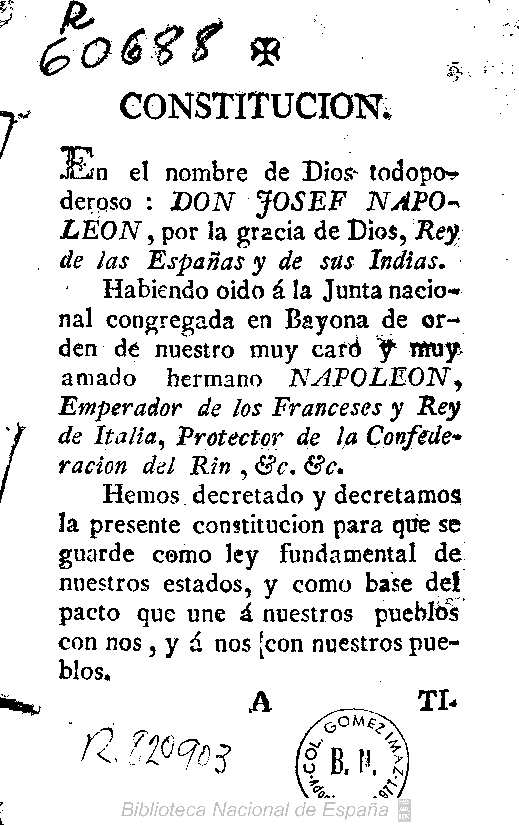
Constitution of 1808

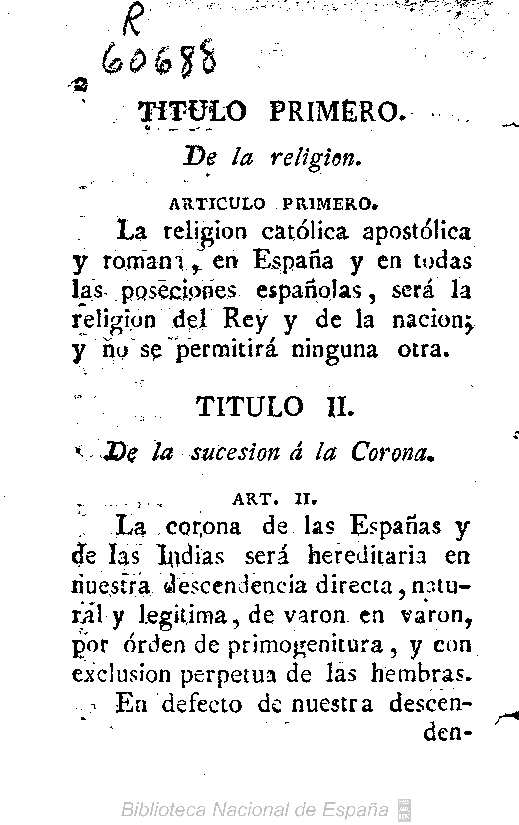
Constitution of 1808 p. 2 BNE

The Bayonne Statute placed many nominal limits on royal power, but few effective ones. There was to be a tricameral legislature; nine ministers (as against five or six in recent Bourbon governments); an independent judiciary; and various individual liberties were recognized, though not freedom of religion. Although generally Bonapartist in conception, the statute shows clear influence by the few Spanish notables who were involved in drafting it that it retained Catholicism as a state religion, and banned all other religions. In the Spanish tradition, it was promulgated "In the name of God Almighty" ("En el nombre de Dios Todopoderoso").

In the event, most provisions of the Statute were never put into practice: throughout the entire Bonapartist period in Spain, the constitution was effectively suspended by French military authorities. Most decisions were made by Napoleon and his generals, not by King Joseph. Nonetheless, French-controlled Spain saw some serious attempts at liberal reform, though many of them ignored the Bayonne Statute and, of course, this legislation was not recognized after the Bourbons were restored. The new regime abolished feudalism, the Inquisition, and the Council of Castile; suppressed numerous convents and monasteries as well as all military orders; declared that no new mayorazgos could be created; divided the country into French-style departments; abolished internal customs borders and many state monopolies; abolished the Mesta (a powerful association of sheep holders) and the tax known as the Voto de Santiago; privatized numerous state-owned factories; and began to introduce the Napoleonic Code into Spain's system of law.

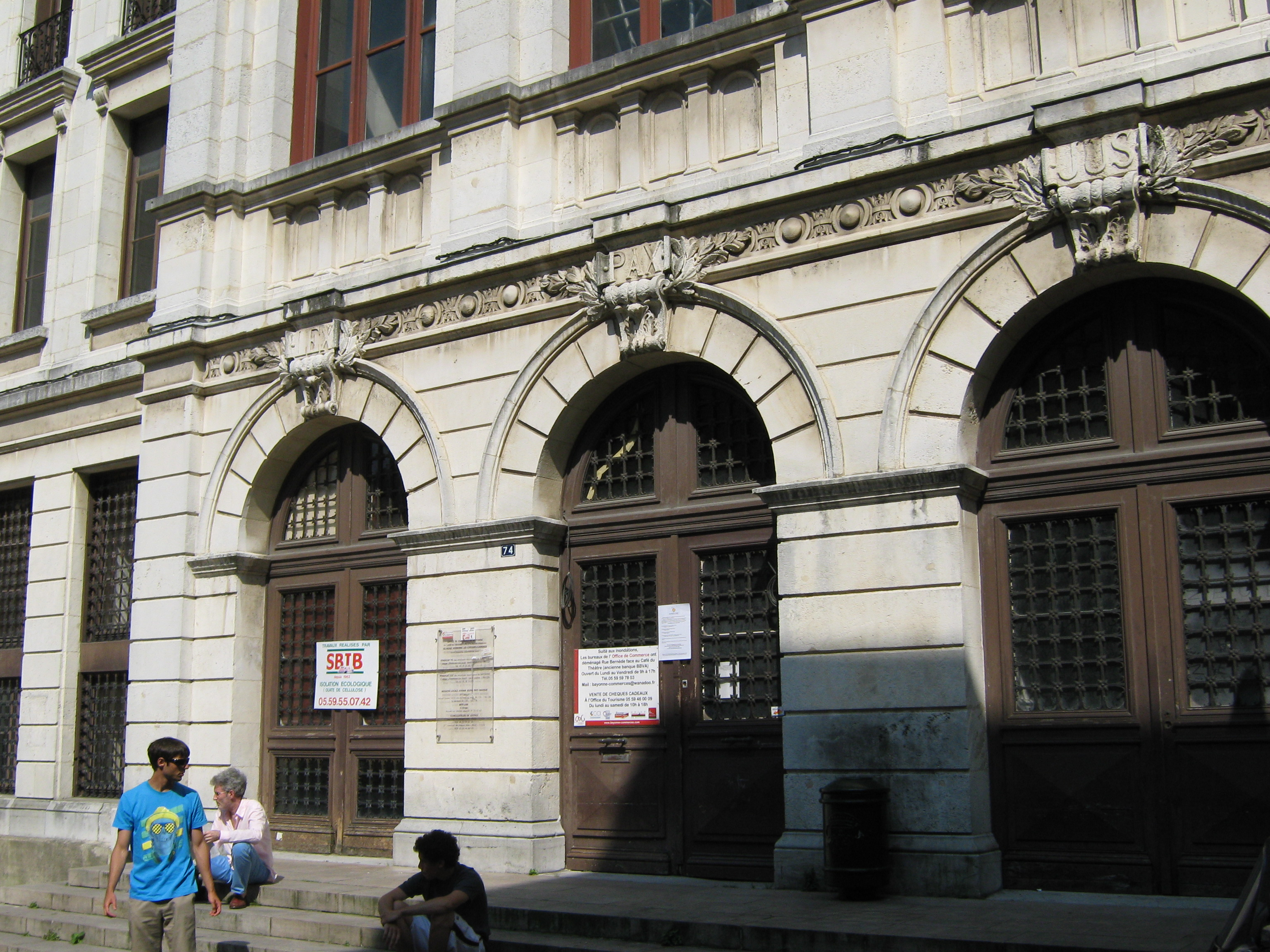
The Palais de Justice in Bayonne

== See also ==
- List of constitutions of Spain
- Spanish Constitution of 1812
