= Real Teatro de las Cortes =

Cultural property in San Fernando, Spain

Coordinates: 36°27′57″N 6°11′51″W

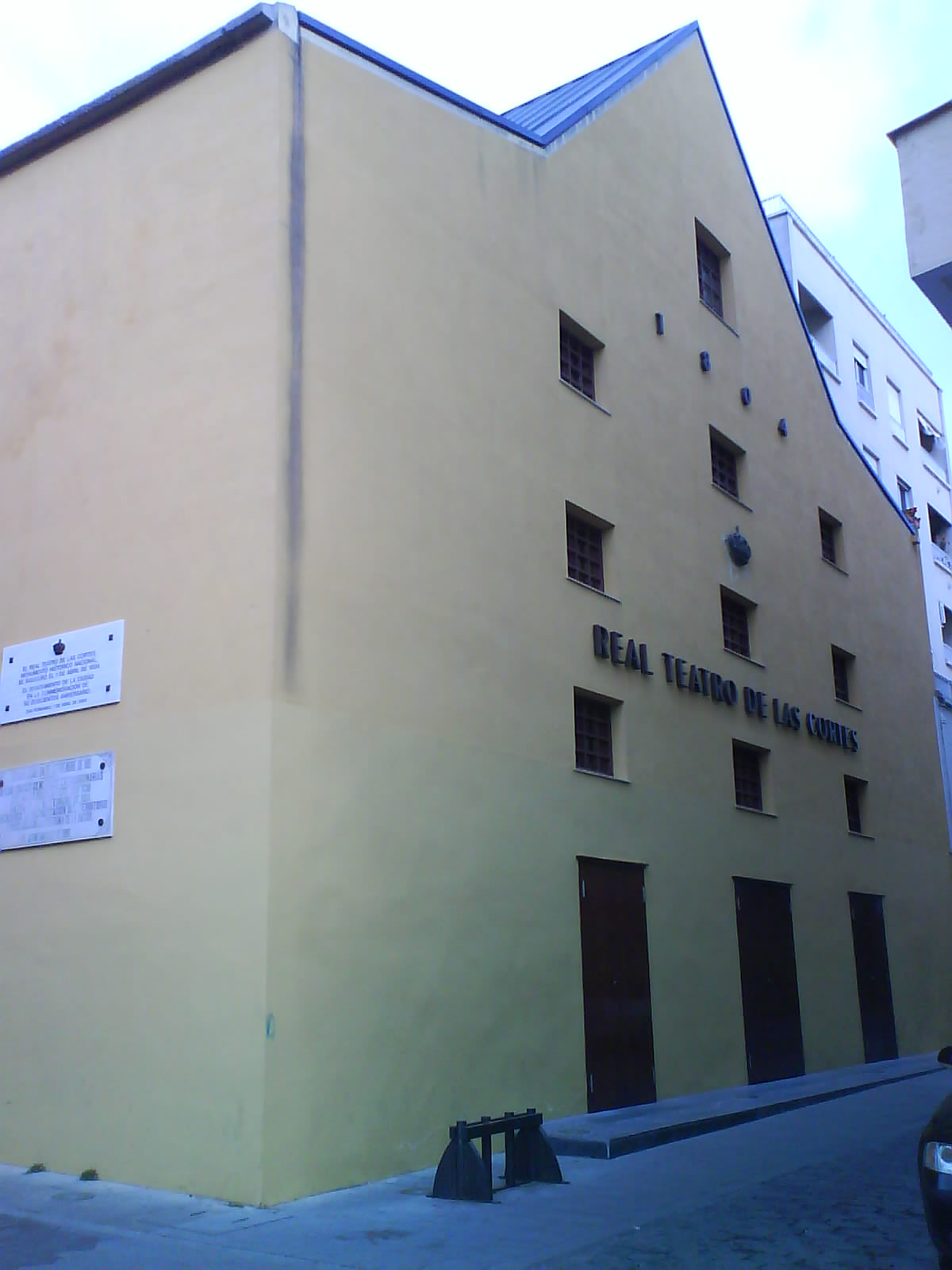

Real Teatro de las Cortes is a theatre located on Calle de las Cortes in San Fernando in the Province of Cádiz, Andalusia, Spain. It was established on 1 April 1804 as Teatro Cómico, and currently seats 433 people.
