= Spanish parliamentarism =

Political representation in Spain

Spanish parliamentarism is a tradition of political representation, legislative activity and governmental control, or parliamentary control of the government, that dates back to the medieval Cortes and the Ancien Régime, in a manner equivalent to the parliamentary system of other Western European nation-states (the Parliament of England or the Estates General of France).

== Studies ==
The meeting places, parliamentary customs and habits, and the practice of parliamentary debates with their consequent oratory, constitute the most visible formal aspects of that tradition.

Several prosopographical studies have been carried out on the deputies, senators or procurators in Cortes —and in general, of the bureaucratic elites— in different periods, detecting the systematic repetition of the same families —representing different parties—, in addition to other professional and formative traits.

== Up to the 17th century ==
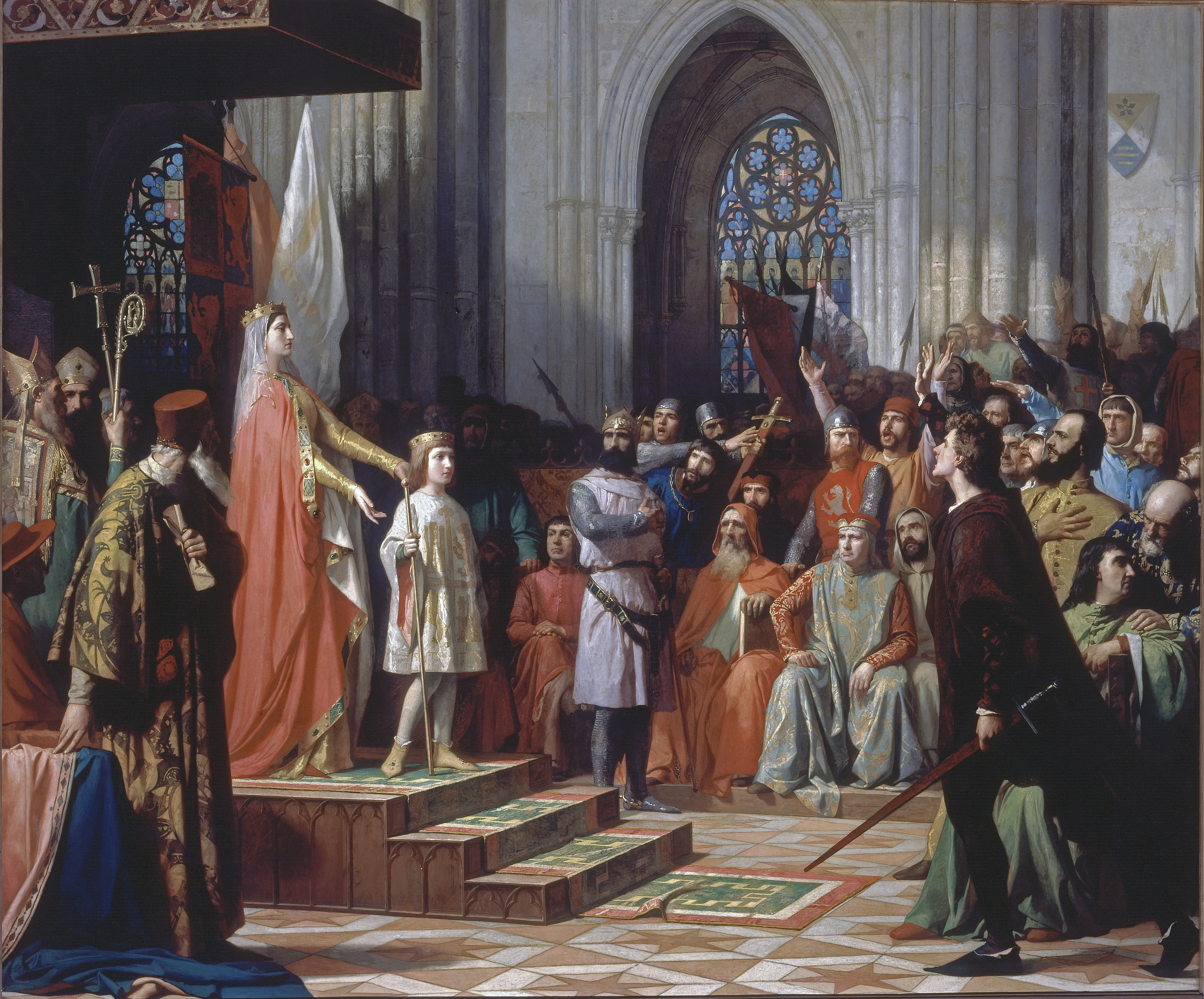
María de Molina presents her son Fernando IV at the Cortes of Valladolid in 1295. Oil on canvas by Antonio Gisbert Pérez. 1863. Congress of Deputies.

The Cortes, an institution derived from the Curia regia, began to take shape as a parliamentary institution of representation of the estates in the different Christian peninsular kingdoms from the end of the 12th century onwards. They meant the explicitness and periodic renewal of the political relationship between "king" and "kingdom". The first Cortes with the participation of the representatives of the cities were the Cortes of León of 1188, convened by the León monarch Alfonso IX. They were convened very frequently in the late Middle Ages and until the middle of the 17th century, when their functions were almost exclusively fiscal in the Crown of Castile, and of much greater competence in the kingdoms of the Crown of Aragon and Navarre, where the lesser royal power determined a greater power of the Cortes, supported by a whole theorization of the relationship between the two institutions.

The unification of the kingdoms of the Hispanic Monarchy (which between 1580 and 1640 included the kingdom of Portugal) did not mean institutional homogenization, and the Cortes of each kingdom maintained their separate existence, leaving the Cortes of Castile as the main fiscal support of the Monarchy throughout the Habsburg period (16th and 17th centuries).

In the second half of the 17th century the Cortes practically ceased to be convened.

- Cortes of Aragon
- Cortes of Castile
- General Court of Catalonia
- Cortes of León (the first, in 1188; since the 13th century they were convened jointly with those of Castile).
- Cortes of Navarre (the last, convened in 1828–1829)
- Portuguese Cortes
- Valencian Cortes

Despite some bibliographical use of the expression "Majorcan Corts", there was no institution equivalent to the Cortes in the kingdom of Majorca, with the Gran i General Consell fulfilling a similar role to a certain extent. When the meetings of the Cortes of the Crown of Aragon were held jointly, Majorcan representatives attended (see Cortes of Aragon).

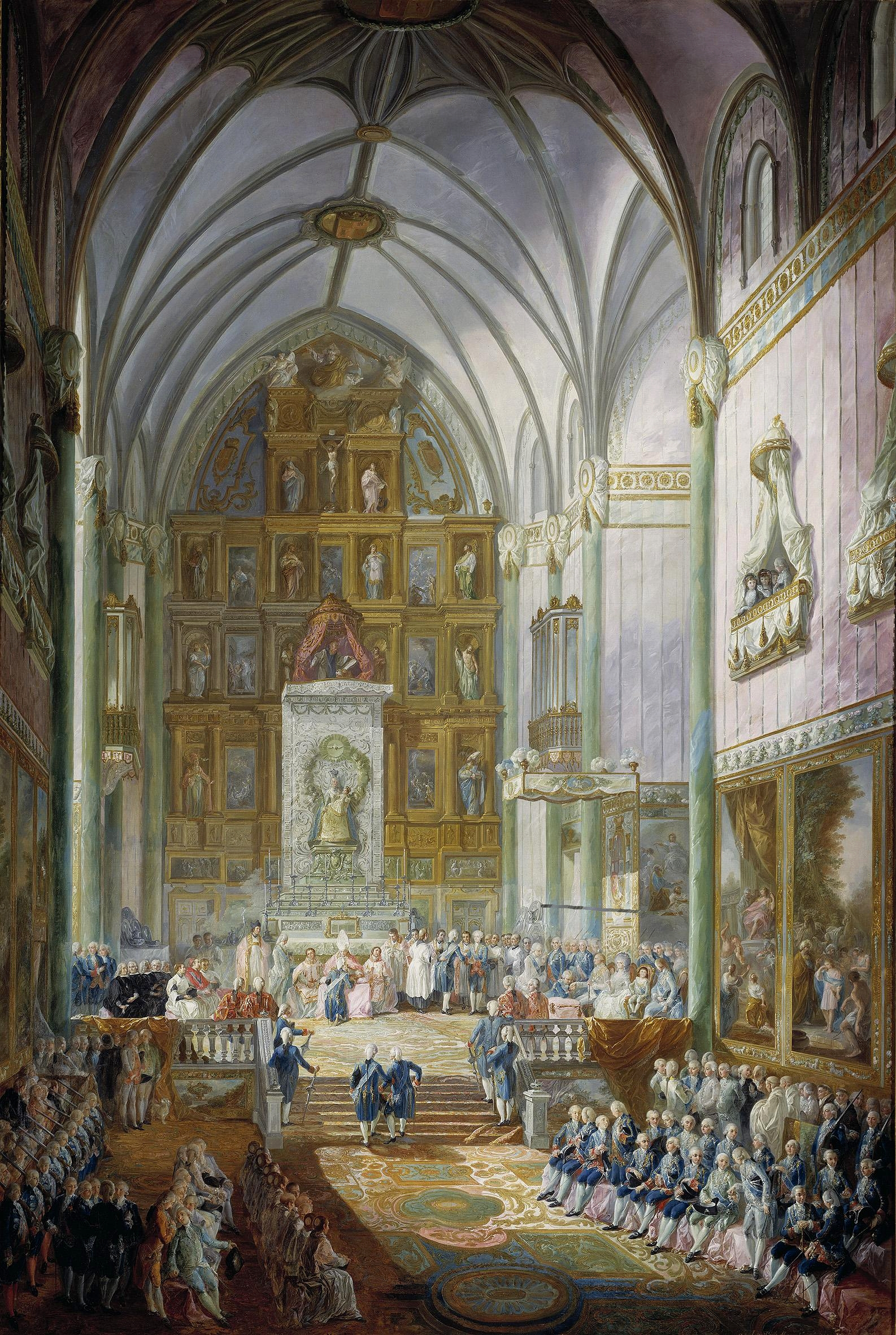
The Cortes, gathered in the church of the Church of Saint Jerome the Royal, Madrid, in 1789, swear their recognition to the Prince of Asturias, future Ferdinand VII. Painting by Luis Paret y Alcázar, 1791.

== 18th century ==
With the War of the Spanish Succession (1700-1715), the new Bourbon dynasty imposed the Nueva Planta Decrees, which annulled the particularist fueros of the Crown of Aragon, which allowed the kings to jointly convene the Cortes of all the kingdoms of the Hispanic Monarchy (except the Cortes of Navarre) following the customs and traditions of the Cortes of Castile, which became known as the Cortes Generales del Reino (General Courts of the Kingdom). They only had two convocations in the whole of the 18th century, to swear in the heir and to take notice of the successive alterations of the law of succession (Salic Law).

- Cortes of Madrid of 1713. Philip V initiated the Bourbon dynasty with the War of Spanish Succession, which in Spain is a civil war between Austracists and Bourbons. The Austracists were the majority in the Crown of Aragon, and their defeat allowed the imposition of the Bourbon absolutism that tried to centralize the institutions of the different peninsular kingdoms in the Castilian ones (Nueva Planta Decrees). Cortes were convened for the first time in Madrid, which were to be attended not only by the representatives of the Castilian cities, but also by representatives of Aragonese, Valencian, Catalan and Majorcan cities, which is why they were called Cortes Generales del Reino (General Courts of the Kingdom). It was approved, in the form of an Auto Acordado, the reception in Spain of the Salic Law, the traditional law of the French monarchy. Among other things, the Salic Law altered the traditional law of succession, by preventing the succession of women to the throne (nulla portio fæminis); although the issue remained a theoretical assumption that was not really resolved until the Carlist Wars. Different "pleas" were received from the procurators, such as the rationalization of taxes (at the suggestion of the Valencians, the Equivalent was established the following year).
- Cortes of Madrid of 1789. Charles IV was the first monarch to convene the Cortes Generales to swear in the heir to the Crown as Prince of Asturias. He did so for the swearing in of his son Ferdinand (the future Ferdinand VII). He took advantage of the occasion to repeal the Salic Law, arguing that this would restore to their former force and effect the venerated laws that had placed Isabella the Catholic on the Throne of Castile.

== 19th century ==
=== Parliamentarism in Cádiz ===
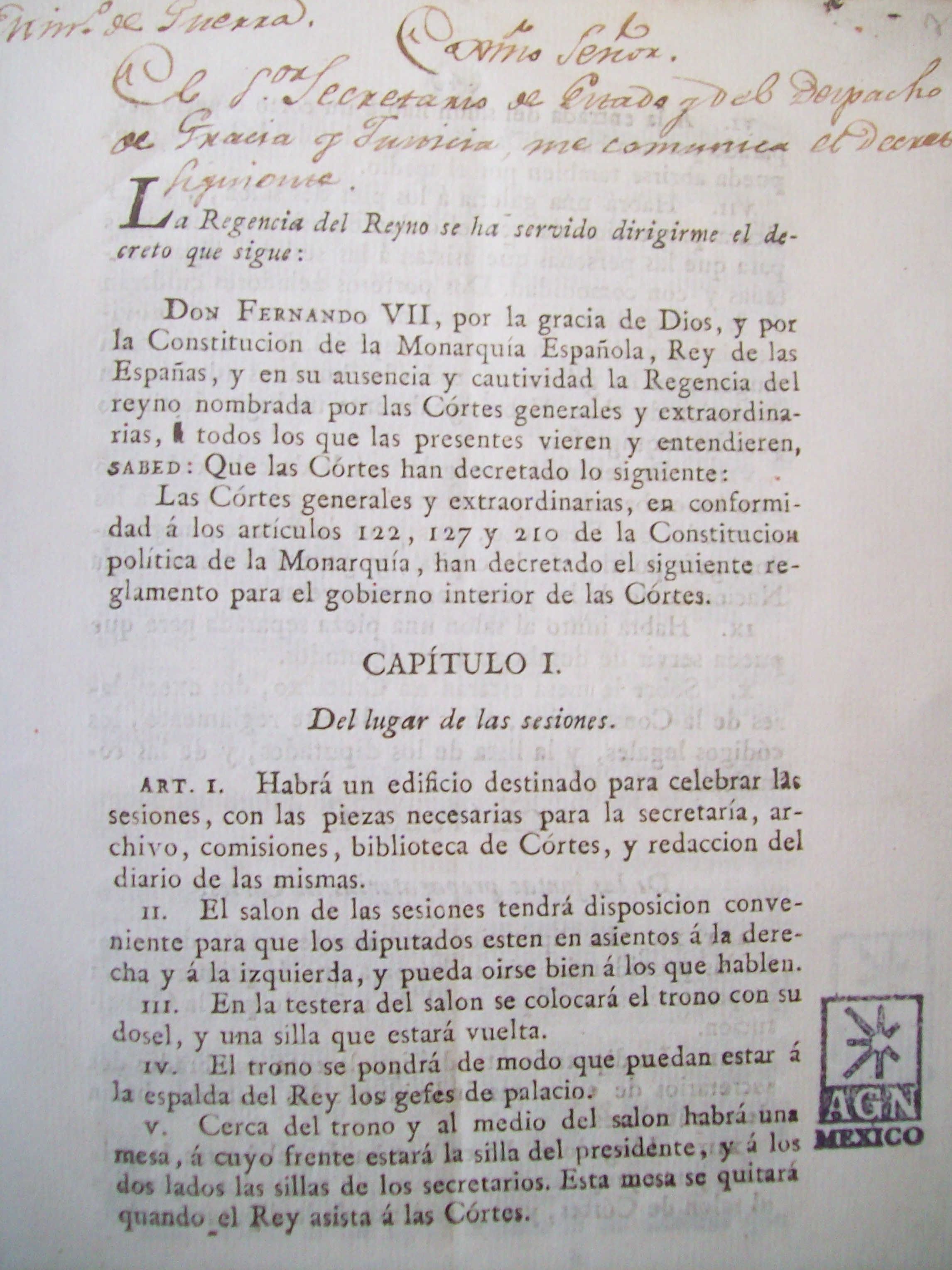
Regulations of the Cortes, 1813.

The agitated political life of the Contemporary Age in Spain was punctually reflected in each of the phases that Spanish parliamentarism went through.

Inaugurating the characteristics of contemporary liberal parliamentarism (national sovereignty, universal suffrage, separation of powers, recognition of rights), the Cortes of Cadiz stood out for their vital debates and the revolutionary nature of their legislation. These Cortes in fact exercised all the power, given that Ferdinand VII remained until 22 March 1814, retained in France by Napoleon. Meeting in 1810 in Cadiz, as it was the only city defensible against the French invasion, they used the so-called Real Teatro de las Cortes as their meeting place. At the end of the war, during a brief period in 1814, they chose the former church of the Colegio de Doña María de Aragón of the Augustinian friars as their meeting place in the city of Madrid, part of the complex of the Royal Monastery of La Encarnación.

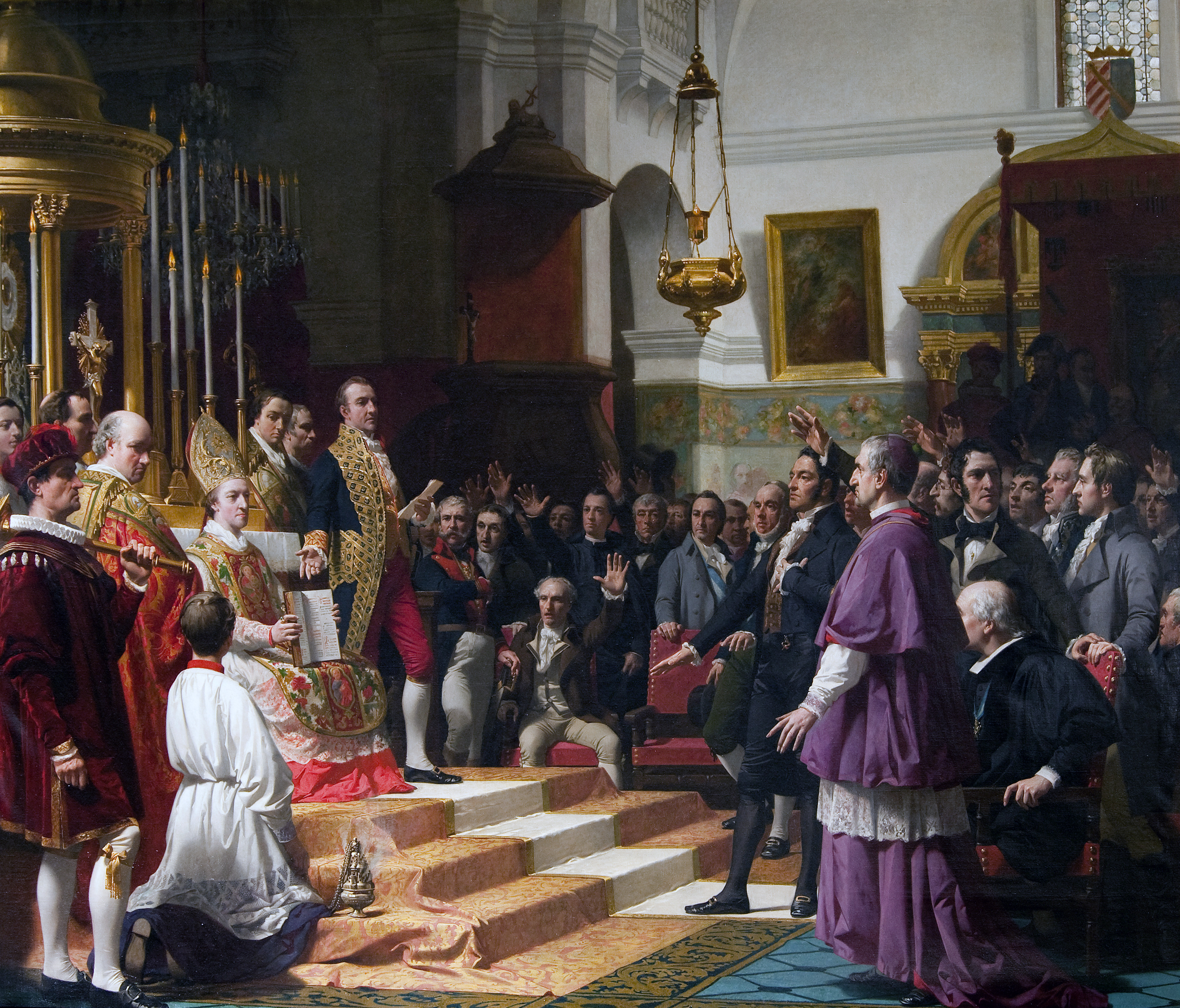
The deputies take the oath of office in the main church of San Fernando, 1810. History painting by Casado del Alisal, 1862.

After the initial moderate reform proposals of the so-called jovellanists (Antonio de Capmany) were overwhelmed, the Cadiz deputies were politically divided into two tendencies: liberals and absolutists. The predominance of the liberals (Agustín Argüelles, Diego Muñoz Torrero, the Count of Toreno) determined the orientation of their legislative work towards the institutional dismantling of the — and the construction of a liberal State (suppression of the seigniories and the Inquisition, freedom of the press, drafting of the constitution of 1812). One of the absolutist deputies, the Bishop of Orense Pedro de Quevedo y Quintano, was sanctioned for protesting during the oath to the Constitution.

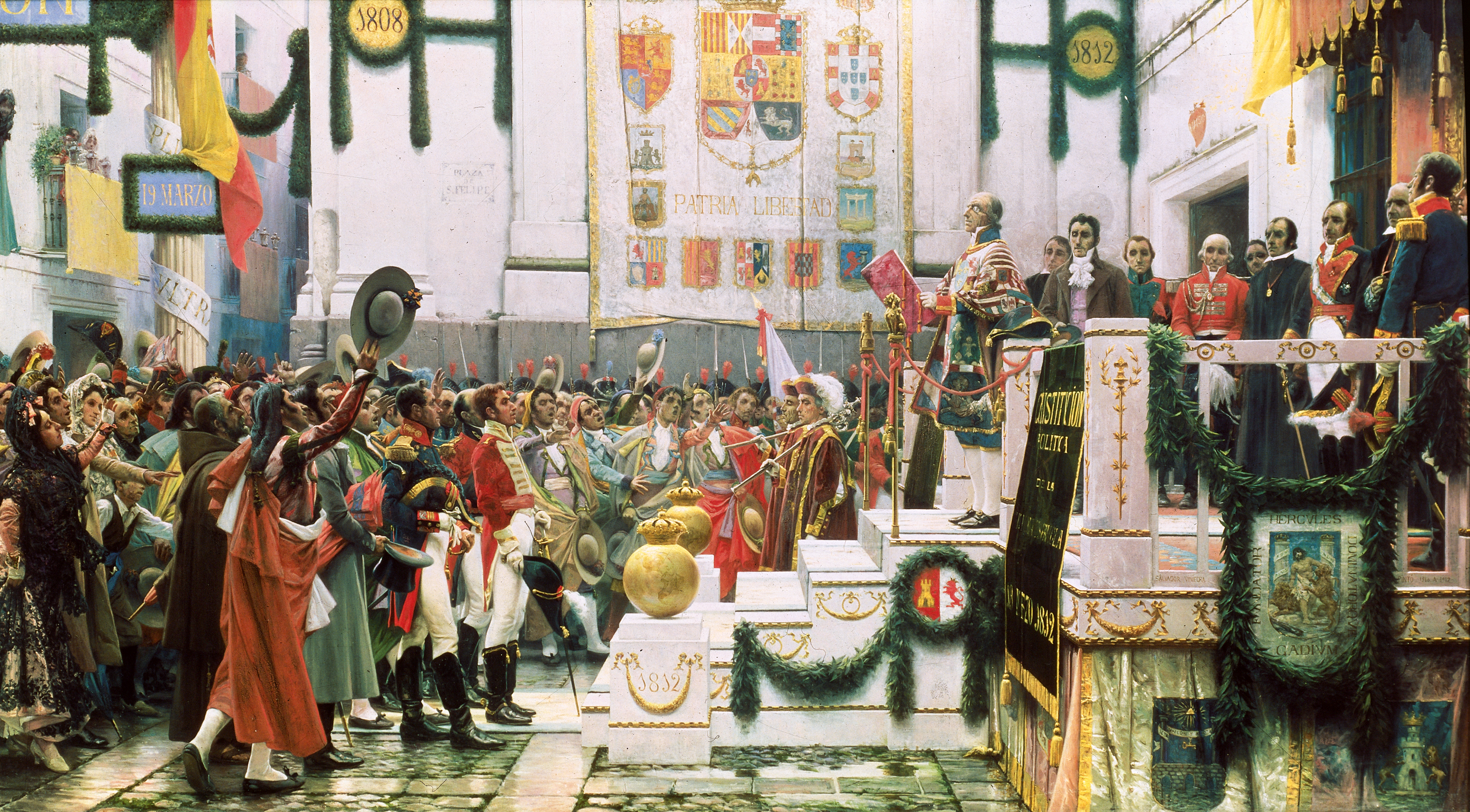
The deputies swear the Constitution on 19 March 1812, in the Hall of the Cortes of Cadiz. History painting by Salvador Viniegra, 1912.

Among the presidents of the Cortes were Muñoz Torrero, Ramón Lázaro de Dou, Jaime Creus Martí (who would later preside over the absolutist Urgel Regency), Miguel Antonio de Zumalacárregui (brother of the later Carlist leader) and several representatives of the Spanish Americans, such as Antonio Joaquín Pérez Martínez (who intervened in the later independence of Mexico).

The word "liberal", which was born in the Cadiz debates, spread to the international political vocabulary.

=== Courts of the Trienio Liberal ===
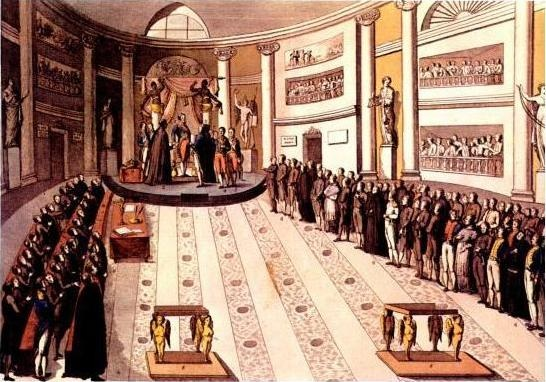
Ferdinand VII swears the Constitution of Cadiz before the Cortes of the Trienio gathered at the Colegio de María de Aragón, Madrid, 1820.

The Pronunciamiento of Riego (in Cabezas de San Juan, 1 January 1820) put an end to the first absolutist period of Ferdinand VII, who shortly after returning to Spain had dissolved the Cortes and declared the Cadiz legislation null and void (4 May 1814). Once the constitution of 1812 was reestablished, the Cortes were reconvened. The new Cortes of the Trienio Liberal met in Madrid, in the same building of the Colegio de doña María de Aragón, between 1820 and 1823. There were two convocations (1820 and 1822) in which the deputies were elected with the current constitutional criteria (universal male indirect suffrage and the same constituencies, including the representation of the American Spaniards, whose territory was in the midst of a war for independence). They had a brief and agitated life, characterized by internal confrontations between doceañistas and veinteañistas liberals. Among the presidents of the Cortes were José de Espiga (who presided over the inaugural session and the swearing in of the king in 1820), Rafael del Riego himself (those of 1822), José María Calatrava, Miguel Ricardo de Álava, Manuel Flores Calderón, Francisco Martínez de la Rosa and the Count of Toreno.

Given the distrust between king and Cortes, the latter exercised power in practice, without taking into account the executive powers of the monarch, whom the foreign powers considered a prisoner (as had happened in the French Revolution with Louis XVI). The matter of the diplomatic notes issued was submitted to the Cortes for deliberation; when they were rejected by both the Congress and the Government, they gave reason to the powers of the Holy Alliance to intervene in defense of royal absolutism and to commission France to invade Spain with the Hundred Thousand Sons of Saint Louis. The Cortes left Madrid on 23 May 1823, withdrawing first to Seville and then to Cadiz, forcing the king to accompany them; until the military defeat was evident (battle of Trocadero), and with it its dissolution and the return to power of Fernando VII as absolute king (23 September 1823) for the next ten years (Ominous Decade).

=== Last Cortes of the Ancien Régime ===
The Cortes of Madrid of 1833 were the last ones convened with the criteria of the Ancien Régime. Appealing to the old customs and laws of Castile, Fernando VII summoned the Cortes to swear in his daughter Isabel (the future Isabella II of Spain) as Princess of Asturias. Gathered in the Church of Saint Jerome the Royal, they took the oath. In the context of the end of his reign, when the rapprochement between the more moderate elements of the absolutists and the liberals was taking place, this convocation was seen as a symptom of political openness, which was confirmed in the following period.

=== Parliamentarism of the Isabelline period ===
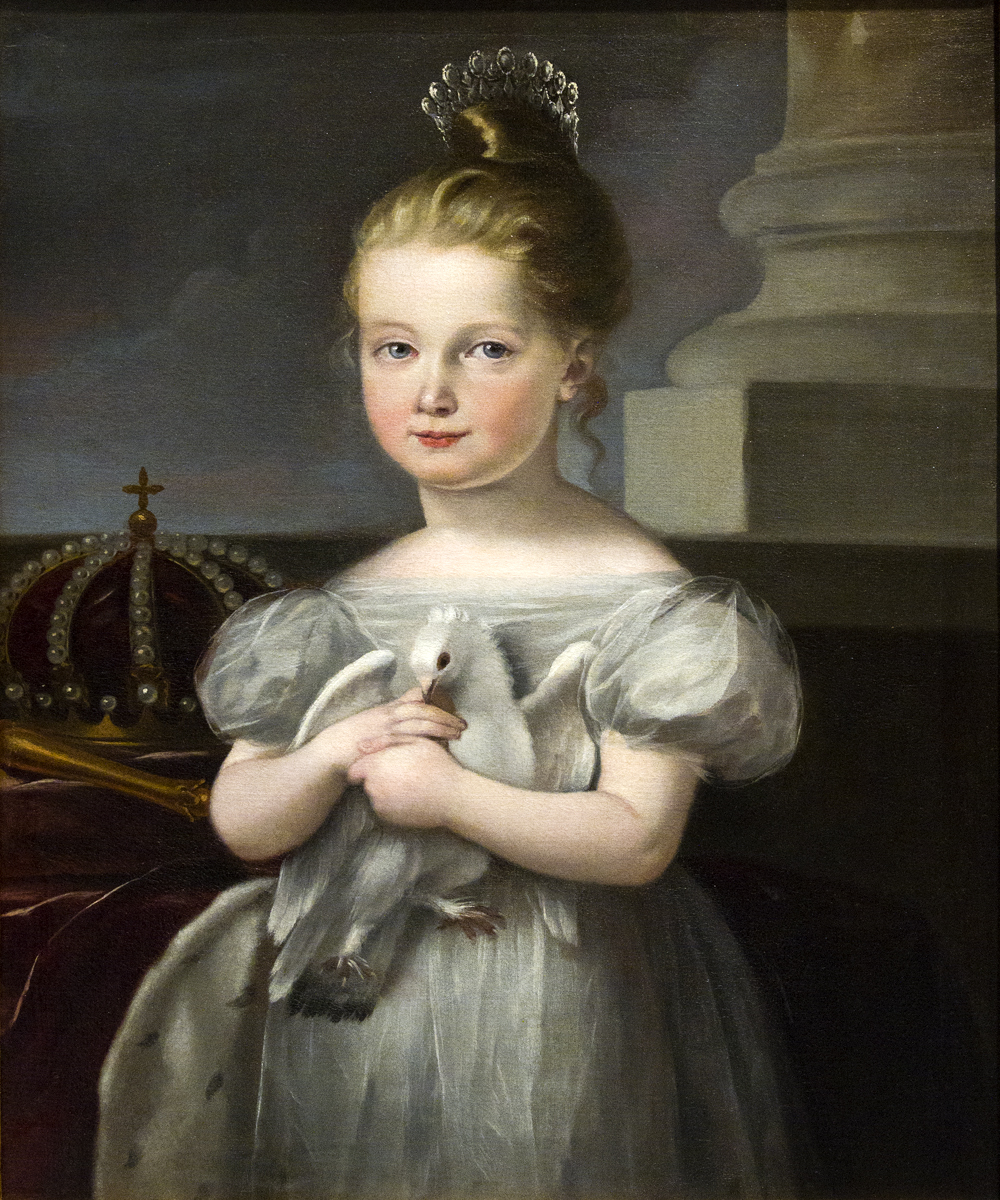
Isabella II, child, by José de Madrazo

The Cortes of Madrid of 1834, under the regency of Maria Christina, were convened by means of a Royal Statute for the convocation of the general Cortes of the Kingdom, a quasi-constitutional text (of the type of carta otorgada) under whose conditions the parliamentary life of the reign of Isabella II began, in the midst of the first Carlist war and characterized by the alternation in power, through pronunciamiento of military men linked to political groups (the so-called "espadones" or "ayacuchos"), of moderate and progressive liberals. The electoral system was based on the census suffrage, which restricted the vote to those who had a well-to-do social position, and there was a change from indirect election to direct election of deputies.

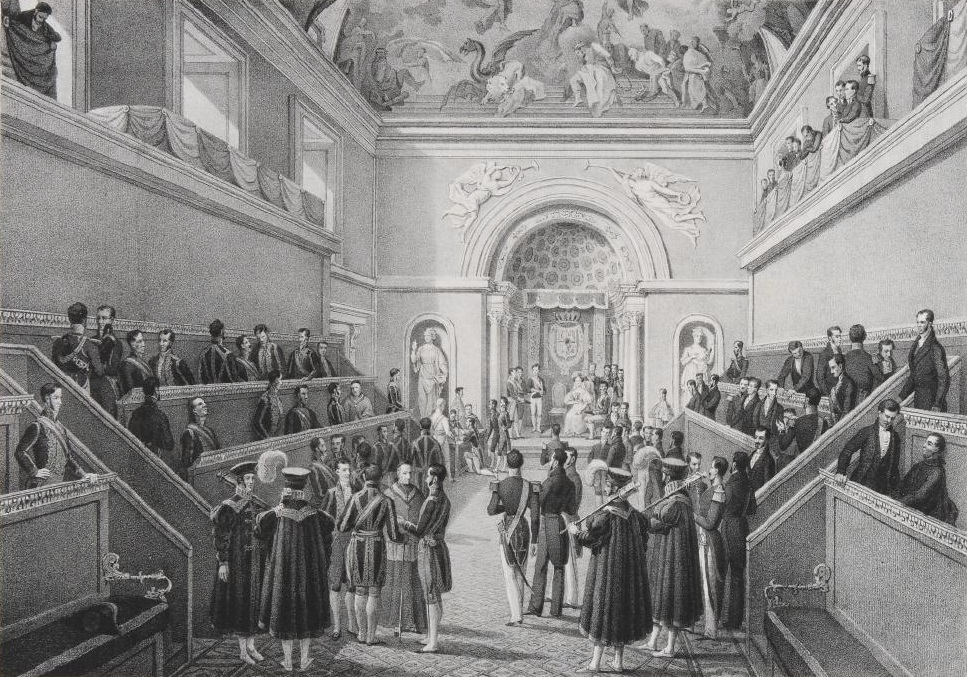
Spanish State opening of Parliament 1834 in the Casón del Buen Retiro

The loss of the colonies, except for Cuba and the Philippines, meant that deputies from the American continent no longer came. Seeking similarity with British parliamentarism, a bicameral system was established, with the Cortes divided into two chambers: the lower chamber or Estamento de Procuradores (which ended up being called the Congress of Deputies) and the upper chamber or House of Peers (which ended up being called the Senate). The Proceres met in the former building of the Cortes (the Colegio de doña María de Aragón), and the Procuradores in the Convento del Espíritu Santo (in the Carrera de San Jerónimo, whose building was profoundly reformed by Narciso Pascual between 1843 and 1850, with a neoclassical façade with colonnade and pediment —Palacio de las Cortes—).

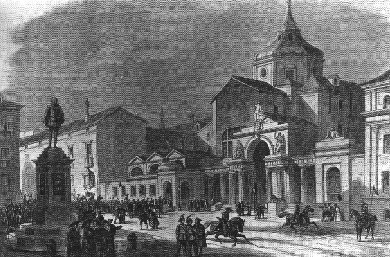
Exterior of the Congreso de los Diputados before the construction of the current facade (colonnade and classical pediment, and the lions). The statue of Cervantes is already erected on the other side of the Carrera de San Jerónimo.

There were convocations of Cortes in 1835 and 1836. Given the new political context, which assumed the convening of the Cortes in the capital of the kingdom, they are no longer called "Cortes de Madrid" in any text; although article 19 of the Statute provided that the procurators of the Kingdom would meet in the town designated by the Royal Convocation to hold the Cortes.

The uprising of the sergeants of La Granja (1836) proclaimed once again the Constitution of 1812 and produced the dissolution of the statutory Cortes. The new constituent Cortes of 1836-1837 elaborated a new text that responded to the criteria of the progressive liberals (Spanish Constitution of 1837).

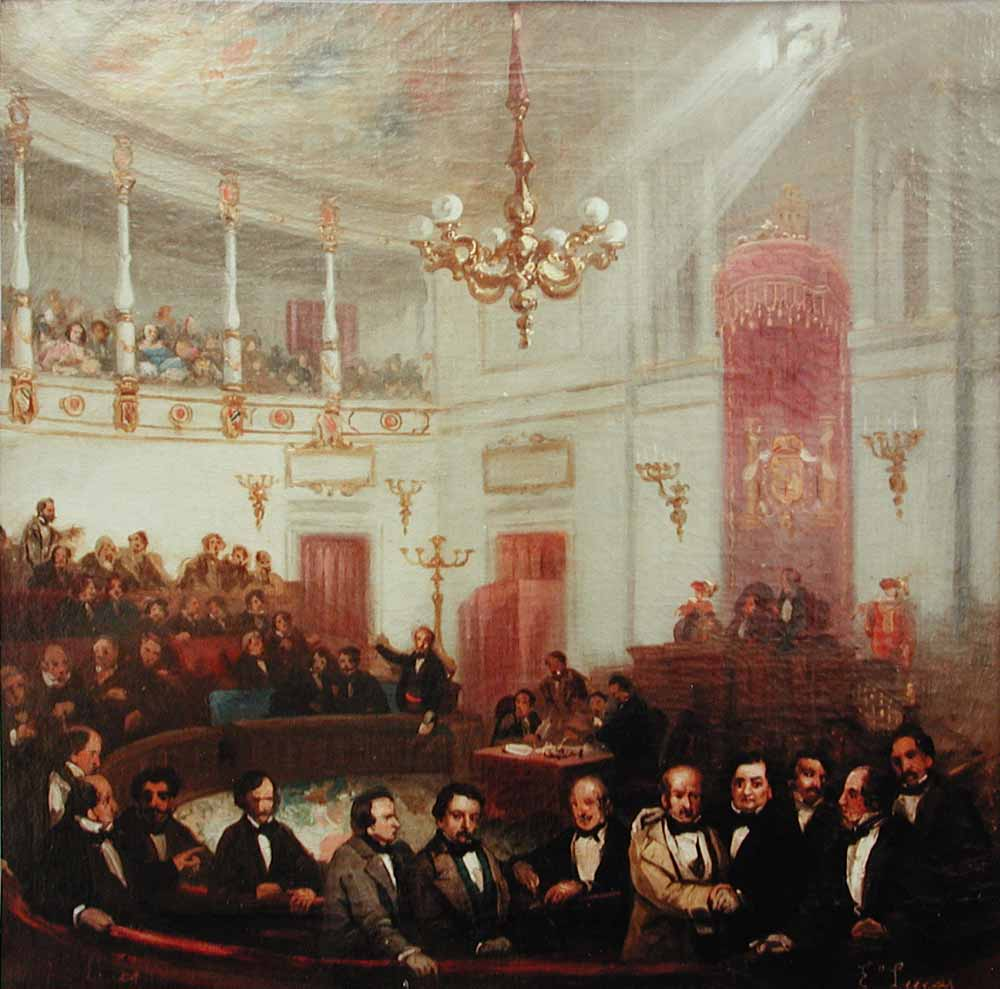
The hemicycle of the Congress of Deputies circa 1854–1855. Painting by Eugenio Lucas Velázquez.

The Cortes of 1840 institutionally redirected the liberal revolution, elaborating among others the Law of Town Halls, which was approved and sanctioned by the Crown. When it was about to be put into effect, Espartero's pronouncement took place, which led to the banishment of the queen governor and made him the new regent.

In 1841, 1842 and 1843 Cortes were convened by the regency of Espartero. The growing opposition to his government finally led to his resignation and departure from Spain. The Cortes declared the young queen of legal age (only 13 years old), to the cry of Salustiano Olózaga: God save the queen, God save the country.

The Cortes of 1845, dominated by the moderates, reformed the constitutional text in a conservative sense (Spanish Constitution of 1845).

The period between 1845 and 1855, dominated by General Narváez, is known as the Década moderada. Among the most prominent speakers of the time was Donoso Cortés.

The progressives dominated the Cortes of 1854, convened after the Vicalvarada and the Manifesto of Manzanares, and which subsisted during the so-called Bienio Progresista (1854-1856). They drafted a new constitutional text that did not enter into force (it would have been the Spanish Constitution of 1856). The same General O'Donnell, who had brought about the beginning of the biennium, provoked its end, dissolving the Cortes on 2 September 1856.

A prolonged period of parliamentary predominance of the Liberal Union began, in which O'Donnel alternated in government with the moderates of Narváez, between the Cortes of 1858 and the Cortes of 1866. In the Cortes of 1867 the moderate predominance left practically no parliamentary representation to the Unionists, thus diminishing the political base of the regime, in the midst of a growing opposition, which organized itself outside the system (night of San Daniel, Pact of Ostende). The maintenance in power of Luis González Bravo was done at the cost of increasing political repression to unbearable extremes, which justified the revolution.

=== Cortes of the Sexenio Democrático ===
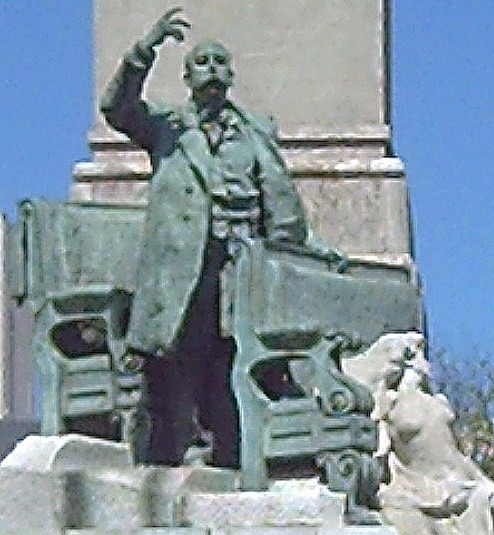
Emilio Castelar is represented addressing the Cortes from his seat, in the monument of the Paseo de la Castellana in Madrid (sculptor Mariano Benlliure).

After the revolution of 1868, which sent Isabel II into exile, the Cortes of 1869 elaborated the Spanish Constitution of 1869, with democratic criteria (universal male suffrage).

The Cortes of 1872-1873 experimented a republican system (First Spanish Republic) after the abdication of the ephemeral King Amadeus I of Savoy. The coup d'état of Pavia (3 January 1874), which violently broke into the Cortes, and the subsequent dictatorship of Serrano, suspended the democratic institutional life.

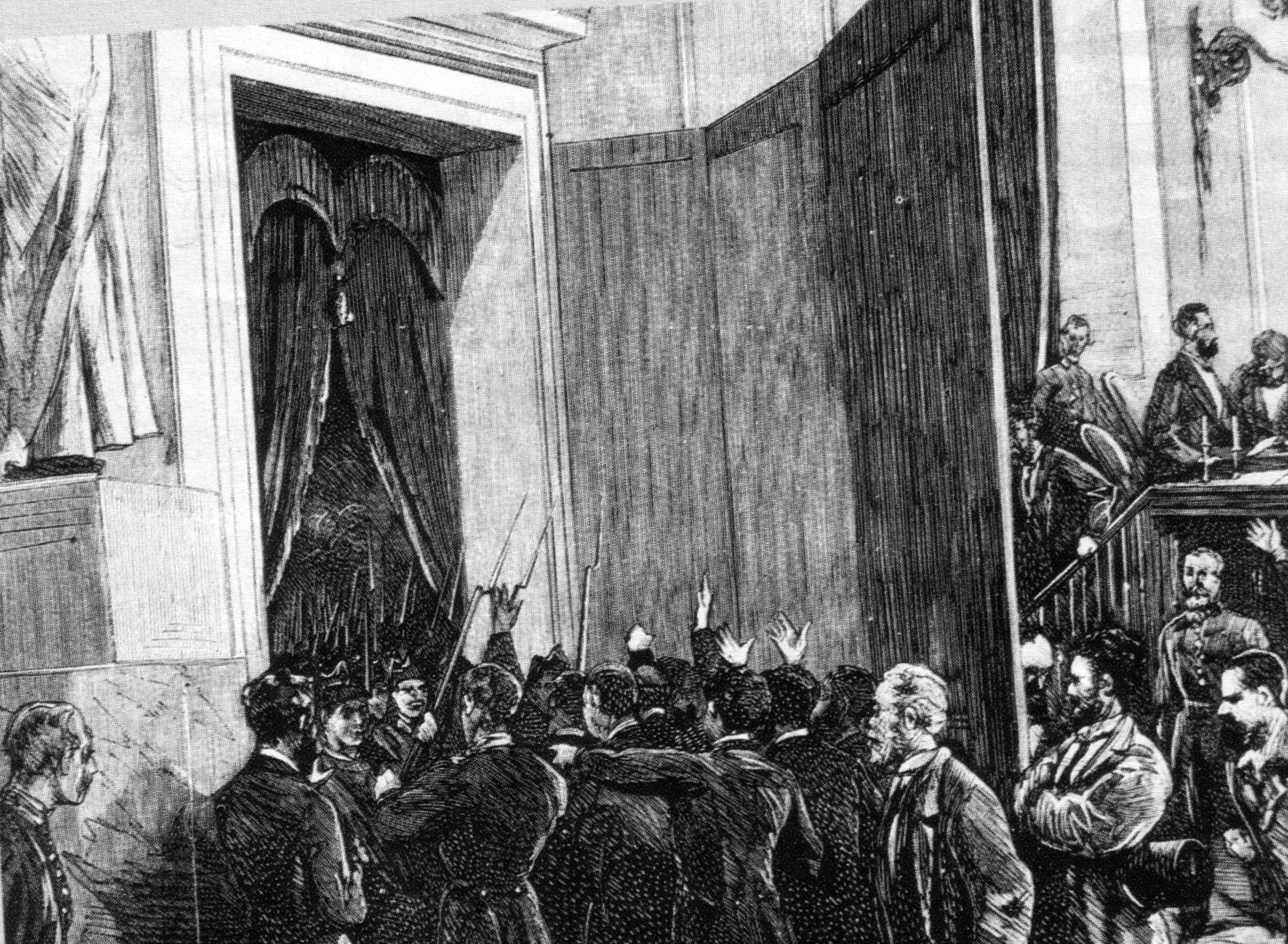
Contemporary engraving in which the deputies are represented resisting to the entrance of the troops of Pavia in the hemicycle of the Cortes, 3 January 1874. Most of the deputies left hastily (some through the windows, before the mockery of Pavia himself). A small group, including Emilio Castelar, were forcibly removed. What there was no spectacular entrance "on horseback", although this mix-up has become very popular, linking the image of that "Espadón" to that of another famous for his horse: Espartero. A very similar image was repeated on February 23, 1981, with the entry of Colonel Tejero into the Cortes.

The pronunciamiento de Martínez Campos (29 December 1874) imposed the restoration of the monarchy on the son of Isabel II, Alfonso XII.

During the parliamentary debates of the six-year period, Emilio Castelar's interventions made his name synonymous with orator.

=== Restoration parliamentarism ===
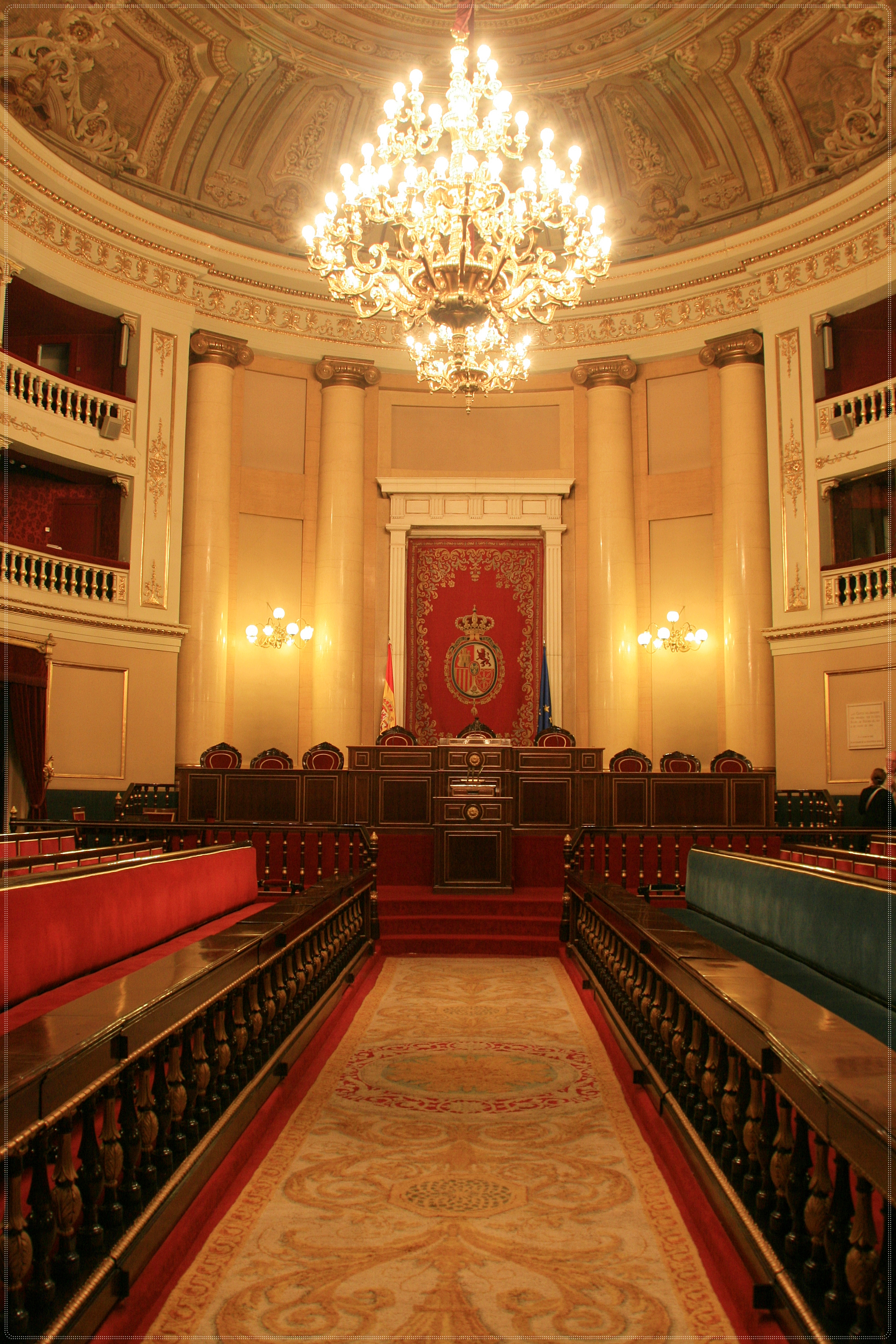
Former plenary room of the Senate.

After an initial period of total predominance of the Liberal-Conservative Party of Antonio Cánovas del Castillo, after the Pact of El Pardo (24 November 1885) the political life of the Restoration was characterized by turnism, the alternation in power of the conservatives with the Liberal-Progressive Party of Práxedes Mateo Sagasta. When the time came, the government of the day resigned, the king (or the queen regent) called the leader of the opposition to form a new government, and the latter called elections, conveniently directed from the Ministry of home affairs, which activated the local networks of the caciquism to obtain a parliamentary majority, using all kinds of ingenious subterfuges (pucherazo).

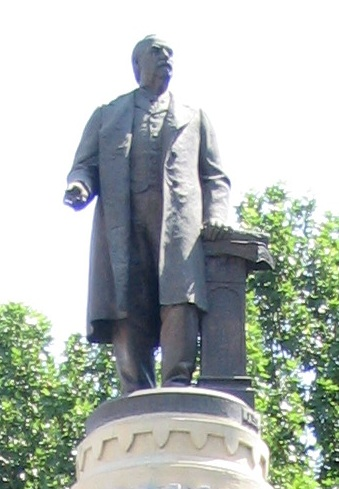
Antonio Cánovas del Castillo in speaker's pose. Monument in front of the Senate.

The political system of the Restoration was strongly criticized, especially since the disaster of 1898, when people began to speak of "regenerationism" (Joaquín Costa, Oligarquía y caciquismo, Gumersindo de Azcárate, El régimen parlamentario en la práctica). Nevertheless, turnism continued to function uninterruptedly until the crisis of 1917, after which it became increasingly difficult to compose such majorities. The political system lived in crisis until Primo de Rivera's coup d'état (13 September 1923), which among other things was a way to avoid the scandal of the parliamentary investigation of the Annual disaster of 1921 (Picasso report of 1922–1923).

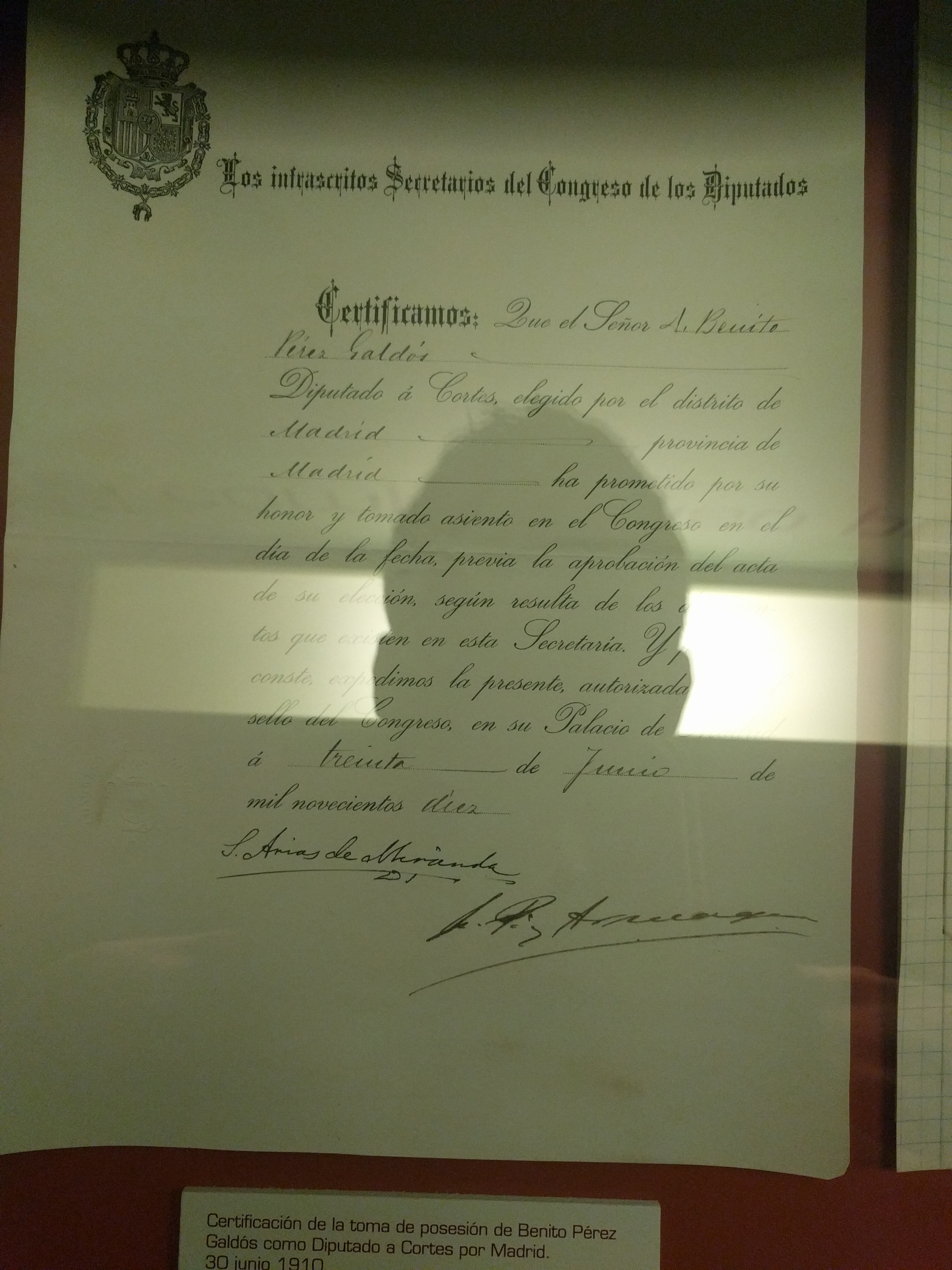
Certificate of the inauguration of Benito Pérez Galdós as deputy in 1910 for Madrid.

The Constitution of 1876, which did not recognize national sovereignty (it established it as shared between the Cortes and the King) nor did it pronounce itself on the nature of suffrage, was flexible enough to allow the Cortes of the Restoration to introduce universal male suffrage (from 1890) or the abolition of slavery (a recurring theme in Spanish parliamentarism), which the Cortes of Cadiz in 1811 raised unsuccessfully, was reattempted by the Cortes of the Sexenio —the Moret or freedom of wombs law of 1870— and was not completed until the Cortes of the Restoration, in 1880-1886 —despite the opposition of the pressure group or "negrero party" closely linked to Cánovas himself—).

As long as the system worked, no "non-dynastic" party (Carlists, Republicans, workers' movement, peripheral nationalists) could aspire to political participation. As notable exceptions were the obtaining of a deputy's seat by Pablo Iglesias (1910) or the electoral success of the Lliga Regionalista (1901), in both cases in strongly urbanized and industrialized constituencies, less influenced by the caciquismo.

== 20th and 21st centuries ==
=== Pseudo-parliamentarism of the Primo de Rivera dictatorship ===
After a first period in which, with the Constitution suspended, he presented his government as a provisional dictatorship, General Primo de Rivera decided to institutionalize his regime, creating a pseudo-parliament called the National Consultative Assembly, legitimized by a plebiscite (there were neither elections nor a plurality of parties, operating a sort of single party called the Patriotic Union). It held its meetings in the Palacio de la Carrera de San Jerónimo between 1927 and 1930.

=== Parliamentarism of the Second Republic ===
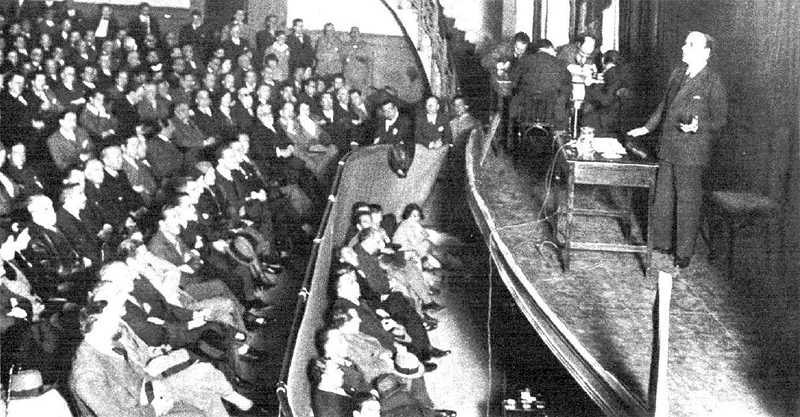
José Ortega y Gasset gives his lecture Rectification of the Republic at the Ateneo de Madrid, December 6, 1931. The Ateneo, founded in 1820 and refounded in 1835, was since its creation an alternative meeting place where parliamentarians could relax and socialize with each other and with people from very different areas of Madrid's culture and society. Since 1884 it has occupied premises very close to the Palacio de las Cortes.

The Constituent Courts elected in 1931 drafted the Constitution of the Second Spanish Republic, which established a unicameral parliament, called the Congress of Deputies. They included intellectuals of the stature of José Ortega y Gasset or Gregorio Marañón (Agrupación al Servicio de la República), Niceto Alcalá Zamora (Liberal Republican Right), Julián Besteiro or Fernando de los Ríos (PSOE) and, standing out as a political orator, Manuel Azaña. Parliamentary oratory reached its highest historical level with debates such as the recognition of the right to autonomy of the regions (a problem that Ortega considered unsolvable, coining the concept of "conllevancia") or that of women's suffrage (between Clara Campoamor and Victoria Kent). The parliamentary control of the government was sufficiently effective to bring about its fall due to the events of Casas Viejas.

The brilliant oratorical moments were not exclusive of the left-wing majority: the agrarian José María Lamamie de Clairac, opposed to any kind of agrarian reform, was reproached, in the middle of a parliamentary debate, for not even accepting the catholic social teaching established in the papal encyclicals, to which he replied: If the encyclicals strip me, I will become a schismatic. The religious problem was addressed by Azaña with a speech whose lapidary phrase "Spain has ceased to be Catholic" has gone down in history. Ortega left his seat in December 1931 (Rectification of the Republic).

In the following periods (Cortes of 1933 and Cortes of 1936), political representation became increasingly polarized between two increasingly separate blocs, until reaching limits such as the disastrous dialogue between La Pasionaria and José Calvo Sotelo in July 1936, a verbal prelude to the confrontation of the Spanish Civil War.

==== Spanish Civil War ====
Given the critical situation in Madrid, the Republican government and the Cortes moved to Valencia. With the war practically lost, they held their last session in Figueres in Spanish territory (February 1939).

In the rebel side there was no parliamentary institution of any kind, all political parties were banned, including the related ones, which were forced to unify in Falange Española Tradicionalista y de las Juntas de Ofensiva Nacional Sindicalista (the political branch of the so-called Movimiento Nacional).

=== Francoist Cortes ===
From 1942 onwards, the so-called Cortes Españolas functioned, which gave institutional support to Franco's personal dictatorship, especially as the initial totalitarian rhetoric was abandoned. The National Council of the Movement, which met in the former Senate Palace, gave a bicameral aspect to the political system.

=== Cortes since the return of democracy ===
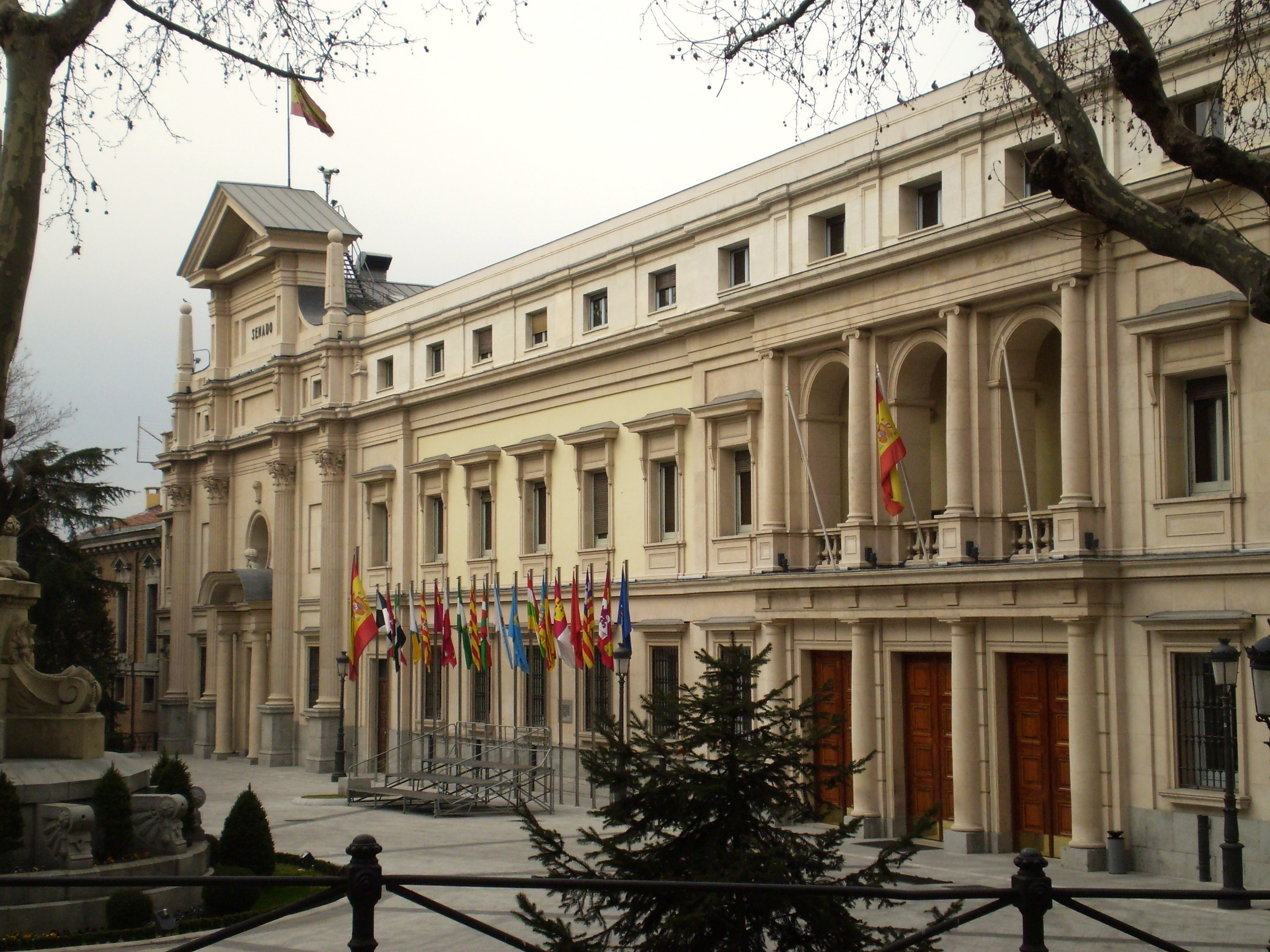
The Senate.

The 1977 elections brought to parliament several generations of politicians who had not had the opportunity to experience parliamentary life (Felipe González, Enrique Tierno, Miquel Roca, Xabier Arzallus, Josep Benet, Joaquín Satrústegui, Lluís Maria Xirinacs, Juan María Bandrés), as well as some survivors of the 1936 generation (almost all of them from the Communist Party): Santiago Carrillo, Dolores Ibárruri, the poet Rafael Alberti; José María Gil-Robles, who ran for the Christian Democracy of Joaquín Ruiz Jiménez, did not obtain any representation, nor did the extreme right) and some ex-Francoist politicians (around Manuel Fraga or Adolfo Suárez, depending on their degree of openness). The two main trade union leaders, Marcelino Camacho and Nicolás Redondo, were deputies in the first legislatures, a circumstance which did not occur again.

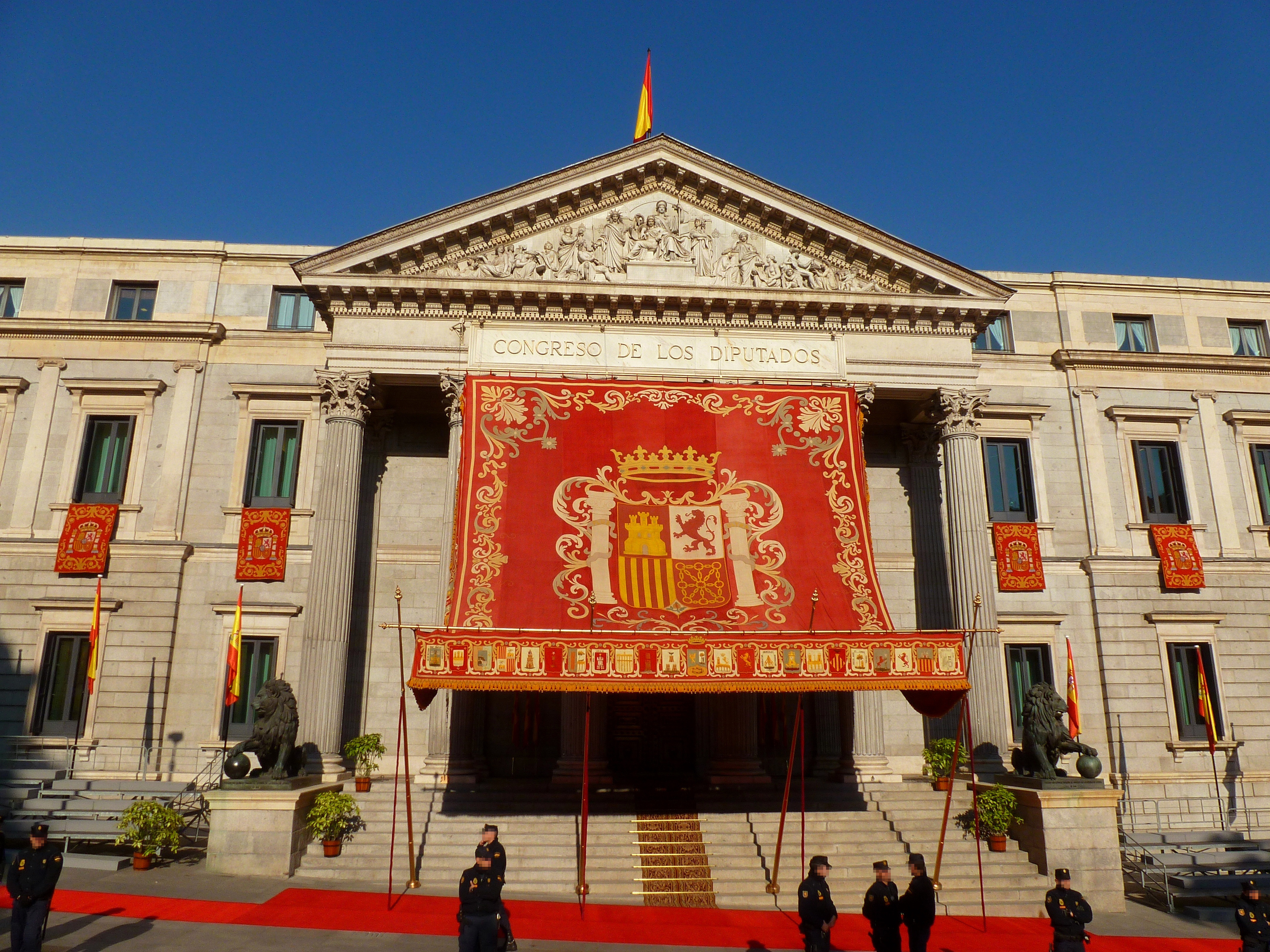
The Congress of Deputies decorated for the opening session of the 10th Legislature, December 27, 2011.

The debates in Congress and Senate for the drafting of the Spanish Constitution of 1978 were not noted for their oratorical stature or for their ability to convince one or the other parliamentarians: a voting discipline was imposed among the main political parties that made the discreet meetings held outside the hemicycle decisive, in which the political leaders reached the so-called "consensus" (as in the constitutional report or in the Moncloa pacts).

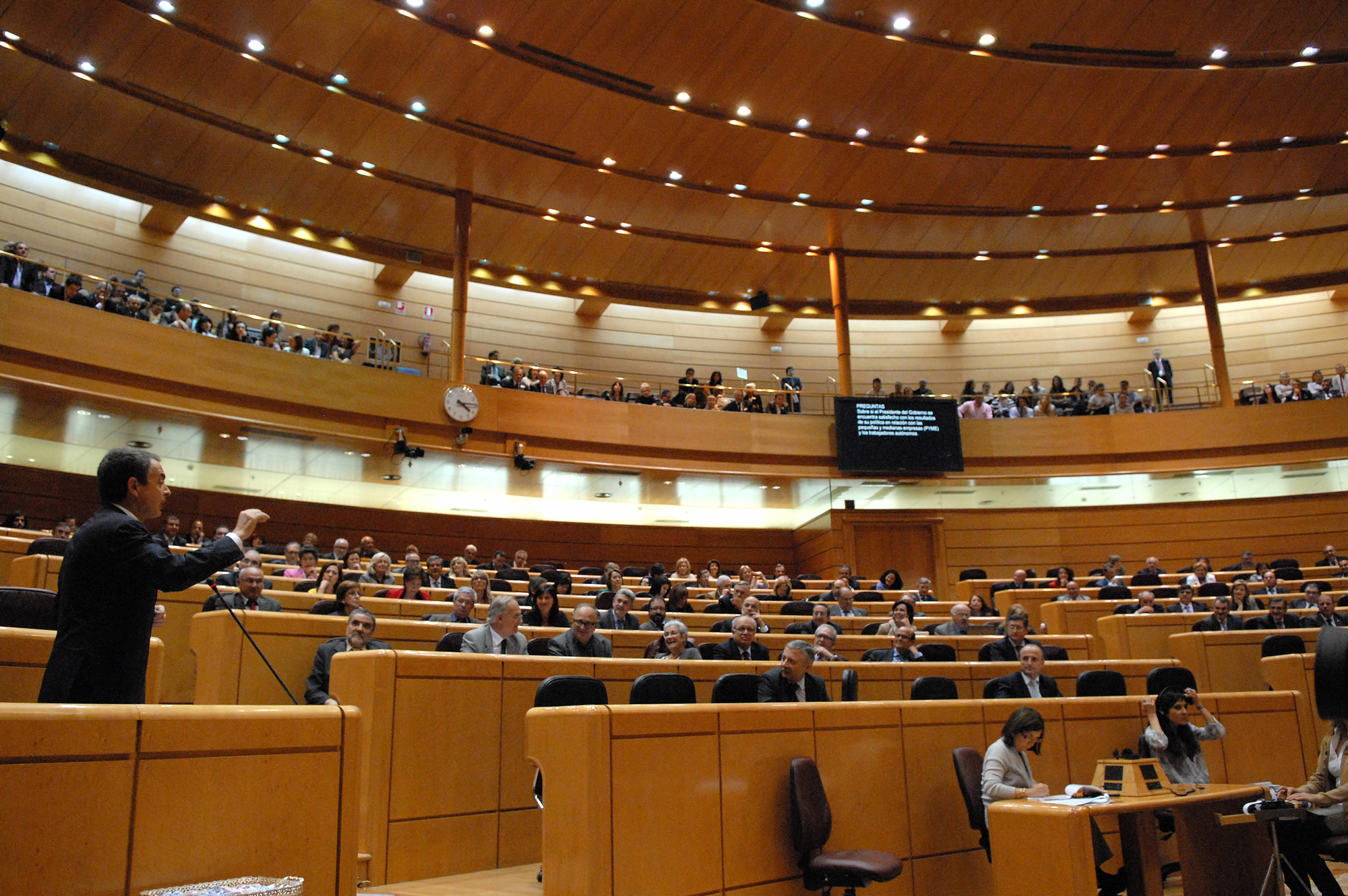
New Senate plenary room.

Since then, Spanish parliamentary life has been characterized by the predominance of the executive power: parliamentary debates are merely explanations subsequent to the position decided by the government (especially by its president, subjected to a certain withdrawal from the public space —the Moncloa syndrome) and transmitted by the parliamentary group that supports it. The possibility of presenting a motion of no confidence (presented on some occasions, one of which was successful) is the maximum possibility for the opposition to denounce the government, which is usually presented through the ordinary channels: the investiture debate at the beginning of a presidential term, the annual debate on the state of the nation, the annual budget debates, the legislative debates and the weekly control sessions with questions to the ministers or to the president.

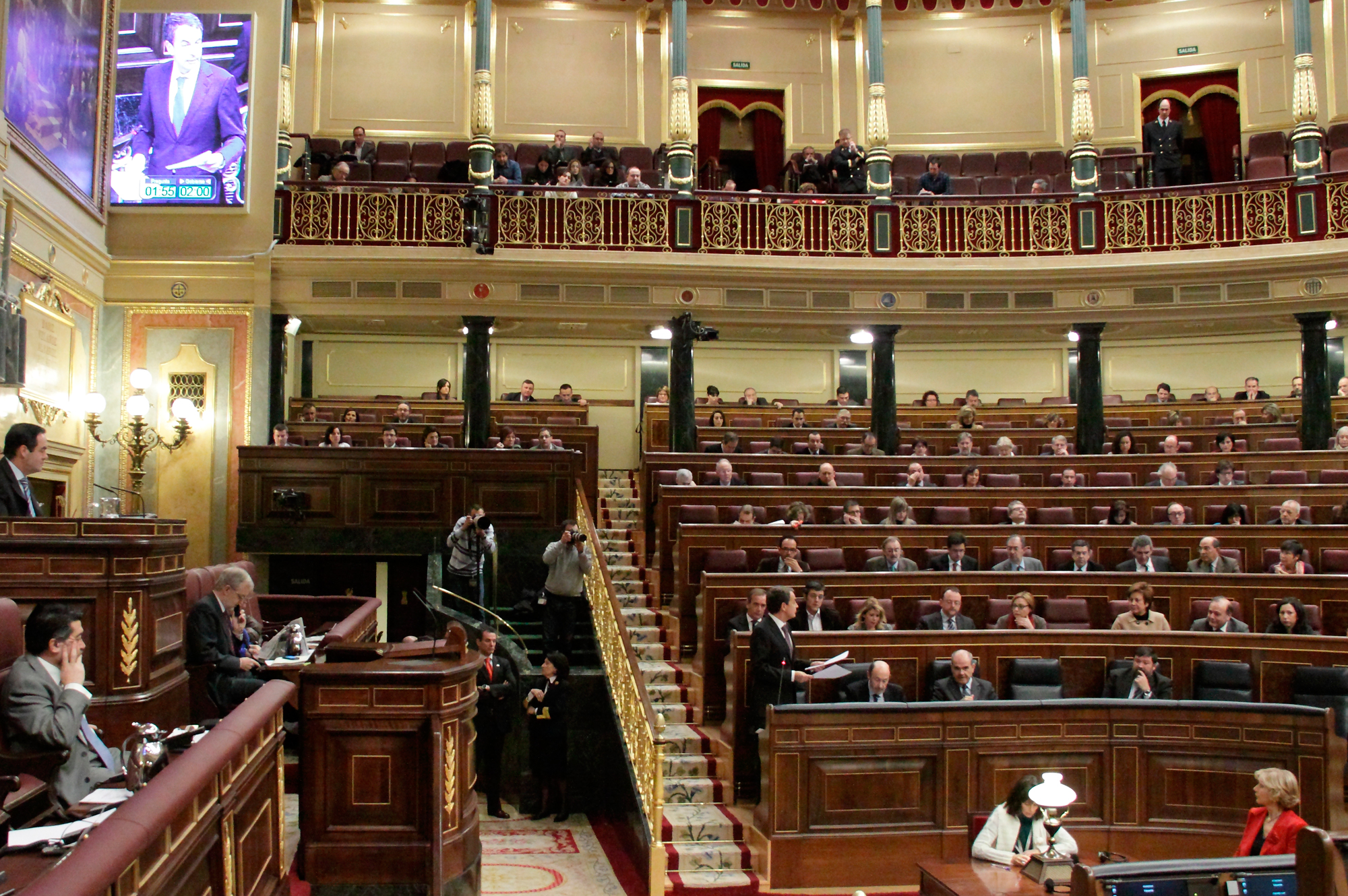
Government control session in the Congress of Deputies, 26 January 2011.

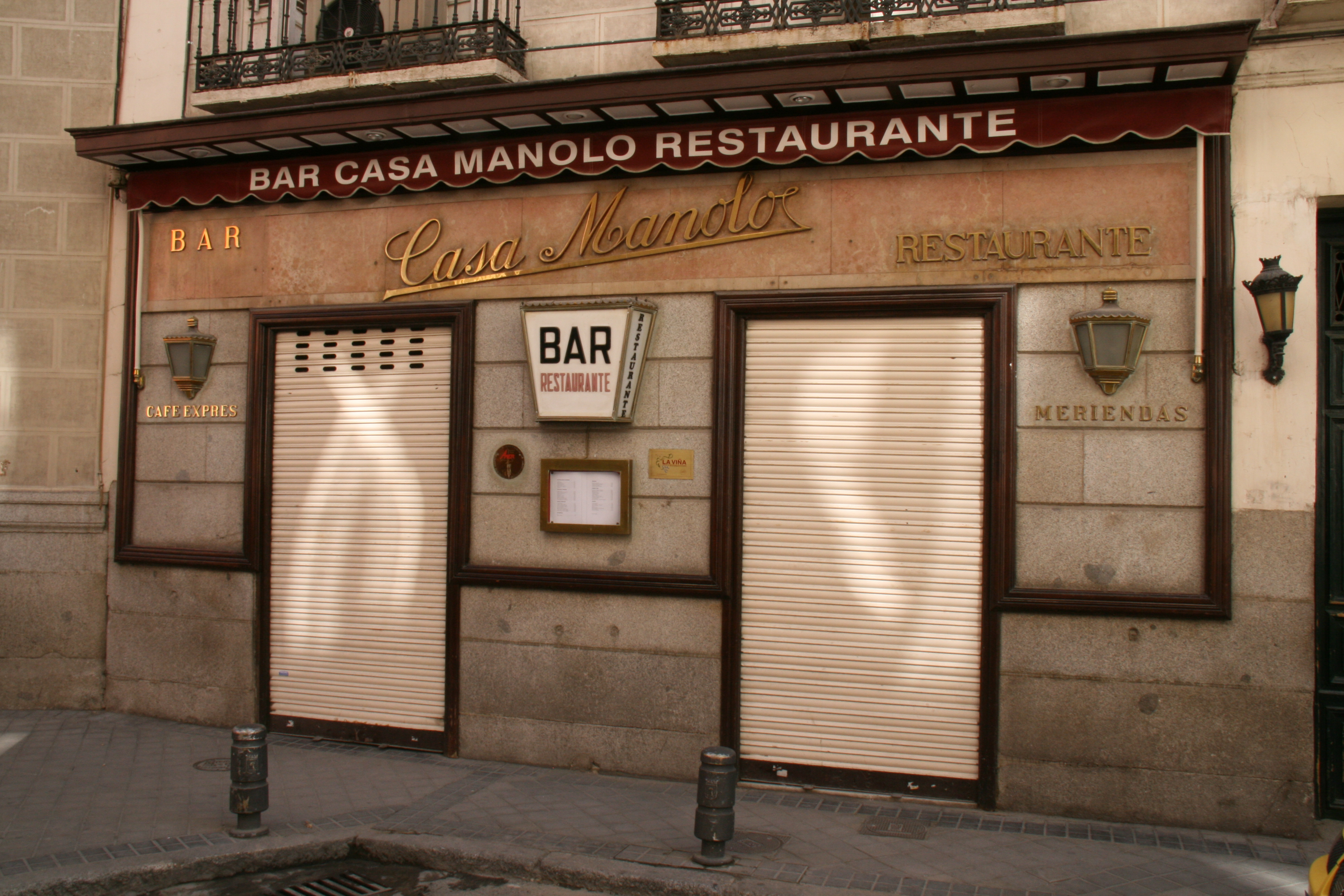
Casa Manolo, a bar located in the vicinity of the Palacio de las Cortes where deputies traditionally held relaxed meetings outside Congress. Other bars in the vicinity have also been places for political meetings, such as Lhardy or Edelweiss.

The need to revitalize the Senate, to which the Constitution reserves the role of second legislative reading and chamber of territorial representation, is periodically expressed. It was proposed to link it to the conference of autonomous presidents. The opening of the nineteen autonomous parliaments has multiplied Spanish parliamentary life, and has produced some of the episodes of greatest political tension: the Ibarretxe plan and the reform of the Statute of Catalonia. The difficult processing of appeals before the Constitutional Court and the difficulty of renewing its members have discredited this institution, which in practice functions as a "third chamber".

The proportional electoral system is characterized by closed and blocked lists and provincial constituencies. This configuration has determined, since the disappearance of the Unión of the Democratic Centre (1982), the predominance of the internal "apparatus" of the political parties, as well as an imperfect two-party system between two large national parties (People's Party and Spanish Socialist Workers' Party) and a variable number of minority groups, among which the over-representation of the peripheral nationalisms over the small parties of national scope stands out.

The most relevant moment of this period was the attempted coup d'état, through the assault on Congress during the vote for the investiture of Calvo-Sotelo, after the resignation of Adolfo Suárez.

== See also ==
- Spanish nationalism
- Category:General elections in Spain
- President of the Congress of Deputies
- President of the Senate of Spain

== Bibliography ==
=== Sources ===
- Azorín (1916). Parlamentarismo español (1904-1916) (in Spanish). Calleja: Calleja.
- Colmeiro, Manuel (1883). "Cortes de los antiguos Reinos de León y de Castilla" (in Spanish). Madrid: Sucesores de Rivadeneyra.
- Rico y Amat, Juan (1862). Historia política y parlamentaria de España (in Spanish).
- Congreso de los Diputados. "Diarios de Sesiones" (in Spanish).
- Senado. "Diarios de Sesiones" (in Spanish).
- Congreso de los Diputados. "Índice histórico de diputados" (in Spanish).
- Senado. "Lista alfabética de senadores" (in Spanish). Archived from the original on 21 April 2012.

=== Studies ===
- Cuenca Toribio, José Manuel (2002). La oratoria parlamentaria española: Una antología (in Spanish). Madrid: Centro de Estudios Políticos y Constitucionales. ISBN 84-340-1368-1.
- Sánchez, Francisco José. Retórica parlamentaria española (in Spanish). Madrid: Síntesis.
- Gómez, José. "Administración parlamentaria" (PDF) (in Spanish).
- Fernández, Claro. "Las tradiciones parlamentaria y presidencialista en la historia constitucional española - Una doble y confusa resonancia" (PDF) (in Spanish).
- García Venero, Maximiano (1946). Historia del parlamentarismo español: 1810-1833. Fuentes esenciales (in Spanish).
- Pérez García, José Miguel (23 October 1995). "El parlamentarismo español en el sexenio democrático". Hispania: Revista Española de Historia (in Spanish). 55 (189): 37–66.
- Durán, José Antonio (7 June 2010). "La eterna cuestión del Parlamentarismo español" (in Spanish). Archived from the original on 14 February 2012.

=== Complementary ===
- Cabrera, Mercedes (1998). "El Parlamento en la Restauración (1913-1923)". Con luz y taquígrafos (in Spanish). Madrid: Taurus.
- Carasa, Pedro (2008). "Las elites en Italia y en España (1850-1922)". In Zurita, Rafael; Camurri, Renato (eds.). La historia de las elites políticas en el parlamento español: de la prosopografía a la historia cultural (in Spanish). Valencia: Universitat de València. pp. 113–134.
- de Esteban, Jorge (1998). Las Constituciones de España (in Spanish). Madrid: Centro de Estudios Políticos y Constitucionales.
- Forner, Salvador (1997). "Siglos XIX y XX". Democracia, elecciones y modernización en Europa (in Spanish). Madrid: Cátedra.
- Garrigues, Jean (2003). Histoire du Parlement de 1789 à nos jours, París (in French). Armand Colin.
- López Pina, Antonio (1994). Democracia representativa y parlamentarismo: Alemania, España, Gran Bretaña e Italia (in Spanish). Madrid: Secretaría del Senado.
- Marcuello Benedicto, Juan Ignacio (1986). La práctica parlamentaria en el reinado de Isabel II (in Spanish). Madrid: Congreso de los Diputados.
- Martorell Linares, Miguel; del Rey Reguillo, Fernando (2006). "El parlamentarismo liberal y sus impugnadores". Ayer (in Spanish). 4 (63): 23–52.
- Moreno Luzón, Javier (2007). "Political clientelism, elites, and caciquismo in Restoration Spain (1875-1923)". European History Quarterly (in Spanish). 37/3 (3): 417–441. doi:10.1177/0265691407078445. S2CID 145762960.
- "Parlamento y política en la España contemporánea, número monográfico". Revista de Estudios Políticos (in Spanish) (93). 1996.
- Sánchez Beato, F. (2006). El Parlamento en las Constituciones de Europa Occidental (in Spanish). Madrid: UCM.
- Sierra, María; Zurita, Rafael; Peña, María Antonia, eds. (2006). "La representación política en la España liberal, número monográfico". Ayer (in Spanish) (61).
- Varela Ortega, José (2001). El poder de la influencia. Geografía del caciquismo en España (in Spanish). Madrid: Centro de Estudios Políticos y Constitucionales/Marcial Pons Historia.
- Varela Suanzes-Carpegna, Joaquín (2007). Política y Constitución en España (1808-1978) (in Spanish). Madrid: Centro de Estudios Políticos y Constitucionales.
