= Procurador en Cortes =

Title of a member of the Spanish parliament

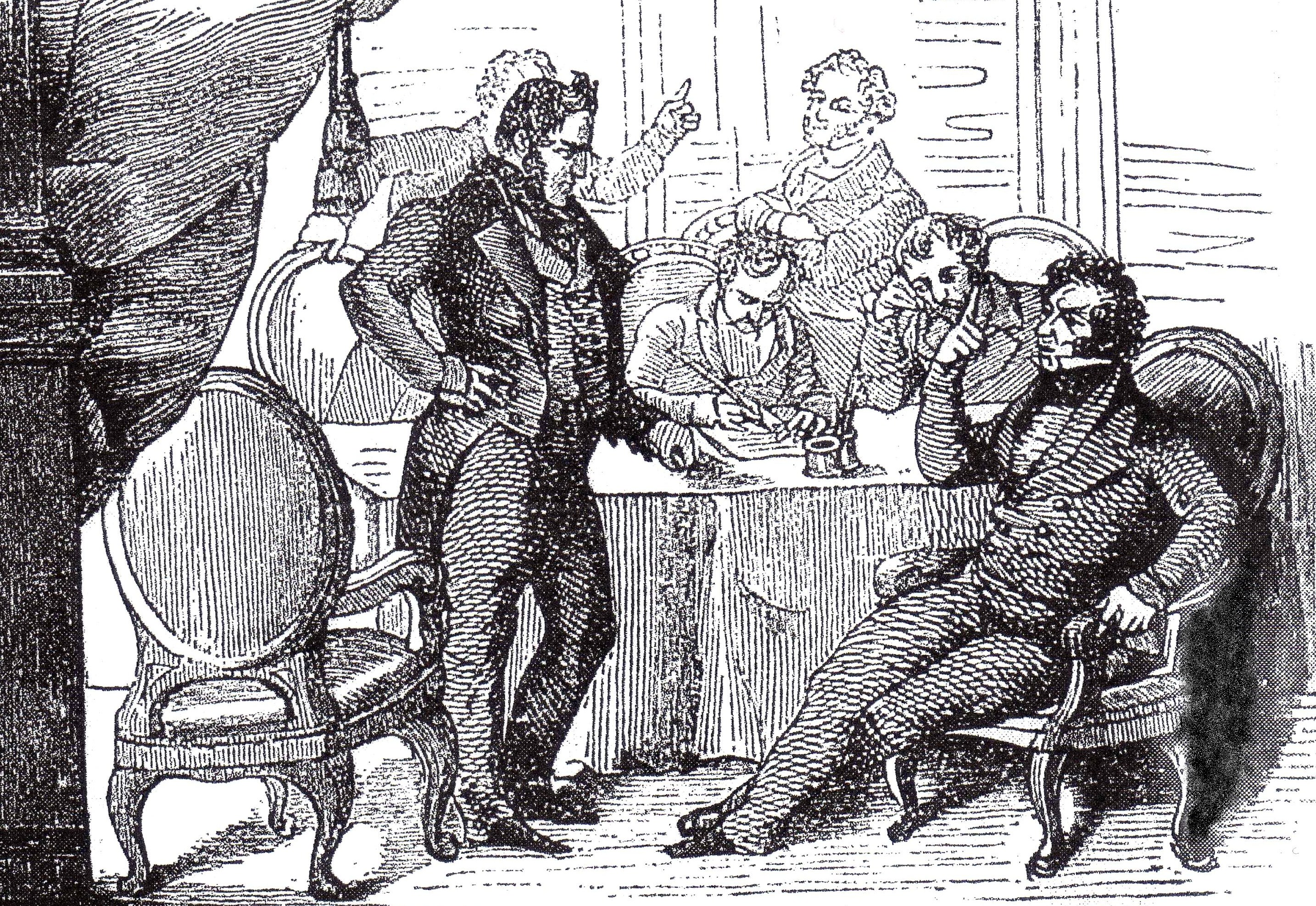
Council of Ministers during the regency of Maria Christina of the Two Sicilies. At that time, the Estamento de Procuradores was established.

Procurator in Cortes (in Spanish: Procurador en Cortes) is a term used to refer to the person elected or appointed to represent different communities in the different Cortes. In contemporary times the term was used by the Francoist Cortes (1943–1977) to differentiate itself from the liberal tradition of Spanish parliamentarism, which since the Constitution of 1812 had been using the term diputado (which was recovered when democracy was reestablished in Spain after the end of the Francoist dictatorship).

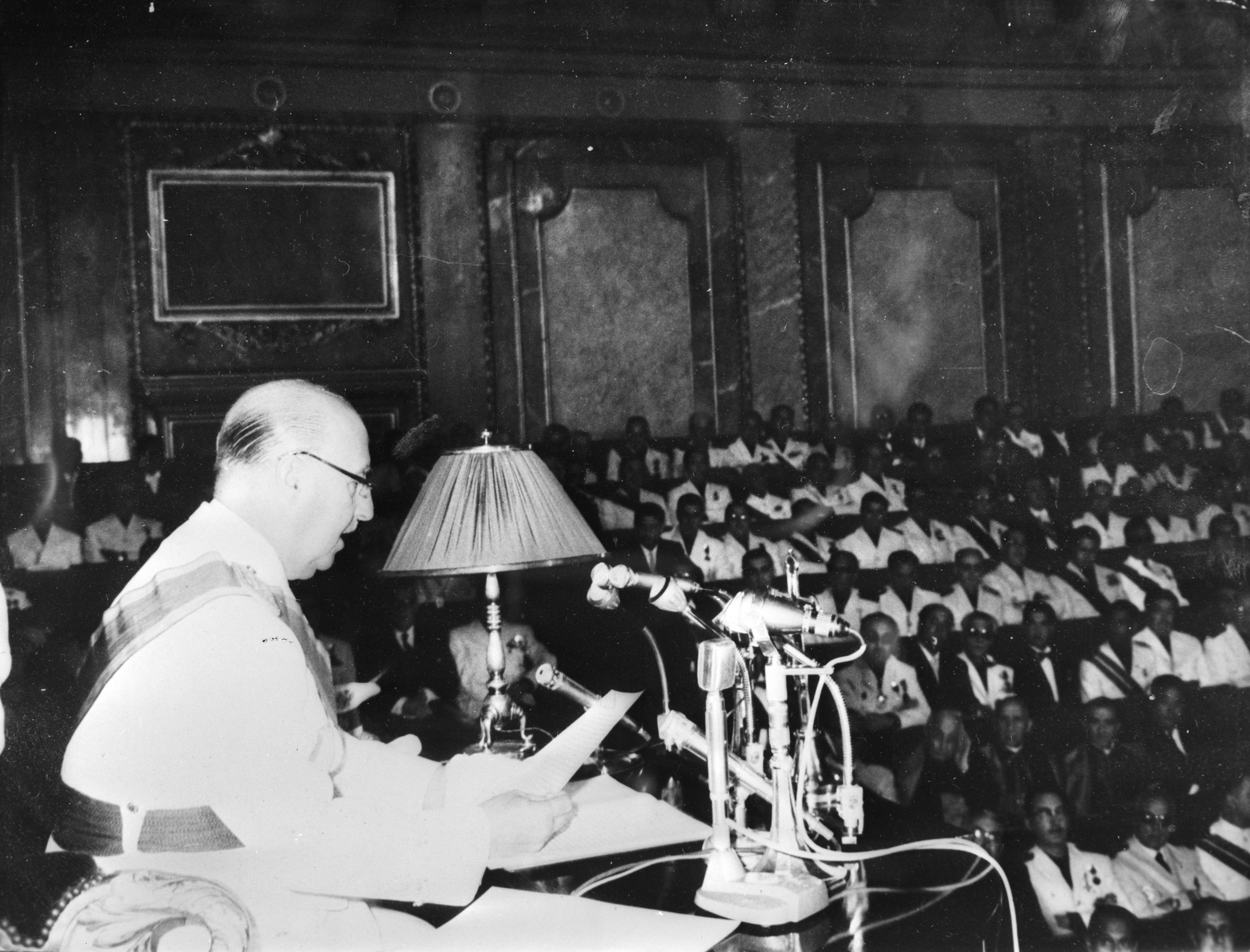
Generalissimo Francisco Franco, in the uniform of the Movement, giving a speech in the Cortes (probably on July 8, 1964, inaugurating the VIII Legislature). In the background, the procurators, also in uniform. At the bottom, three bishops, also procurators representing the Catholic Church.

In the old Cortes of Castile and, in general, in those of the Ancient Regime, the representative designated by the cities and towns was usually called "procurador" and was agglutinated in one of the three arms: ecclesiastical, nobiliary and common. The Spanish Constitution of 1812 used the term "diputados" for the members of the Cortes Generales. The Royal Statute of 1834 established the Cortes Generales del Reino, formed by the chambers called Estamento de Próceres and Estamento de Procuradores, the former of royal appointment and the latter elective. The denomination of "procurador" disappeared in the following Magna Carta, which returned the form established in the Constitution of 1812, but was recovered with the Constitutive Law of the Cortes, which established the Cortes during the Francoist regime, and which had the purpose of breaking with the liberal tradition. Once again, the term "procurador" disappears from the Spanish Constitution of 1978, being replaced by "diputado" and "senador".

The 1983 Statute of Autonomy of Castilla y León adopted the traditional name of "procurador" for the members of the modern Cortes of Castilla and León, the seat of the legislative power of the community. This is also the name given to the members of the current Juntas Generales de Álava, the legislative body of the province and historical territory of Álava.

== See also ==
- Spanish parliamentarism
