= Evaristo Gómez Sánchez y Benavides =

Peruvian politician

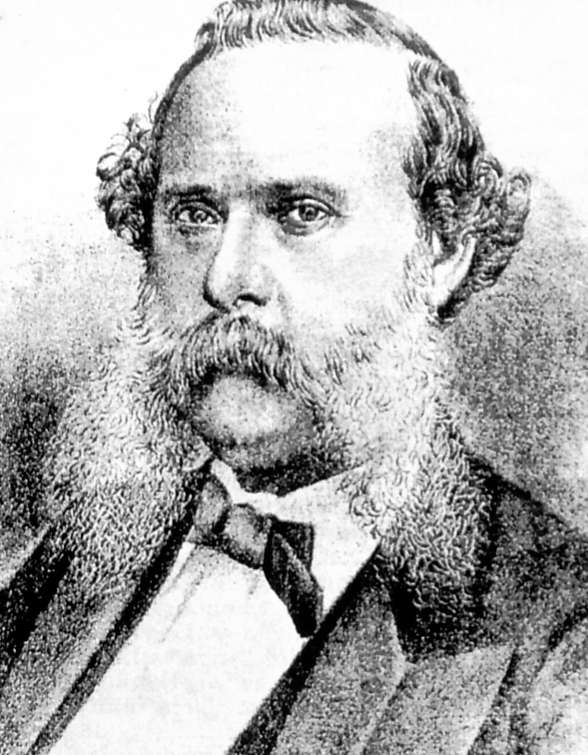
- Born: 1826; Lima, Peru
- Died: 1893; Lima, Peru
- Occupation(s): Politician, lawyer, diplomat
- Spouses: María Josefa de la Llosa y Benavides; Isabel Rodamonte Ortega
- Parents: Evaristo Tadeo Gómez Sánchez (father); María Paula del Carmen de Benavides y Corzo (mother)

Evaristo Gómez Sánchez y Benavides (1826 – 1893) was a Peruvian politician, lawyer and diplomat. He served as Minister of Government, Police, and Public Works (1864 – 1865).

== Life ==
Sánchez studied at the San Carlos Convictory and received his law degree in 1846. In 1850 he became a rapporteur of the Superior Court of Arequipa. In 1851 he was elected deputy for Camaná, and returned to live in Lima. That year he was sent to the Empire of Brazil as minister plenipotentiary to carry out the exchange of ratifications of the Convention on Boundaries & Commerce and River Navigation. Upon returning to Peru, he resumed his parliamentary function and attended the legislature of 1853. After this, he assumed the role of rector of the San Carlos Convictory.

He was a member of the Constituent Congress of 1860 for the province of Anta between July and November 1860 during the third government of Ramón Castilla. This congress drafted the Constitution of 1860, the seventh to govern the country and the one that remained in force, with some intervals, until 1920. After the constitution was issued, the congress remained as an ordinary congress until 1863 and was elected again in 1864.

In 1860 he was part of the commission in charge of drafting the Penal Codes and Procedures in Criminal Matters. During the government of General Juan Antonio Pezet he was appointed Minister of Government, in the midst of an international crisis caused by the presence of the Spanish Squadron in South American waters. He led this ministry from October 14, 1864, until November 5, 1865, when the rebellion against Pezet led by Colonel Mariano Ignacio Prado took place. Together with the overthrown president, he took refuge on the British ship Shear Water, anchored in Callao.

Exiled, he returned to Peru in 1868, and was elected senator for the department of Arequipa that same year. He was a member of the permanent committee of Congress (1868–1872). He was re-elected in 1872 and served as senator until 1876.

At the start of the Pacific War he was accredited as plenipotentiary minister in Buenos Aires, Montevideo and Asunción, between 1880 and 1882.

== See also ==
- Peruvian Constitution of 1860
- General Juan Antonio Pezet
- Colonel Mariano Ignacio Prado
