= Palacio del Senado =

Palace of the Senate
- Palacio del Senado
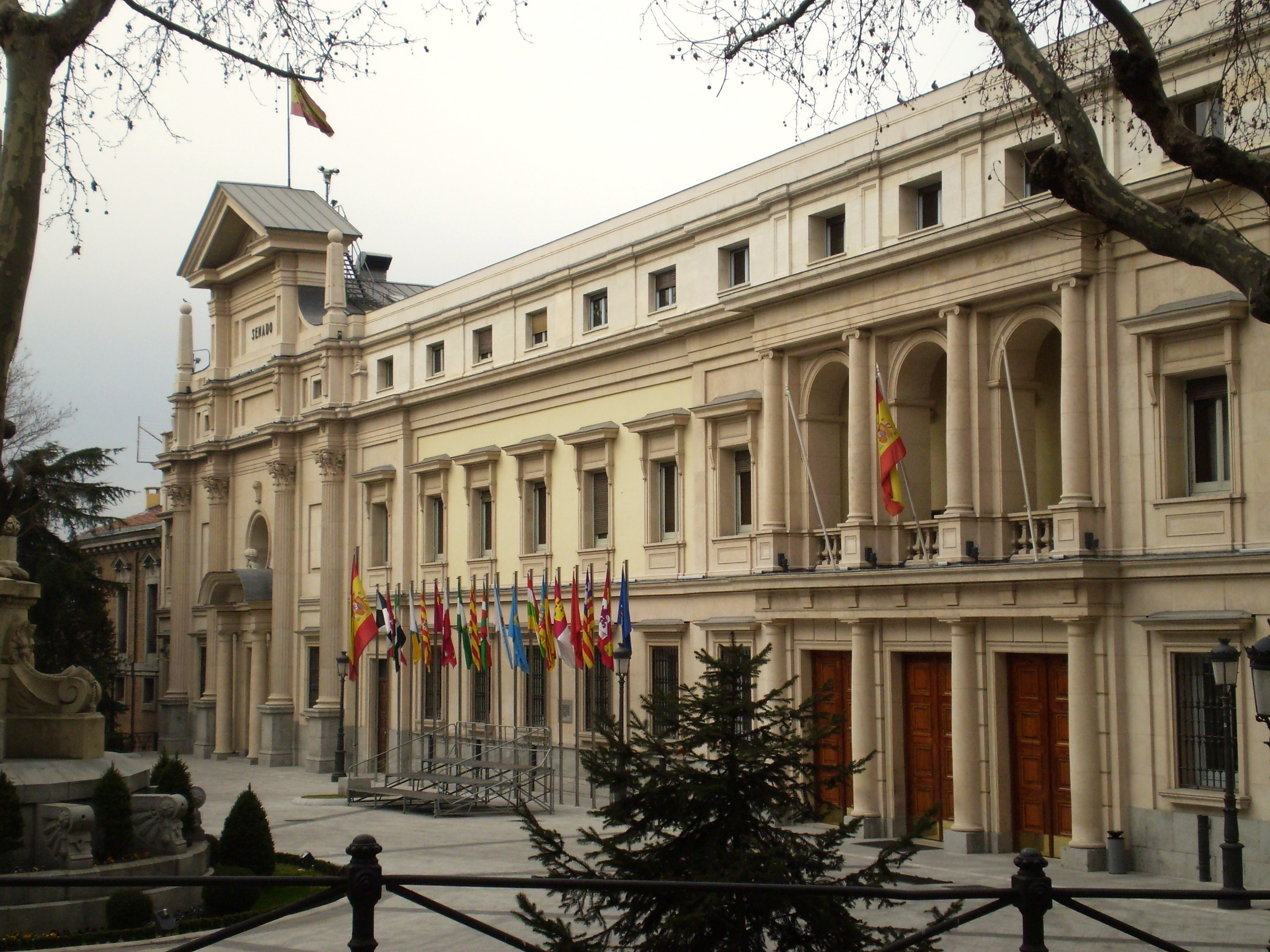
- Facade of the Palace, Madrid, Spain
- Interactive map of the Palace of the Senate area
- Former names: Incarnation School; Doña María de Aragón School

General information
- Architectural style: Herrerian, Neoclassical
- Location: Madrid, Spain
- Coordinates: 40.421183°N 3.711817°W
- Current tenants: Senate of Spain
- Estimated completion: 16th century
- Renovated: 19th and 20th century
- Client: Cortes Generales
- Owner: Kingdom of Spain

Design and construction
- Architects: Francisco de Montalbán (original); Aníbal Álvarez Bouquel and Emilio Rodríguez Ayuso (19th renovation); Salvador Gayarre Ruiz de Galarreta (20th renovation)

The Palace of the Senate is the home of the Senate of Spain, the upper house of the Cortes Generales, the national parliament of Spain. It is located in the Spanish Navy Square, in the center of the City of Madrid.

== History ==
The building was built in the 16th century and was the home of a Saint Augustine Order school called Incarnation School or Doña María de Aragón School. The school was one of the most outstanding institutions of the capital, and its church contained several masterpieces of El Greco, today in the Prado Museum.

In 1814 and between 1820 and 1823 the palace was the home of the Cortes of Cádiz, the first official parliament of Spain.

With the approval of the Royal Statute of 1834, the Cortes Generales was established as a bicameral parliament with the Chamber of Peers as the upper house. The Chambers of Peers moved to the palace in 1835 and with many name and powers changes, this palace continued serving as the home of the upper house of the Cortes until 1923.

During the dictatorship of Primo de Rivera (1923–1930), the Cortes were dissolved and was created the National Consultative Assembly which had its home in the Palacio de las Cortes. With the arrival of the Second Republic, the unicameral parliament established its home at the Palacio de las Cortes and the constitutional debates were held at the Palacio de Cristal del Retiro.

During the dictatorship of Francisco Franco, the palace was the home of the National Council of the Movement, a pseudo Senate controlled by Franco.

With the return of democracy in 1977, the Senate was restored in its original home and, along with the Congress of Deputies, wrote the democratic Constitution of 1978.

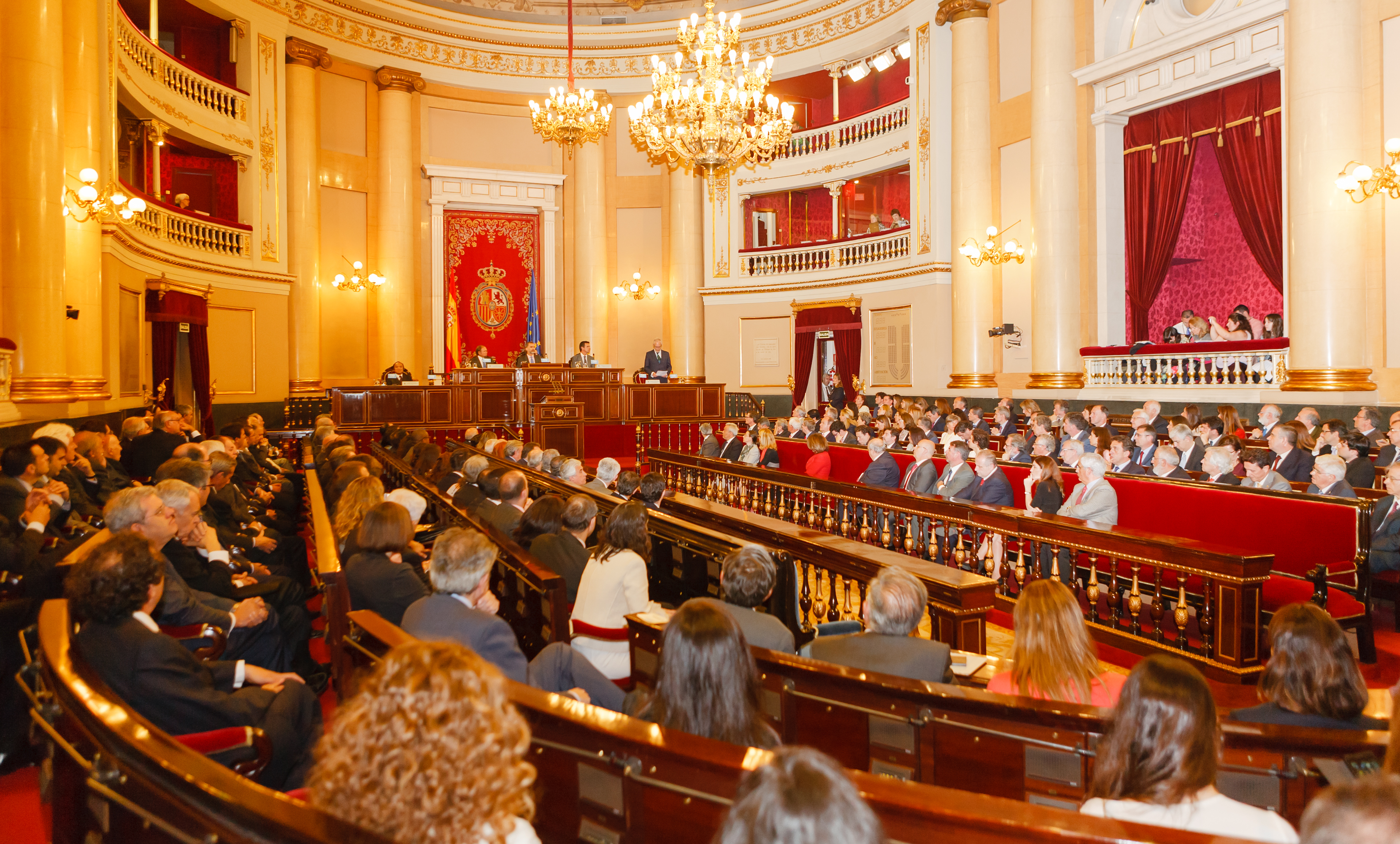
Old Session Room, currently used for ceremonial purposes or for important Committees meetings.
