= Legislature of 1834–35 (Spain) =

The Spanish Royal Statute of 1834 established a bicameral legislature (Cortes) consisting of an upper chamber of unelected nobles and a lower chamber of elected representatives. The first session was opened on 24 July 1834 and closed on 29 May 1835.

== Upper Chamber ==
=== Officers ===
Presidents: Francisco Javier Castaños y Aragorri, Duque de Bailén (resigned); Pedro Agustín Girón, Duque de Ahumada y Marqués de las Amarillas.

Vice-presidents: José Gabriel Silva Bazán, Marqués de Santa Cruz (resigned); Mauricio Álvarez de las Asturias Bohorques y Chacón, Duque de Gor.

Secretaries: Diego Clemencín (died); Ángel Saavedra Ramírez de Baquedano, Duque de Rivas; Isidro Alfonso Sousa de Portugal y Guzmán, Marqués de Guadalcázar; Antonio Cano Manuel y Ramírez de Arellano (absent); Pedro Colón de Toledo y Ramírez de Baquedano, Duque de Veragua; Joaquín Fernández de Córdoba y Vera, Conde de Sástago (interim).

=== Members ===
The following were appointed to the upper chamber:

- Luis del Águila Alvarado, Marqués de Espeja
- Fernando Aguilera y Contreras, Marqués de Cerralbo
- Miguel Ricardo de Álava y Esquivel
- Mauricio Álvarez de las Asturias Bohorques y Chacón, Duque de Gor
- Juan Álvarez Guerra Peña
- José Antonio Aragón Azlor y Pignatelli, Duque de Villahermosa
- Fernando Aranda y Salazar, Conde de Humanes
- Manuel María Aranguren Gaytán de Ayala, Conde de Monterrón
- Juan José Mateo Arias Dávila y Matheu, Conde de Puñonrostro
- Juan Armada Guerra, Marqués de Santa Cruz de Ribadulla
- Andrés Avelino Arteaga y Palafox, Marqués de Valmediano
- Luis Balanzat de Orbay y Briones
- Eusebio Bardají y Azara
- Antonio Bernaldo de Quirós y Rodríguez de los Ríos, Marqués de Monreal y de Santiago
- Juan Bautista Berthier Vaillant y de las Cuevas, Marqués de la Candelaria de Yarayabo
- Manuel de la Bodega Mollinedo
- Juan José Bonel y Orbe, Arzobispo de Toledo
- Francisco Javier de Burgos Olmo
- José de Cafranga
- Antonio Cano Manuel y Ramírez de Arellano
- José Fernando de Carvajal Vargas y de Queralt, Duque de San Carlos
- Francisco Javier Castaños y Aragorri, Duque de Bailén
- José Máximo Cernecio y Palafox, Conde de Parsent
- Mariano Chávez Villarroel, Duque de Noblejas
- Diego Clemencín
- Pedro Colón de Toledo y Ramírez de Baquedano
- Ambrosio de la Cuadra, Duque de Veragua
- Ramón de Despuig Zaforteza, Conde de Montenegro
- Francisco Javier Elio y Jiménez Navarro, Marqués de Vessolla
- José María de Ezpeleta Enrile, Conde de Ezpeleta
- Luis Joaquín Fernández de Córdoba y Benavides, Duque de Medinaceli
- Joaquín Fernández de Córdoba y Pacheco, Marqués de Malpica
- Joaquín Fernández de Córdoba y Vera, Conde de Sástago
- José Rafael Fernández de Híjar Silva y Rebolledo de Palafox, Duque de Híjar
- Bernardino Fernández de Velasco Benavides, Duque de Frías
- Lorenzo Fernández de Villavicencio Cañas y Portocarrero, Duque de San Lorenzo de Vallehermoso
- Francisco Fernández Del Pino, Conde de Pinofiel
- Martín Fernández Navarrete y Jiménez de Tejada
- Pedro José Fonte, Arzobispo de México
- Manuel Fraile, Patriarca de las Indias
- Manuel Freire de Andrade, Marqués de San Marcial
- José García de León y Pizarro
- Manuel García Herreros
- Nicolás María Garelly Battifora
- Francisco Gayoso de los Cobos y Téllez Girón, Marqués de Camarasa
- Ramón Gil de la Cuadra
- Pedro Agustín Girón, Duque de Ahumada y Marqués de las Amarillas
- Tomás José González Carvajal
- Francisco González Castejón, Conde de Castejón
- Pedro González Vallejo, Arzobispo de Toledo y Obispo de Mallorca
- José Manuel de Goyeneche y Barreda, Conde de Guaqui
- Prudencio Guadalfajara y Aguilera, Duque de Castroterreño
- Mariano Guillamás Galiano, Marqués de San Felices
- Diego de Guzmán y de la Cerda, Conde de Oñate
- Narciso Heredia y Begines de los Ríos, Conde de Ofalia y Marqués de Heredia
- Justo María Ibar Navarro
- Mariano Liñán, Obispo de Teruel
- Manuel Llauder y Camín, Marqués del Valle de Rivas
- Ramón López Pelegrín
- Francisco Javier Losada Pardo, Conde de San Román
- Antonio Martínez
- Pedro Martínez de San Martín, Obispo de Barcelona
- Joaquín María Mencos y Eslava, Conde de Guendulain
- Francisco Milán de Aragón, Marqués de Albaida
- Antonio de Mora Oviedo Castillejo, Conde de Santa Ana
- Pablo Morillo, Conde de Cartagena
- Joaquín Navarro Sangrán, Conde de Casa-Sarriá
- Felipe María Osorio y de la Cueva, Conde de Cervellón
- Juan Nepomuceno Ozores de la Espada, Conde de Priegue
- Manuel de Pando Fernández de Pinedo, Marqués de Miraflores
- Jacobo María Parga y Puga
- Luís María Patiño Ramírez de Arellano, Marqués de Castelar
- Evaristo Pérez de Castro
- Fernando Pérez Del Pulgar y Ruiz de Molina, Marqués del Salar
- Nicolás Pérez Osorio y Zayas, Marqués de Alcañices
- Ignacio de la Pezuela y Sánchez
- Cipriano Portocarrero y Palafox, Conde de Teba de Miranda y de Montijo
- Antonio Posada Rubín de Celis, Patriarca de las Indias
- José María Prado de Neyra, Marqués de San Martín de Hombreiro
- José María Puig de Samper
- Vicente Genaro Quesada Arango, Marqués de Moncayo
- Manuel José Quintana
- Lorenzo Ramo de San Blas Laoz, Obispo de Huesca
- Vicente Ramos García, Obispo electo de Almería
- José Antonio Rivadeneyra, Obispo de Valladolid
- Ignacio Rives y Mayor, Arzobispo de Burgos
- Juan Roca de Togores y Carrasco, Conde de Pinohermoso
- José Ramón Rodil, Marqués de Rodil
- Nicolás Roldán y Rioboo, Conde de Taboada
- Juan Ruiz de Apodaca y Eliza, Conde de Venadito
- José Francisco de Paula Ruíz de Molina y Cañaveral, Conde de Clavijo
- Ángel Saavedra Ramírez de Baquedano, Duque de Rivas
- Hipólito Sánchez Rangel, Obispo de Lugo
- José Gabriel Silva Bazán, Marqués de Santa Cruz
- Cayetano de Silva y Fernández de Córdoba, Conde de Salvatierra
- Isidro Alfonso Sousa de Portugal y Guzmán, Marqués de Guadalcázar
- Carlos Miguel Stuart Fitz James y Silva, Duque de Alba de Berwick y de Liria
- José Francisco Tavira, Marqués del Cerro de la Cabeza
- Pedro de Alcántara Téllez de Girón y Beaufort, Duque del Infantado y de Osuna
- Cayetano Valdés Flores
- Gerónimo Valdés Sierra, Conde de Villarín
- Francisco Javier Venegas de Saavedra y Rodríguez de Arenzana, Marqués de la Reunión de Nueva España
- Gaspar de Vigodet
- Francisco Javier Villanueva Barradas, Conde de Atares
- Francisco Dionisio Vives, Conde de Cuba
- Santiago Wall Manrique de Lara, Conde de Armíldez de Toledo
- Manuel José Zavala y Acedo, Conde de Villafuertes
