= Rafael Balanzat y Baranda =

Spanish writer, military man and Knight Laureate

Rafael Balanzat y Baranda (23 December 1820, Madrid – 24 October 1854) was a Spanish writer, military man and Knight Laureate. He was born in Madrid on 23 December 1820 and died in Tarifa, Cadiz on 24 October 1854. Of noble Ibizan family, he was the son of the Inspector General of Infantry and Marshal of the Spanish Army, Ignacio Balanzat de Orvay y Briones and María Dolores de Baranda y Cajigal, and younger brother of Colonel José Balanzat y Baranda. He was the father of the Marchioness of Najera who was a friend and chambermaid of the Infanta Isabel, María Dolores Balanzat y Bretagne.

== Education ==
In 1830 Rafael Balanzat y Baranda joined the Artillery class in the Cadet, where he remained until 1834 when he joined the Army as second lieutenant, being stationed with the "Volunteer of the Crown" of Valencia Regiment.

In 1835 he entered the Academy of Engineering of Guadalajara to which his uncle, Lt. Gen. Luis María Balanzat de Orvay y Briones – devoted his heart and soul to making it one of the best in the world when he was the Engineer General.

Rafael graduated on 11 December 1838 with the rank of Lieutenant and was deployed during the First Carlist War, with the Pontoneros Company, attached to the Northern Army.

== Career ==
His first duties included the fortification of the Arceniega village in Álava.

Two years later he participated in the capture of the Carlist Fort Segura in Aragon between 23 and 27 February 1840, and was granted his first Knight's Cross of the Order of San Fernando, 1st Class, in recognition of his extraordinary actions as mandated by the Royal Decree of 27 April that year.

== Bibliography ==
- José María Bover de Roselló, Varones ilustres Tomo I colección (Illustrious Men collection Volume I) "Biblioteca de Escritores Baleares". Palma de Mallorca, 1868 by Su Magestad Press, Pedro. J. Gelabert. BPE de Palma Funds.
- "Títulos otorgados por Alfonso XII" (Titles given by Alfonso XII), by Barón de los Cobos de Belchite; No. 66 of the Revista Hidalguía, published in 1964.
- "Calendario manual y guía de Forasteros en Madrid" (Manual Calendar and Visitor's Guide in Madrid) pp. 4, 15, 21 and 33; Imprenta Real, 1834. La Universidad Complutense Library.
- Juan Carrillo de Albornoz "La Real y Militar Orden de San Fernando y el Arma de Ingenieros" (The Royal and Military Order of San Fernando and the Army of Engineers). Ministry of Defense Edition. Memorial del Arma de Ingenieros no.63 December 2000.
- María José Rubio "La Chata. La Infanta Isabel de Borbón y la Corona de España". 2003, La Esfera de los Libros.
- Newspaper Archives of La Vanguardia
- Newspaper Archives of ABC
