= Gran i General Consell =

The Gran i General Consell (Catalan: Great and General Council) was the supreme political, administrative, and representative organ of the Kingdom of Majorca. Since the Kingdom of Majorca did not have courts, the Gran i General Consell took over most of the functions they would otherwise have had, including the role of a representative body. The Gran i General Consell evolved from the Catalan municipal councils, especially that of the City of Majorca (present-day Palma). The body that was to become the Gran i General Consell was founded in 1249, and the Consell was abolished on 22 July 1718 by Philip V, empowered by the Nova Planta Decree of Majorca and Ibiza (28 November 1715). At the same time, all other separate Majorcan institutions were dissolved.

Three important characteristics of the Gran i General Consell were:

- Unlike, for example, the French Estates-General, the three estates represented in the Gran i General Consell were given equal representation.
- The principle that the amount of participation granted to representatives in the Gran i General Consell should be in line with their contributions to society.
- The democratic principle of decision-making based on the wishes of the majority.

== Differences between the Consell and the Courts ==
Unlike the Courts of the Crown of Aragon, the Consell could not be summoned by the king but was subject to the jurisdiction of the judges.

== Similarities between the Consell and the Courts ==
Both the Consell and the Courts were collegiate organs, the Consell being composed of members divided into the same categories as the members of the Courts (12 Knights, 12 Citizens, 8 merchants, 12 minstrels, 28 representatives from the towns). The Consell collaborated with the king in matters of legislation and administration, and had the power to oversee over the king in his relations with the Consell itself.

== Functions of the Consell ==
The Consell was a debating chamber, and could convene on the orders of the judges and in the absence of the king and the viceroy. However, in the absence of the viceroy, the judges and the sindics, who were nominated specially for the purpose, the Consell could not act as an executive body.

Decisions were taken by majority vote, and it could act in defence of the realm, or assist the king's officers.

== Powers ==
- The Consell could draft laws, but afterwards (depending on their importance), these would have to be approved either by the king or by the viceroy.
- Proposing laws to the king.
- Amending laws and supervision of its own constitution.
- Approval of the budget and passing of laws to allow for the collection of taxes and the expenditure of funds.
- Defence, including organization of the militia; management of the military; procurement of material; construction of fortifications.
- Health and welfare.
- Official weights and measures.
- Public works
- Commerce
- Culture, education and religion.

== Composition ==
- The Plenary Council was composed of all members of the Consell (72 from 1614 to 1715).
- The Lesser Council or Secret Council was an executive committee of the full Consell with delegated powers; it consisted of 30 councillors, of which at least 3 had to be representatives of the towns.
- City or royal judges. The military judge or the chief judge presided over the Secret Council.

== Election ==
- Beginning in 1447, the members were selected by Sac i sort. This was a form of sortition, in which the names of all eligible candidates were placed in a sack and selected randomly.

=== Location ===
The Council met at the Sala de la Juraria on the Plaça de les Corts (Plaza of the Court) in Palma (the city of Mallorca); as of 2008, the building houses the Ajuntament (city government) of Palma.

=== Functionaries ===
- Notary scribe, later replaced by a position of secretary, who came to serve also as an archivist.
- Two síndics who represented the Majorcans from outside of Palma.
- Correu (messenger)
- Artillers (gunners) of the University, talaiers (watchmen; the term connotes watching from an observation tower), musicians
