= Luis María Balanzat de Orvay y Briones =

Spanish military man, engineer and writer

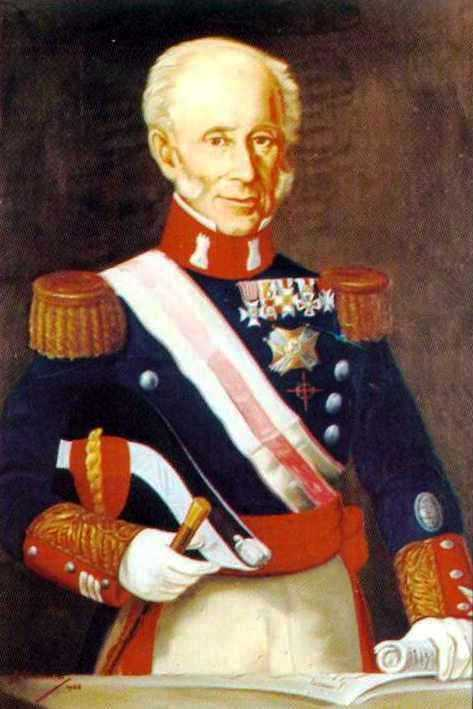
Luis María Balanzat de Orvay y Briones, General Captain of Andalusia, Senator and Minister of War. Painting exhibited in the Army Museum.

Luis María Balanzat de Orvay y Briones (1775–1843) was a Spanish military man, engineer and writer. He was also Minister of War in 1822.

== Biography ==
Born into a noble family from Ibiza, he was the son of Colonel Mariano Balanzat y Orvay and the brother of Marshal Ignacio Balanzat de Orvay y Briones. Rafael Balanzat y Baranda was his nephew. He fought in many battles in the Peninsular War. In 1814, he was Chief of Staff of the Reserve Army of Galicia, where he remained until the end of the war, being promoted to Brigadier General on May 30, 1815.

After the war, he was tasked by General Joaquín Blake with reorganizing the Special Academy of Engineers in Alcalá de Henares, serving as its head of studies and director. He relinquished this position in 1820 upon being appointed member of the Superior Board of the Corps and Undersecretary of War. In 1822, he joined the government of Francisco Martínez de la Rosa as Minister of War. Later, he ran for Parliament representing the Balearic Islands, and was elected as an alternate on December 3, 1822.

A man of Spanish constitutionalist convictions, in 1823, on the occasion of the entry into Spain of the so-called Hundred Thousand Sons of Saint Louis, he opposed the invasion. He was appointed Chief of Staff of the Reserve Army of Andalusia, and as a result, once Ferdinand VII returned to absolutism, he was exiled to the town of Mancha Real, in the province of Jaén. In 1833, he was rehabilitated and promoted to mariscal de campo, while also being appointed "second corporal" (the position immediately below that of captain general) of Andalusia. The following year, he was transferred to Granada as captain general of that military region. Queen Isabella II, within the Royal Statute of 1834, designated him a Peer of the Kingdom for the 1834-1835 legislature. On February 17, 1835, he was appointed Director General of the Corps of Engineers, a position he held until his death in 1843.

In the elections of 1837 and 1840, he was elected senator for the province of Jaén. He was promoted to lieutenant general in 1839.
He died in 1843.
