= Spanish Royal Statute of 1834 =

The Royal Statute of 1834 (Spanish: Estatuto Real), was a royal charter of the Kingdom of Spain under the rule of Maria Christina, wife of the deceased King Ferdinand VII of Spain, who ruled as Queen Regent during the infancy of her daughter Queen Isabella II of Spain. It came into effect on 10 April 1834.

The law created the new legislature, which was designed as a compromise between the existing Assembly, and a new Bicameral model based on the Parliament of the United Kingdom. The new legislature (Spanish: cortes) would consist of an upper chamber (whose members would be unelected and instead appointed by the monarch from the nobility, aristocracy and the rich) and a lower chamber which was designed to be an elected body mirroring the House of Commons of the United Kingdom. Suffrage was limited to a little over 16,000 citizens out of a population of 12 million people.

The Royal Statute was not a constitution because, amongst other reasons, national sovereignty was not derived from it. Instead, absolute sovereignty was invested in the Monarch who could limit or extend their own powers at will, following the model of the Charter of 1814 issued by Louis XVIII during the Bourbon Restoration.

Three legislative sessions of the Cortes were held under the Statute:

- 1834–35
- 1835–36
- 1836
