= House of Peers (Spain) =

Short lived Upper House of the Spanish Cortes

The House of Peers (Spanish: Estamento de Próceres) was the upper house in the Spanish Cortes between 1834 and 1836.

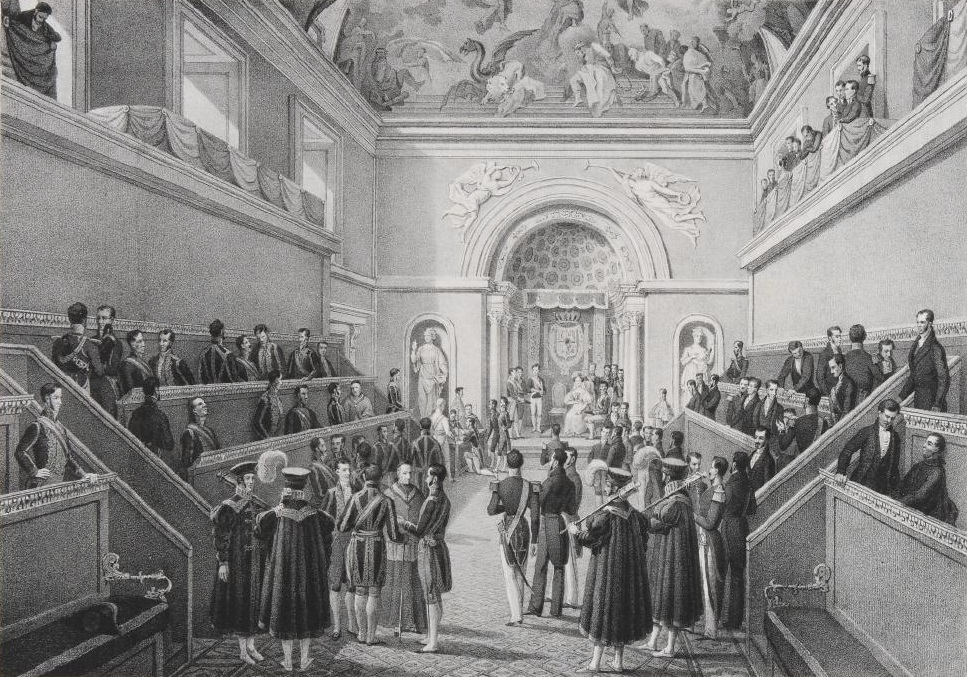
Spanish State opening of Parliament in the Estamento de Próceres, located at that time in the Casón del Buen Retiro, 1834

The House was created by the Royal Statue of 1834 which created a bicameral parliament with two houses: the House of Peers and the House of Representatives (Estamento de Procuradores). After 1837, the houses of the Cortes Generales were named Senate and Congress of Deputies.

Members were Grandees.
